= Minister of Foreign Affairs (Egypt) =

Government position in Egypt

The Egyptian Minister of Foreign Affairs is the head of the Ministry of Foreign Affairs.

== History ==
In the mid-2020s, the title has been changed to Minister of Foreign Affairs, Emigration and Egyptian Expatriates.

== List of ministers ==
| No. | Portrait | Name (Birth–Death) | Term of office | | | Political party | Head of State |
| No. | Portrait | Name (Birth–Death) | Took office | Left office | Time in office | Political party | Head of State |
|---|---|---|---|---|---|---|---|
| 1 | | Boghos Yousefian بوغوص بك يوسفيان (1775–1844) | 1826 | 1844 | 18 years | N/A | Muhammad Ali |
| 2 | | Artin Bey Shoukry ارتين بك شركيان (?-?) | 1844 | 1850 | 6 years | N/A | Muhammad Ali |
| 3 | | Estefan Bey Rasmy استيفان بك دمرجيان (?-?) | 1850 | 1858 | 8 years | N/A | Abbas |
• Khedivate of Egypt (1878–1914) •
| 4 | | Nubar Pasha نوبار باشا (1825–1899) | 1858 | 23 February 1879 | 21 years | Independent | Sa'id |
| 5 | | Ali Zulfikar Pasha علي ذو الفقار باشا (1814–1892) | 10 March 1879 | 7 April 1879 | 28 days | Independent | Isma'il Pasha |
| 6 | | Mohamed Sherif Pasha محمد شريف باشا (1823–1887) | 7 April 1879 | 18 August 1879 | days | Independent | Isma'il Pasha |
| 7 | | Mostafa Fahmy Pasha مصطفى فهمي باشا (1840–1914) | 18 August 1879 | 26 May 1882 | 3 years | Independent | Muhammad Tawfiq Pasha |
| 8 | | Isma'il Raghib Pasha إسماعيل راغب باشا (1819–1884) | 17 June 1882 | 21 August 1882 | days | Independent | Muhammad Tawfiq Pasha |
| (6) | | Muhammad Sharif Pasha محمد شريف باشا (1823–1887) | 21 August 1882 | 10 January 1884 | 1 year, 141 days | Independent | Muhammad Tawfiq Pasha |
| (4) | | Nubar Pasha نوبار باشا (1825–1899) | 10 January 1884 | 9 June 1888 | 4 years, 154 days | Independent | Muhammad Tawfiq Pasha |
| (5) | | Ali Zulfikar Pasha علي ذو الفقار باشا (1814–1892) | 9 June 1888 | 12 May 1891 | 3 years | Independent | Muhammad Tawfiq Pasha |
| 9 | | Tigrane Pasha تكران باشا (?–1904) | 14 May 1891 | 15 April 1894 | 3 years | Independent | Muhammad Tawfiq Pasha |
| 10 | | Boutros Ghali بطرس غالي (1847–1910) | 15 April 1894 | 21 February 1910 (assassinated) | 16 years | Independent | Abbas Helmi II |
| 11 | | Hussein Rushdi Pasha حسين رشدي باشا (1863–1928) | 23 February 1910 | 15 April 1912 | 2 years | Independent | Abbas Helmi II |
| 12 | | Youssef Wahba Pasha يوسف باشا وهبة (1865–1933) | 15 April 1912 | 5 April 1914 | 2 years | Independent | Abbas Helmi II |
| 13 | | Adli Yakan Pasha عدلي يكن باشا (1864–1933) | 5 April 1914 | 19 December 1914 | 8 months | Independent | Abbas Helmi II |
• Sultanate of Egypt (1914–1922) •
| (11) | | Hussein Rushdi Pasha حسين رشدي باشا (1863–1928) | 19 December 1914 | 9 October 1917 | 3 years | Independent | Hussein Kamel |
| | | None | 9 October 1917 | 1 March 1922 | 4 1/2 years | | Hussein Kamel |
• Kingdom of Egypt (1922–1953) •
| 14 | | Abdel Khaliq Sarwat Pasha عبد الخالق ثروت باشا (1873–1928) | 1 March 1922 | 29 November 1922 | 273 days | Liberal Constitutional Party | Fuad I |
| 15 | | Mahmoud Fakhry Pasha محمود فخري باشا (1884–1955) | 30 November 1922 | 9 February 1923 | 2 months, 10 days | | Fuad I |
| 16 | | Ahmed Heshmat Pasha أحمد حشمت باشا (1858–1926) | 15 March 1923 | 6 August 1923 | 4 1/2 months | | Fuad I |
| 17 | | Mohamed Tawfik Refaat Pasha محمد توفيق رفعت باشا (1870–1944) | 6 August 1923 | 27 January 1924 | 4 1/2 months | | Fuad I |
| 18 | | Wasif Boutros Ghali واصف بطرس غالي (1878–1958) | 28 January 1923 | 24 November 1924 | 10 months | | Fuad I |
| 19 | | Ahmed Ziwar Pasha أحمد زيور باشا (1864–1945) | 24 November 1924 | 7 June 1926 | 18 1/2 months | | Fuad I |
| (14) | | Abdel Khaliq Sarwat Pasha عبد الخالق ثروت باشا (1873–1928) | 7 June 1926 | 21 April 1927 | 10 months | | Fuad I |
| 20 | | Murkos Hanna Pasha مرقص حنا باش (1872–1934) | 25 April 1927 | 16 March 1928 | 1 year | | Fuad I |
| (18) | | Wasif Boutros Ghali واصف بطرس غالي (1878–1958) | 16 March 1928 | 25 June 1928 | 3 months | | Fuad I |
| 21 | | Hafez Afifi Pasha حافظ عفيفي بك (1886–1961) | 25 June 1928 | 2 October 1929 | 15 months | | Fuad I |
| 22 | | Ahmed Medhat Yeghen Pasha أحمد مدحت يكن باشا (1878–1944) | 3 October 1929 | 1 January 1930 | 3 months | | Fuad I |
| (18) | | Wasif Boutros Ghali واصف بطرس غالي (1878–1958) | 1 January 1930 | 19 June 1930 | 6 months | | Fuad I |
| (21) | | Hafez Afifi Pasha حافظ عفيفي باشا (1886–1961) | 19 June 1930 | July 1930 | 1 month | | Fuad I |
| 23 | | Abdel Fattah Yahya Ibrahim Pasha عبد الفتاح يحيي إبراهيم باشا (1876–1951) | July 1930 | 4 January 1933 | 2 1/2 years | | Fuad I |

- 1933: Nakhla George al-Motyei Pasha
- 1933: Salib Sami Bey (1st time)
- 1933–1934: Abdel Fattah Yahya Pasha (2nd time)
- 1934–1935 : Kamel Ibrahim Bey
- 1935 - 1936 : Aziz Ezzat Pasha
- 1936 : Ali Maher Pasha (1st time)
- 1936 - 1937 : Wasif Boutros Ghali Pasha (4th time)
- 1937 - 1939 : Abdel Fattah Yahya Pasha (3rd time)
- 1939 - 1940 : Aly Maher Pasha (2nd time)
- 1940 : Hassan Sabry Pasha
- 1940 - 1941 : Hussein Sirri Pasha (1st time)
- 1941 - 1942 : Salib Sami Bey (2nd time)
- 1942 - 1944 : Mustafa an-Nahhas Pasha
- 1944 - 1945 : Mahmoud an-Nukrashi Pasha (1st time)
- 1945 - 1946 : Abdel Hamid Badawi Pasha
- 1946 : Ahmed Lutfi el-Sayed
- 1946 : Ibrahim Abdel Hadi Pasha
- 1946 - 1947 : Mahmoud El Nokrashy Pasha (2nd time)
- 1947 - 1948 : Ahmed Mohamed Khashaba Pasha (1st time)
- 1948 - 1949: Ibrahim Dessouqy Abaza Pasha
- 1949 : Ahmed Mohamed Khashaba Pasha (2nd time)
- 1949 - 1950 : Hussein Sirri Pasha (2nd time)
- 1950 - 1952 : Muhammad Salah al-Din Bey
- 1952 : Ali Maher Pasha (3rd time)
- 1952 : Abdel Khaliq Hassuna (1st time)
- 1952 : Hussein Sirri Pasha (3rd time)
- 1952 : Abdel Khaliq Hassuna (2nd time)
- 1952 : Ali Maher Pasha (4th time)
- 1952 : Ahmed Mohamed Farrag Tayei
- 1952 - 1964 : Mahmoud Fawzi
- 1964 - 1972 : Mahmoud Riad
- 1972 : Mohammed Murad Ghaleb
- 1972 - 1973 : Mohammed Hassan El-Zayyat
- 1973 - 1977 : Ismail Fahmi
- 1977 : Boutros Boutros-Ghali (1st time) (acting)
- 1977 - 1978 : Muhammad Ibrahim Kamel
- 1978 - 1979 : Boutros Boutros-Ghali (2nd time) (acting)
- 1979 - 1980 : Mustafa Khalil
- 1980 - 1984 : Kamal Hassan Ali
- 1984 - 1991 : Esmat Abdel Meguid
- 1991 - 2001 : Amr Moussa
- 2001 - 2004 : Ahmed Maher
- 2004 - 2011: Ahmed Aboul Gheit
- 2011: Nabil Elaraby
- 2011: Mohamed Orabi
- 2011 - 2013: Mohamed Kamel Amr
- 2013 - 2014: Nabil Fahmy
- 2014 - 2024: Sameh Shoukry
- 2024 - present: Badr Abdelatty

== See also ==
- Cabinet of Egypt
