= Ahmed Medhat Yeghen Pasha =

Egyptian politician (1878–1944)

Ahmed Medhat Yeghen Pasha احمد مدحت يكن باشا
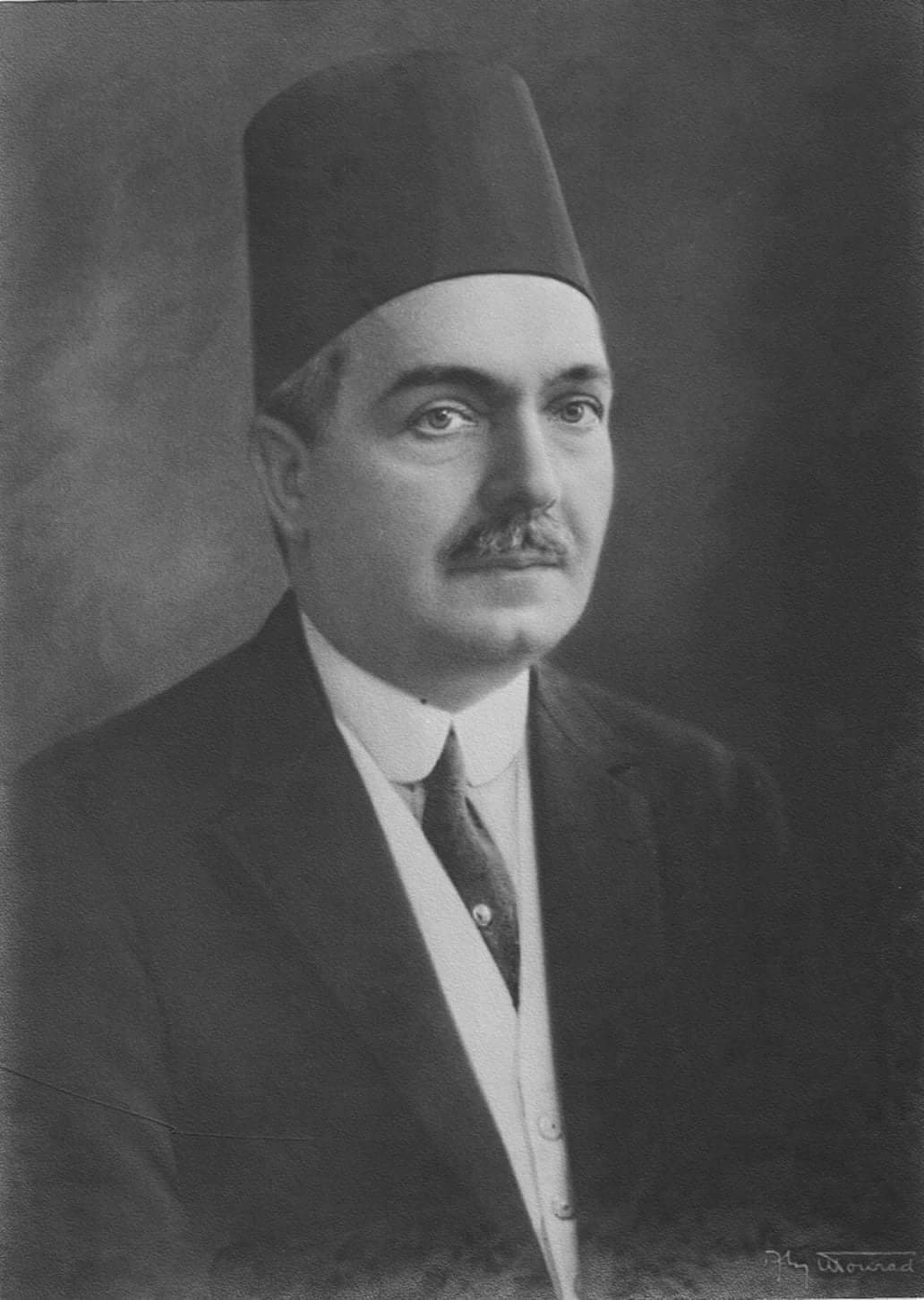

Minister of Agriculture
- In office 9 April 1919 – 22 April 1919
- Preceded by: Mohamed Shafik Pasha
- Succeeded by: Abdel Rahim Sabri Pasha

Minister of Endowments
- In office 16 March 1921 – 24 December 1924

Minister of Foreign Affairs
- In office 3 October 1929 – 1 January 1930
- Preceded by: Hafez Afifi Pasha
- Succeeded by: Wasif Boutros Ghali

Personal details
- Born: 1878
- Died: 1944 (aged 65–66)
- Spouse: Wahida Yehya Mansour Yeghen (d.1911)
- Parent(s): Aly Haidar Yeghen (Father); Malak Sayema Hanem (Mother)

Ahmed Medhat Yeghen Pasha (Arabic: احمد مدحت يكن باشا; 1878–1944) was an Egyptian politician who served as governor of Alexandria and minister of Agriculture. He was the co-founder of Banque Misr and its first chairman. He was a member of the Muhammed Ali Dynasty.

== Early life and education ==
Ahmed Medhat Yeghen Pasha was born in 1878, and belongs to the Yeghen family, whose founder married the sister of Muhammad Ali Pasha. He studied at the school founded by Khedive Tawfiq for his children, then he traveled to Geneva with Khedive Abbas, Prince Muhammad Ali, and Prince Kamal. When he returned to Egypt, he obtained a high school diploma, then he traveled to France and obtained a bachelor's degree in law. After his return, he was appointed assistant prosecutor in the mixed courts. Boutros Ghali chose him as his private secretary at the Ministry of Foreign Affairs. He was then married to Wahida Mansur Yeghen, granddaughter of Isma’il through her mother Princess Tewhida Hanim, the eldest daughter of the Khedive.

== Career ==
He became governor of Alexandria from 1917 until 1919. He was appointed Minister of Agriculture in Hussein Roshdiy's fourth ministry (April 22, 1919). He was one of the major land-owners, which qualified him to be one of the founders of the Banque Misr in 1920. He then became its first chairman from 1920 till 1940. He held the position of Minister of Endowments in the First Ministry of Adly Yeghen (March 16, 1921 - December 24, 1921). He was the first chairman of the Board of Directors of the Egyptian Land Bank, and a member of the Egyptian Economic Council, in 1922. He was a member of the Liberal Constitutional Party, which was founded in 1922. He was appointed Minister of Foreign Affairs during the third Ministry of Adly Yeghen (October 3, 1929, January 1, 1930), and later became a member of the Senate.

== Death ==
He died in 1944.

== See also ==
- Saad Zaghloul
- Hussein Sabri Pasha
