= Ali Zulfikar Pasha =

Egyptian politician

- علي ذو الفقار باشا

5th Foreign Minister of Egypt
- In office 10 March 1879 – 7 April 1879
- Monarch: Isma'il Pasha
- Preceded by: Nubar Pasha
- Succeeded by: Mohamed Sherif Pasha
- In office 9 June 1888 – 12 May 1891
- Monarch: Mohamed Tewfik Pasha
- Preceded by: Nubar Pasha
- Succeeded by: Tigrane Pasha

Personal details
- Born: 1814 Mesolongi-Greece
- Died: 1892 Cairo-Giza

Ali Zulfikar Pasha (Arabic: علي ذو الفقار باشا (d. 27 July 1904, Evian-les-Bains) was twice Foreign Minister of Egypt. He was a major landholder in Egypt.

== Career ==
Ali was a slave brought from Greece. He was born in Mesolongi in the Greek prefecture of Etoloakarnania in 1814. His Greek name was Panos (Panagiotis) Galanos. He was captured as a slave on April 11, 1826, during the Siege of Mesolongi. He given by Muhammad Ali Pasha to his son (and future Wali of Egypt) Sa'id of Egypt as a study companion. He served in the Egyptian navy from 1834, and was appointed president of the Majlis al-Ahkam in 1857. He was made governor of Alexandria in 1866. Ali was director of the Justice Ministry in the government of Muhammad Sharif Pasha. After serving as foreign minister from 1888 to 1891, his last post was chief of protocol. Years later, Ali Zulfikar Pasha reunited with his family, his mother and his brothers Asimakis and Spyros, whom he dismissed in public service and all lived together in Egypt. Ali Zulfikar Pasha, despite being forced to convert to Islam from an early age, remained a crypto-Christian all his life. His son was Said Zulfiqar Pasha.
