= Tigrane Pasha =

Egyptian politician (died 1904)

- تكران باشا
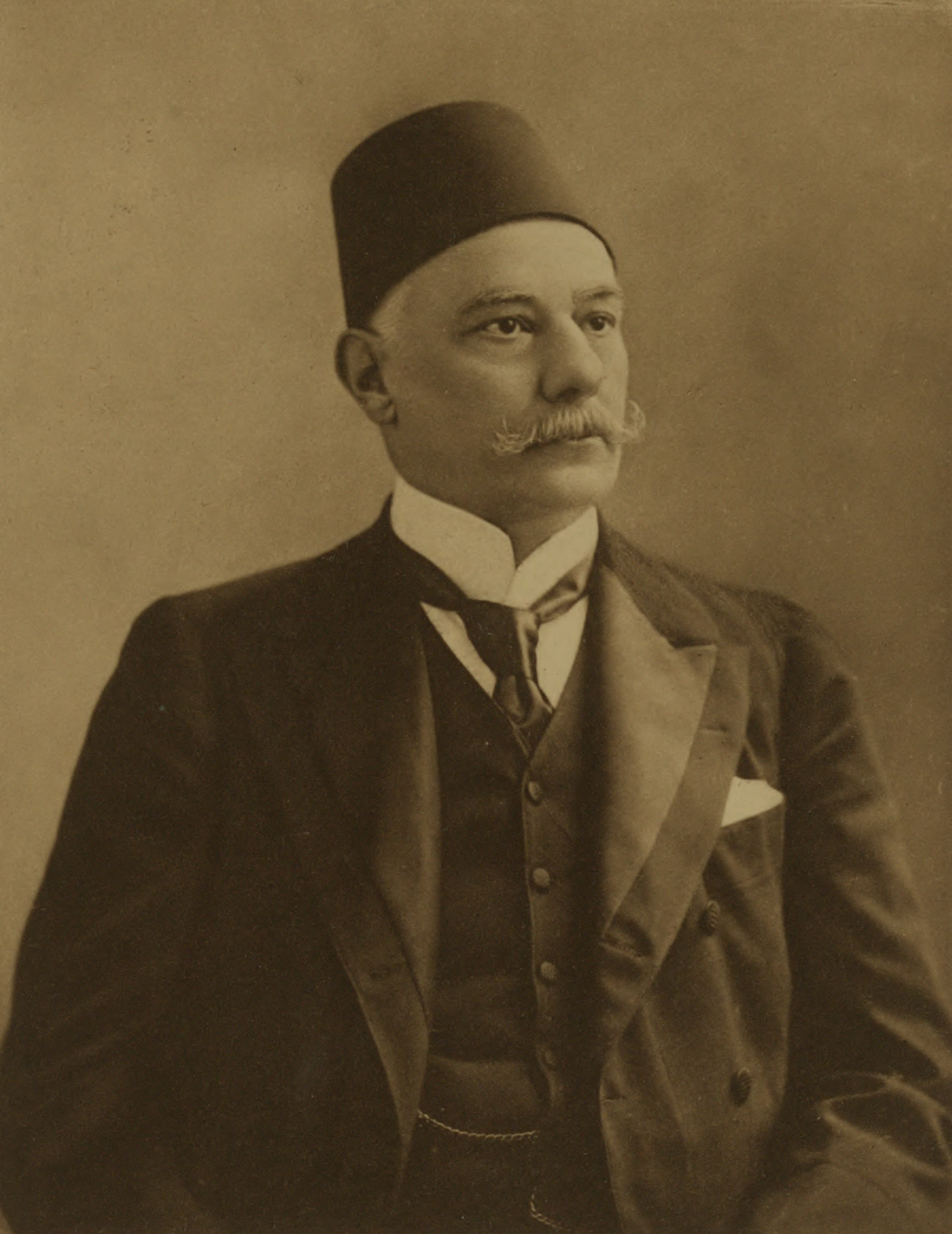

9th Foreign Minister of Egypt
- In office 14 May 1891 – 15 April 1894
- Monarch: Mohamed Tewfik Pasha
- Preceded by: Zulfikar Pasha
- Succeeded by: Mostafa Fahmy Pasha

Personal details
- Died: 27 July 1904 (aged 57) Evian-les-Bains, France

Tigrane Pasha (Arabic: تكران باشا (Dikran) (d. 27 July 1904, Evian-les-Bains) was an Egyptian-Armenian politician and the ninth Foreign Minister of Egypt. He served as Foreign Minister from 1891 to 1894, under three Prime Ministers.

== Career ==
Tigrane was a nephew of the powerful statesman Nubar Pasha. He received a European education, and was less than fluent in Arabic and Turkish. In 1865, his uncle appointed him to the railway administration. In 1878, he was secretary general of the Council of Ministers during his uncle's first term as prime minister.
