= Fifth Gamal Abdel Nasser government =

Government of the United Arab Republic from 1958 to 1961

- 59th Syrian government 2nd United Arab Republic government Council of Ministers of United Arab Republic

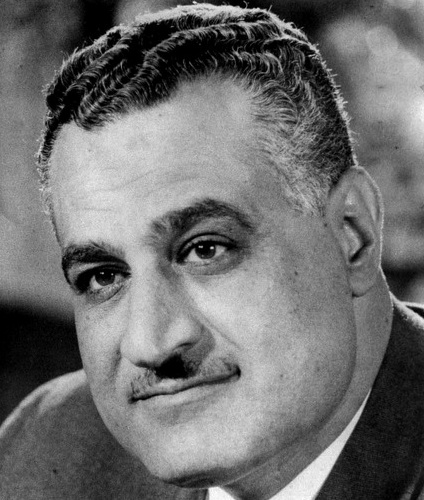
- Date formed: 7 October 1958
- Date dissolved: 16 August 1961

People and organisations
- President: Gamal Abdel Nasser
- President of the Council of Ministers: Gamal Abdel Nasser

History
- Predecessor: Fourth Gamal Abdel Nasser government
- Successor: Sixth Gamal Abdel Nasser government

The fifth government of Gamal Abdel Nasser was the second government of the United Arab Republic and is considered the 59th government in the modern history of Syria. It was formed on 7 October 1958 as a central government based in Cairo, with two branches exercising broad powers in the Northern Region and Southern Region. The government ended following the resignation of the Ba'athist ministers after disagreements with Field Marshal Abdel Hakim Amer, whom Nasser had appointed as his deputy with broad powers. A central government was subsequently formed, and the extensive powers of the two executive councils were abolished.

== Appointments, secondments and resignations ==
- Decree No. 1303, issued on 8 October 1958, designated the presidents of the two executive councils in the Egyptian and Syrian regions as ministers of state in the central government.
- The central government was formed by Decree No. 1299.
- The Executive Council of the Egyptian Region was formed by Decree No. 1301.
- The Executive Council of the Syrian Region was formed by Decree No. 1302.
- On 25 October 1958, Decree No. 1367 was issued appointing Hassan Abbas Zaki, Minister of Economy in the Egyptian Executive Council, to assume the duties of Minister of Supply in that region.
- On 8 November 1958, Decree No. 1432 was issued appointing Ta'ma al-Awda Allah, Minister of Municipal and Rural Affairs in the Syrian Region, to assume the duties of Minister of Supply in that region.
- On 10 February 1959, Decree No. 285 accepted the resignation of Sheikh Ahmed Hassan al-Baqouri as Minister of Awqaf and appointed Kamal al-Din Mahmoud Rifaat, Minister of State, to assume the duties of Minister of Awqaf.
- On 2 April 1959, Decree No. 573 accepted the resignation of Fathy Rizk Ahmed as Minister of Industry from all positions he held.
- On 5 April 1959, Decree No. 575 appointed Abdel Hamid al-Sarraj, Minister of Interior in the Syrian Region, as Minister of Awqaf in that region.
- On 6 May 1959, Decree No. 733 appointed Dr. Abdel Moneim el-Qaysouni, Central Minister of Economy, to assume the duties of Minister of the Treasury.
- On 9 May 1959, Decree No. 723 appointed Lieutenant General Mohamed Ibrahim, Chief of Staff of the Armed Forces, as Minister of State for War Affairs.
- On 24 October 1959, Decree No. 1977 appointed Ahmed Abdullah Ta'ima as Minister of Awqaf in the Southern Region.
- On 30 December 1959, Decree No. 2351 accepted the resignations of:
  - Akram al-Hawrani, Vice President of the Republic and Central Minister of Justice
  - Salah al-Din al-Bitar, Central Minister of Culture and National Guidance
  - Mustafa Hamdoun, Minister of Agrarian Reform in the Syrian Region
  - Abd al-Ghani Qannout, Minister of Social Affairs and Labour
- On 30 December 1959, Decree No. 2352 seconded:
  - Abdel Hamid al-Sarraj, Minister of Interior in the Syrian Region, to assume the duties of Minister of Social Affairs and Labour in that region
  - Ta'ma al-Awda Allah, Minister of Municipal and Rural Affairs in the Syrian Region, to assume the duties of Minister of Agrarian Reform in that region
- On 3 December 1960, Decree No. 1 accepted the resignation of Khalil al-Kallas, Minister of Economy in the Syrian Region.
- On 17 March 1960, Decree No. 405 appointed the following officials in the Syrian Region:
  - Ahmed Geneidy, Minister of Agrarian Reform
  - Hosni al-Sawwaf, Minister of Economy
  - Akram Diri, Minister of Social Affairs and Labour
  - Jadu Ezz al-Din, Minister of State for Presidential Affairs
  - Gamal al-Soufi, Minister of Supply
  - Thabit al-Aris, Minister of Culture and National Guidance
  - Yusuf Muzahim, Minister of Awqaf
- On 2 May 1960, Decree No. 687 accepted the resignation of Amin al-Nafouri, Minister of Transport.
- On 2 May 1960, Decree No. 688 accepted the resignation of Ahmed Abdel Karim, Minister of Municipal and Rural Affairs.
- On 18 July 1960, Decree No. 1238 appointed engineer Nour al-Din Kahala as Vice President of the Republic.
- On 10 September 1960, Decree No. 1514 appointed Kamal al-Din Hussein as Minister of Local Administration.
- On 20 September 1960, Decree No. 1521 appointed:
  - Nour al-Din Kahala, Minister of Central Planning
  - Kamal al-Din Hussein, President of the Executive Council
  - Nour al-Din Tarraf, Minister of Central Health
  - Abdel Hamid al-Sarraj, President of the Executive Council and Minister of State in the Northern Region
  - Fakhr al-Kayali, Central Minister of Justice
  - Ta'ma al-Awda Allah, Central Minister of Municipal and Rural Affairs
  - Muhammad al-Alam, Central Minister of Transport
  - Jadu Ezz al-Din, Minister of Public Works in the Northern Region
  - Thabit al-Aris, Central Minister of Culture and National Guidance
- On 12 February 1961, Decree No. 37 appointed Akram Diri, Minister of Social Affairs and Labour in the Northern Region, to assume the duties of Minister of Economy in that region.

== Vice presidents of the Republic ==
Position	Officeholder	Affiliation
Gamal Abdel Nasser	President of the United Arab Republic, head of government	Egyptian
Akram al-Hawrani	Vice President for Social Affairs and Public Policy	Syrian
Abdel Latif al-Baghdadi	Vice President for Economic Affairs	Egyptian
Abdel Hakim Amer	Vice President for Defence and the Armed Forces	Egyptian
Nour al-Din Kahala		From 18 July 1960

== Central government ==
Position	Portrait	Name	Party	In office
President of the Council of Ministers		Gamal Abdel Nasser	Arab Socialist Union	6 March 1958 – 18 October 1961
Minister of War		Abdel Hakim Amer		6 March 1958 – 18 October 1961
Minister of Planning		Abdel Latif al-Baghdadi		7 October 1958 – 20 September 1960
Minister of Planning		Nour al-Din Kahala		20 September 1960 – 16 August 1961
Minister of Justice		Akram al-Hawrani		7 October 1958 – 30 December 1959
Minister of Justice		Fakhr al-Kayali		20 September 1960 – 16 August 1961
Minister of Interior		Zakaria Mohieddin		6 March 1958 – 16 August 1961
Minister of Social Affairs and Labour		Hussein Mahmoud al-Shafei		7 October 1958 – 16 August 1961
Minister of Education		Kamal al-Din Hussein		6 March 1958 – 16 August 1961
Minister of the Treasury		Hassan Gabara		7 October 1958 – 6 May 1959
Minister of the Treasury		Abdel Moneim el-Qaysouni		6 May 1959 – 16 August 1961
Minister of Awqaf		Ahmed Hassan al-Baqouri		6 March 1958 – 10 February 1959
Minister of Awqaf		Kamal al-Din Mahmoud Rifaat		10 February 1959 – 24 October 1959
Minister of Awqaf		Ahmed Abdullah Ta'ima		24 October 1959 – 18 October 1961
Minister of Foreign Affairs		Mahmoud Fawzi		6 March 1958 – 18 October 1961
Minister of Culture and National Guidance		Salah al-Din al-Bitar		7 October 1958 – 30 December 1959
Minister of Culture and National Guidance		Thabit al-Aris		20 September 1960 – 16 August 1961
Minister of Public Works		Ahmed Abdo al-Sharbasi		7 October 1958 – 18 October 1961
Minister of Economy		Abdel Moneim el-Qaysouni		7 October 1958 – 16 August 1961
Minister of Supply		Kamal Estino		6 March 1958 – 18 October 1961
Minister of Industry		Aziz Sedki		7 October 1958 – 18 October 1961
Minister of Agriculture and Agrarian Reform		Sayed Marei		7 October 1958 – 18 October 1961
Minister of Presidential Affairs		Ali Sabri		6 March 1958 – 18 October 1961
Minister of Municipal and Rural Affairs		Ahmed Abdel Karim		7 October 1958 – 2 May 1960
Minister of Municipal and Rural Affairs		Ta'ma al-Awda Allah		20 September 1960 – 16 August 1961
Minister of Transport		Amin al-Nafouri		7 October 1958 – 2 May 1960
Minister of Transport		Muhammad al-Alam		20 September 1960 – 16 August 1961
Minister of Public Health		Bashir al-Azma		7 October 1958 – 20 September 1960
Minister of Public Health		Nour al-Din Tarraf		20 September 1960 – 18 October 1961
Minister of State		Nour al-Din Kahala		7 October 1958 – 20 September 1960
Minister of State		Abdel Hamid al-Sarraj		20 September 1960 – 16 August 1961
Minister of State		Nour al-Din Tarraf		7 October 1958 – 20 September 1960
Minister of State		Kamal al-Din Hussein		20 September 1960 – 16 August 1961
Minister of State		Fakhr al-Kayali		7 October 1958 – 20 September 1961
Minister of State		Kamal al-Din Rifaat		7 October 1958 – 18 October 1961
Minister of State for War Affairs		Muhammad Ibrahim Selim		9 May 1959 – 16 August 1961
Minister of State for Broadcasting and the Information Service		Abdel Qader Hatem		9 January 1959 – 16 August 1961

== Executive Council of the Syrian Region ==
Position	Portrait	Name	Party	In office
President of the Executive Council in the Northern Region		Nour al-Din Kahala		7 October 1958 – 20 September 1960
President of the Executive Council in the Northern Region		Abdel Hamid al-Sarraj		20 September 1960 – 16 August 1961
Minister of Planning		Nour al-Din Kahala		7 October 1958 – 16 August 1961
Minister of Public Works		Nour al-Din Kahala		7 October 1958 – 20 September 1960
Minister of Public Works		Jadu Ezz al-Din		20 September 1960 – 16 August 1961
Minister of Interior		Abdel Hamid al-Sarraj		6 March 1958 – 16 August 1961
Minister of the Treasury		Abd al-Wahhab Hawamdeh		7 October 1958 – 16 August 1961
Minister of Economy		Khalil al-Kallas		7 October 1958 – 3 January 1960
Minister of Economy		Hosni al-Sawwaf		17 March 1960 – 12 February 1961
Minister of Economy		Akram Diri		12 February 1961 – 16 August 1961
Minister of Agrarian Reform		Mustafa Hamdoun		7 October 1958 – 30 December 1959
Minister of Agrarian Reform		Ta'ma al-Awda Allah		30 December 1959 – 17 March 1960
Minister of Agrarian Reform		Ahmed Geneidy		17 March 1960 – 16 August 1961
Minister of Agriculture		Ahmed al-Hajj Yunis		6 March 1958 – 16 August 1961
Minister of Health		Shawkat al-Qanawati		6 March 1958 – 16 August 1961
Minister of Justice		Nihad al-Qasim		7 October 1958 – 16 August 1961
Minister of Municipal and Rural Affairs		Ta'ma al-Awda Allah		7 October 1958 – 16 August 1961
Minister of Social Affairs and Labour		Abd al-Ghani Qannout		7 October 1958 – 30 December 1959
Minister of Social Affairs and Labour		Abdel Hamid al-Sarraj		30 December 1959 – 17 March 1960
Minister of Social Affairs and Labour		Akram Diri		17 March 1960 – 16 August 1961
Minister of Industry		Wajih al-Samman		7 October 1958 – 16 August 1961
Minister of Education		Amjad al-Tarabulsi		7 October 1958 – 16 August 1961
Minister of Culture and National Guidance		Riad al-Maliki		7 October 1958 – 17 March 1960
Minister of Culture and National Guidance		Thabit al-Aris		17 March 1960 – 16 August 1961
Minister of Supply		Ta'ma al-Awda Allah		8 November 1958 – 17 March 1960
Minister of Supply		Gamal al-Soufi		17 March 1960 – 16 August 1961
Minister of Transport		Muhammad al-Alam	Add a reference for the beginning date, page 145 of History of Contemporary Syria	7 October 1958 – 16 August 1961
Minister of Awqaf		Abdel Hamid al-Sarraj		5 April 1959 – 17 March 1960
Minister of Awqaf		Yusuf Muzahim		17 March 1960 – 16 August 1961
Minister of State for Presidential Affairs		Jadu Ezz al-Din		17 March 1960 – 16 August 1961

== Executive Council of the Egyptian Region ==
Position	Portrait	Name	Party	In office
President of the Executive Council in the Southern Region		Nour al-Din Tarraf		7 October 1958 – 20 September 1960
President of the Executive Council in the Southern Region		Kamal al-Din Hussein		20 September 1960 – 16 August 1961
Minister of Justice		Ahmed Hosni		6 March 1958 – 16 August 1961
Minister of Municipal and Rural Affairs		Muhammad Abu Nusayr		6 March 1958 – 16 August 1961
Minister of Transport		Mustafa Khalil Kamel Mustafa		6 March 1958 – 16 August 1961
Minister of Economy		Hassan Abbas Zaki		7 October 1958 – 16 August 1961
Minister of Industry		Fathy Rizk Ahmed		7 October 1958 – 2 April 1959
Minister of Industry		Aziz Sedki		2 April 1959 – 16 August 1961
Minister of Culture and National Guidance		Tharwat Okasha		7 October 1958 – 16 August 1961
Minister of Interior		Abbas Radwan		7 October 1958 – 16 August 1961
Minister of Public Health		Muhammad Mahmoud Nassar		7 October 1958 – 16 August 1961
Minister of Public Works		Musa Arafa		7 October 1958 – 16 August 1961
Minister of Education		Ahmed Naguib Hashem		7 October 1958 – 16 August 1961
Minister of Agriculture		Ahmed Muhammad al-Mahrouqi		7 October 1958 – 16 August 1961
Minister of Agrarian Reform		Hassan Ahmed al-Baghdadi		7 October 1958 – 16 August 1961
Minister of the Treasury		Hassan Salah al-Din		7 October 1958 – 16 August 1961
Minister of Social Affairs and Labour		Muhammad Tawfiq Abd al-Fattah		7 October 1958 – 16 August 1961
Minister of Supply		Hassan Abbas Zaki		25 October 1958 – 16 August 1961
Minister of Awqaf		Ahmed Abdullah Ta'ima		24 October 1959 – 16 August 1961
Minister of Local Administration		Kamal al-Din Hussein		10 September 1960 – 16 August 1961
