= Sameh Shoukry =

Egyptian diplomat (born 1952)

- سامح شكري
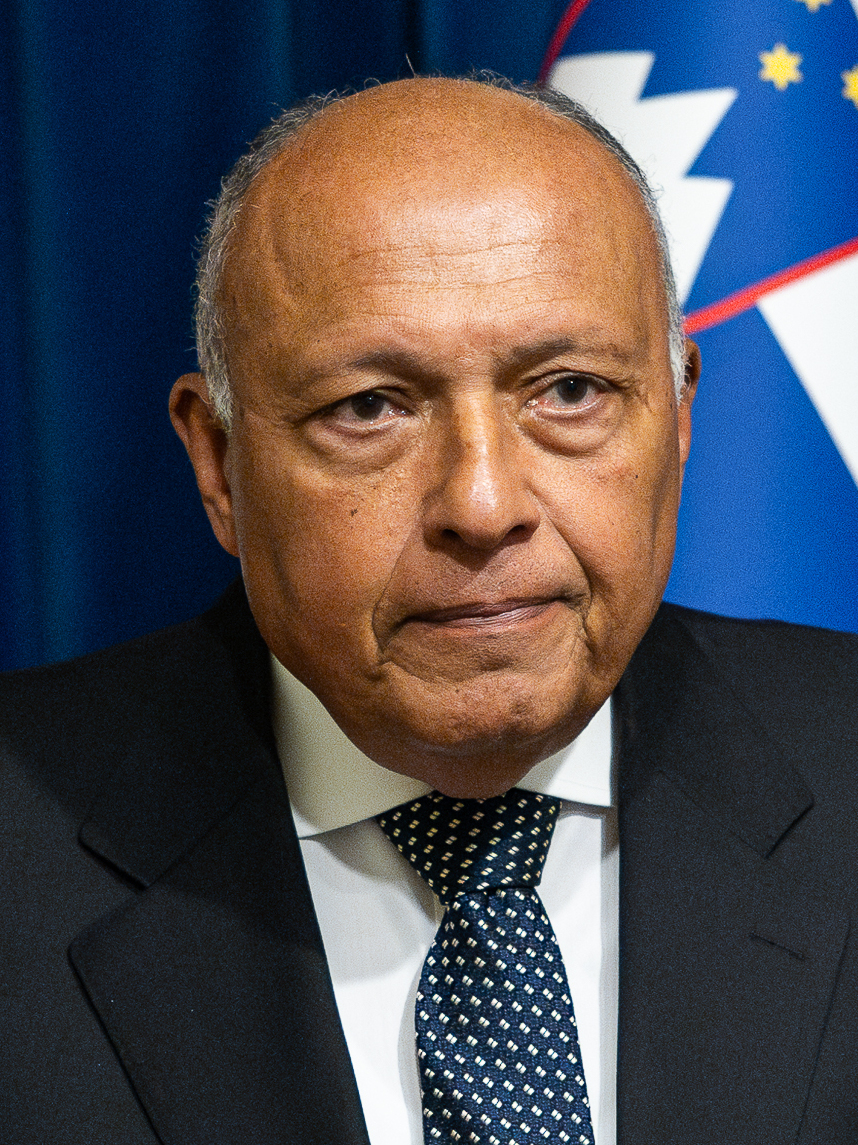
- Shoukry in 2024

Minister of Foreign Affairs
- In office 17 June 2014 – 3 July 2024
- Prime Minister: Ibrahim Mahlab; Sherif Ismail; Mostafa Madbouly
- Preceded by: Nabil Fahmi
- Succeeded by: Badr Abdelatty

Personal details
- Born: 20 October 1952 (age 73) Cairo, Egypt
- Party: Independent
- Spouse: Suzy Shoukry
- Children: 2
- Education: Ain Shams University

Sameh Hassan Shoukry (Arabic: سامح شكري; born 20 October 1952) is an Egyptian diplomat who served as the Minister of Foreign Affairs from 2014 to 2024. Previously, Shoukry served as the Ambassador of Egypt to the United States from 2008 to 2012.

== Career ==
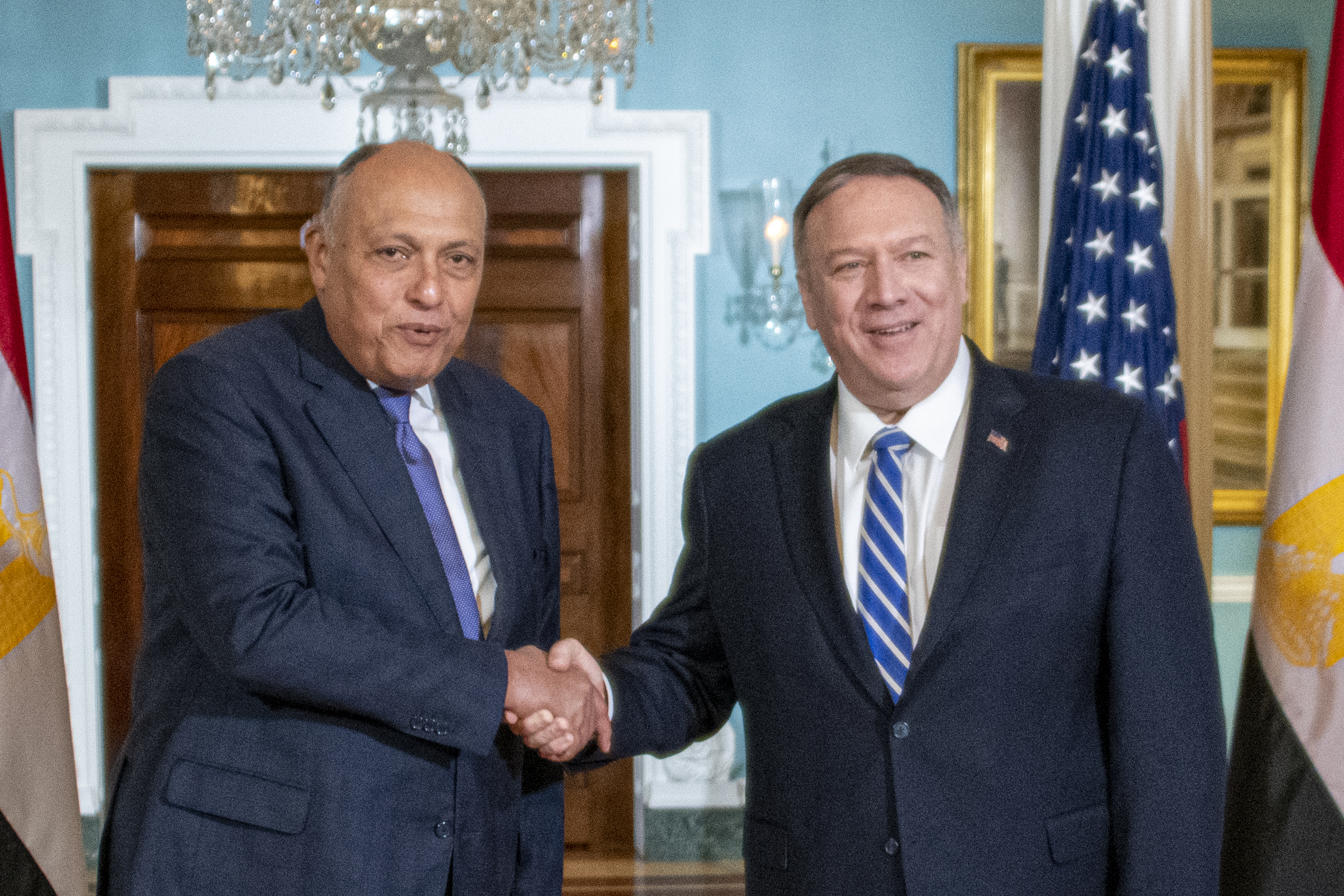
Shoukry (left) meets with U.S. Secretary of State Mike Pompeo in 2019

From 1976 until 1978, Sameh Shoukry worked as Attaché in the Egyptian Ministry of Foreign Affairs in Cairo.

Between 1978 and 1982, he was the Third Secretary at the Embassy of Egypt in London, United Kingdom.

In 1982, Shoukry became the Second Secretary of the Cabinet of the Deputy Prime Minister and Minister of Foreign Affairs.

From 1984 until 1988, he served as First Secretary of the Embassy of Egypt in Buenos Aires, Argentina.

Between 1988 and 1990, he was counselor of the Cabinet of the Deputy Prime Minister and Minister of Foreign Affairs.

From 1990 until 1994, Shoukry worked as counselor of the Permanent Mission of Egypt to the United Nations in New York.

In 1994, he was director of the United States and Canada Department of the Ministry of Foreign Affairs in Cairo.

Shoukry was a member of the Delegation of Egypt to the 1995 Treaty on the Non-Proliferation of Nuclear Weapons (NPT) Review Conference.

Between 1995 and 1999, he served as Secretary for Information and follow-up to the President of Egypt, Hosni Mubarak.

In 2000, he was Head of Delegation for the Negotiations on the International Treaty to Combat Transnational Organized Crime in Vienna.

From 2001 until 2002, he worked as chairman of the Group of 77 & China to the International Organizations in Vienna.

Between 1999 and 2003, Shoukry served as Ambassador Extraordinary and Plenipotentiary of Egypt to Austria.

In 2003, he became Assistant Foreign Minister and Chief of Protocol of the Ministry of Foreign Affairs of Egypt.

In 2004, he became Chief of Cabinet of the Minister of Foreign Affairs of Egypt.

Between 2005 and 2008, Shoukry was Ambassador and Permanent Representative of Egypt to the United Nations and other International Organizations in Geneva.

From 2008 until 2012, he served as Ambassador of Egypt to the United States.

Shoukry was the Sherpa to the 2012 Seoul Nuclear Security Summit and the 2014 Hague Nuclear Security Summit.

From 17 June 2014 to 3 July 2024, he served as Minister of Foreign Affairs of Egypt.

In November 2022, he presided over the United Nations Climate Change Conference.

He was appointed to the Egyptian House of Representatives in January 2026.

== Personal life ==
He is married to Suzy Shoukry, and has two sons. He obtained a law degree from Ain Shams University in 1975. A career diplomat, he had ostensibly retired prior to being appointed Minister of Foreign Affairs in 2014. He speaks Arabic, English and Spanish.

Political offices
Preceded by Nabil Fahmi	Minister of Foreign Affairs; 2014–present	Incumbent
