= Mohammed Hassan El-Zayyat =

Egyptian diplomat

Mohammed Hassan El-Zayyat (14 February 1915 – 25 February 1993) was an Egyptian diplomat and Minister of Foreign Affairs.

El-Zayyat served as the Permanent Representative of Egypt in the United Nations from 1960 to 1964 and again from 1969 to 1972. In 1964-1965 he served as Egyptian Ambassador to India, and from 1965 to 1969 he served as spokesman of the Egyptian Ministry of Foreign Affairs. In 1972 he briefly served as Minister of Information. He served as the Minister of Foreign Affairs from 8 September 1972 to 31 October 1973.

Political offices
Preceded by Tharwat Okasha	Minister of Information of Egypt; 1972-1974	Succeeded by Aḥmad Kamāl Abū al-Majd
Preceded by Mohammed Murad Ghaleb	Foreign Minister of Egypt; 1972-1973	Succeeded by Ismail Fahmi
