= Sixth Gamal Abdel Nasser government =

Government of the United Arab Republic, 1961

- 60th Syrian government 3rd United Arab Republic government Council of Ministers of United Arab Republic

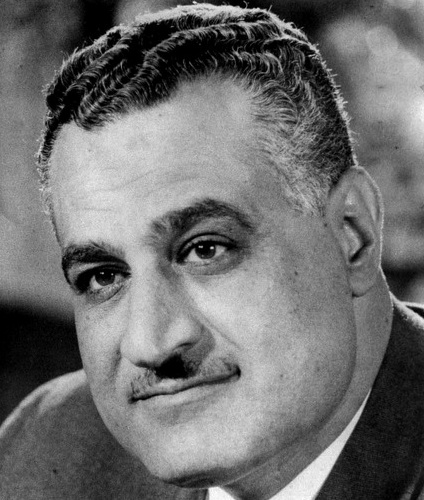
- Date formed: 16 August 1961
- Date dissolved: 18 October 1961

People and organisations
- President: Gamal Abdel Nasser
- President of the Council of Ministers: Gamal Abdel Nasser

History
- Predecessor: Fifth Gamal Abdel Nasser government
- Successor: Maamun al-Kuzbari government

The Sixth Government of Gamal Abdel Nasser was the third and final government of the United Arab Republic. Kamal el-Din Hussein was assigned to head the Executive Council of the Egyptian Region, while Abdel Hamid al-Sarraj was assigned to head the Executive Council of the Syrian Region. Both councils were subordinate to the central government headed by Gamal Abdel Nasser.

- On 10 October 1961, Decrees Nos. 1530 and 1531 were issued assigning Zakaria Mohieddin, Vice President for Productive Institutions, to perform the duties of Minister of Justice, and assigning Kamal el-Din Mahmoud Rifaat, Minister of Labour and Minister of State, to perform the duties of Minister of Social Affairs.

== Government formation ==
Office	Image	Name	Party	In office
Prime Minister		Gamal Abdel Nasser	Arab Socialist Union	6 March 1958 – 18 October 1961
Minister of War		Abdel Hakim Amer		6 March 1958 – 18 October 1961
Minister of Foreign Affairs		Mahmoud Fawzi		6 March 1958 – 18 October 1961
Minister of the Interior		Abbas Radwan		16 August 1961 – 18 October 1961
Minister of Economy and Treasury		Abdel Moneim el-Qaisouni		16 August 1961 – 18 October 1961
Minister of Economy and Treasury		Hassan Abbas Zaki		16 August 1961 – 18 October 1961
Minister of Economy and Treasury		Akram Dairi		16 August 1961 – 10 October 1961
Minister of Health		Nour El Din Tarraf		20 September 1960 – 18 October 1961
Minister of Health		Shawkat al-Qanawati		6 March 1958 – 10 October 1961
Minister of Local Administration		Abdul Mohsen Abu al-Nour		16 August 1961 – 18 October 1961
Minister of Local Administration		Jado Ezz al-Din		16 August 1961 – 10 October 1961
Minister of Religious Endowments		Ahmed Abdullah Taaima		24 October 1959 – 18 October 1961
Minister of Religious Endowments		Yusuf Mazahim		16 August 1961 – 10 October 1961
Minister of Supply		Kamal Estino		6 March 1958 – 18 October 1961
Minister of Supply		Jamal al-Soufi		16 August 1961 – 10 October 1961
Minister of Labour		Kamal el-Din Rifaat		16 August 1961 – 18 October 1961
Minister of Justice		Nihad al-Qasim		16 August 1961 – 10 October 1961
Minister of Justice		Zakaria Mohieddin		10 October 1961 – 18 October 1961
Minister of Public Works		Ahmed Abdu al-Sharbasi		7 October 1958 – 18 October 1961
Minister of Industry		Aziz Sedki		7 October 1958 – 18 October 1961
Minister of Transport		Mustafa Khalil Kamel		16 August 1961 – 18 October 1961
Minister of Agriculture and Agrarian Reform		Sayed Marei		7 October 1958 – 18 October 1961
Minister of Agrarian Reform		Ahmed Junaydi		16 August 1961 – 10 October 1961
Minister of Presidential Affairs		Ali Sabri		6 March 1958 – 18 October 1961
Minister of Housing and Utilities		Taama al-Ouda Allah		16 August 1961 – 10 October 1961
Minister of Culture and National Guidance		Tharwat Okasha		16 August 1961 – 18 October 1961
Minister of the High Dam		Mousa Arafa		16 August 1961 – 29 September 1962
Minister of Social Affairs		Thabet al-Aris		16 August 1961 – 10 October 1961
Minister of Social Affairs		Kamal el-Din Rifaat		10 October 1961 – 18 October 1961
Minister of Higher Education		Amjad al-Trabulsi		16 August 1961 – 10 October 1961
Minister of Education		Muhammad Yusuf		16 August 1961 – 18 October 1961
Minister of Scientific Research		Salah al-Din Hedayat		16 August 1961 – 18 October 1961
Minister of State for Agriculture and Land Reclamation		Ahmad al-Hajj Yunus		16 August 1961 – 10 October 1961
Minister of State for Agrarian Reform		Ahmed Mohamed al-Mahrouqi		16 August 1961 – 18 October 1961
Minister of State for Planning		Ahmed Ali Farag		16 August 1961 – 18 October 1961
Minister of State for Planning		Abdul Wahhab Hawmad		16 August 1961 – 10 October 1961
Minister of State		Ahmed Hosni		16 August 1961 – 18 October 1961
Minister of State		Fakhr al-Kilani		16 August 1961 – 10 October 1961
Minister of State		Muhammad Abdel Qader Hatem		20 September 1960 – 29 September 1962
Minister of State		Farid Zeineddine		16 August 1961 – 10 October 1961
Minister of State		Kamal el-Din Rifaat		7 October 1958 – 18 October 1961
