= Fourth Gamal Abdel Nasser government =

Government of the United Arab Republic in 1958

- 58th Syrian government 1st United Arab Republic government Council of Ministers of United Arab Republic

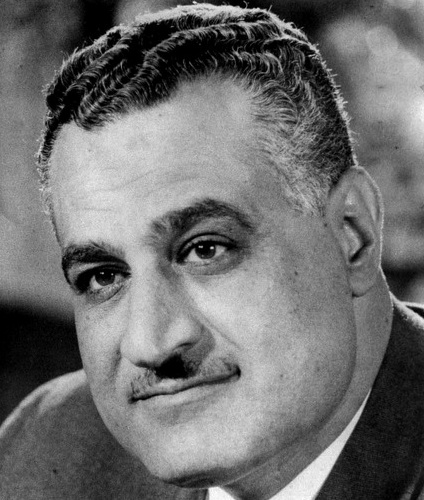
- Date formed: 6 March 1958
- Date dissolved: 7 October 1958

People and organisations
- President: Gamal Abdel Nasser
- President of the Council of Ministers: Gamal Abdel Nasser

History
- Predecessor: Fourth Sabri al-Asali government
- Successor: Fifth Gamal Abdel Nasser government

The Fourth Gamal Abdel Nasser government was the first government formed following the establishment of the United Arab Republic and the fifty-eighth government in the modern history of Syria. It was formed on 6 March 1958 as a central government based in Cairo, with three branches: a federal branch and regional branches for the Northern Region and Southern Region.

The government was later replaced by separate governments for the Northern and Southern Regions. During its tenure, it issued a number of important laws, including the Agrarian Reform Law.

== Vice presidents ==
The vice presidents were appointed under Article 1 of the decree appointing vice presidents and ministers in the Egyptian and Syrian regions, issued on 6 March 1958. Their responsibilities were defined in a decree issued on 29 March 1958.

- Abdel Latif Boghdadi – Vice President for Economic and Productive Affairs
- Akram al-Hawrani – Vice President for Social Affairs and Public Services
- Sabri al-Asali – Vice President for Affairs concerning the unity of the two regions, its stages and general affairs
- Abdel Hakim Amer – Vice President for Defence and the Armed Forces

== Cabinet composition ==
Position	Name	Region	Term
President of the Council of Ministers	Gamal Abdel Nasser		6 March 1958 – 18 October 1961
Minister of War	Abdel Hakim Amer		6 March 1958 – 18 October 1961
Minister of Foreign Affairs	Mahmoud Fawzi		6 March 1958 – 18 October 1961
Minister of Education	Kamal el-Din Hussein		6 March 1958 – 16 August 1961
Minister of Awqaf	Ahmed Hassan al-Baqouri		6 March 1958 – 10 February 1959
Minister of National Guidance	Fathy Radwan		6 March 1958 – 7 October 1958
Minister of Affairs of the Presidency of the Republic	Ali Sabri		6 March 1958 – 18 October 1961
Minister of Interior	Zakaria Mohieddin		6 March 1958 – 16 August 1961
Minister of Interior	Abdel Hamid al-Sarraj	Northern Region	6 March 1958 – 16 August 1961
Minister of Social Affairs and Labour	Hussein el-Shafei		6 March 1958 – 7 October 1958
Minister of Social Affairs and Labour	Mustafa Hamdoun	Northern Region	6 March 1958 – 7 October 1958
Minister of Public Health	Nour al-Din Tarraf	Southern Region	6 March 1958 – 7 October 1958
Minister of Health	Shawkat al-Qanawat	Northern Region	6 March 1958 – 16 August 1961
Minister of Justice	Ahmad Husni	Southern Region	6 March 1958 – 16 August 1961
Minister of Justice	Abd al-Wahhab Hawmad	Northern Region	6 March 1958 – 7 October 1958
Minister of the Treasury	Hassan Abbas Zaki	Southern Region	6 March 1958 – 7 October 1958
Minister of the Treasury	Fakhr al-Kayyali	Northern Region	6 March 1958 – 7 October 1958
Minister of Economy and Trade	Abdel Moneim El Qaysouni	Southern Region	6 March 1958 – 7 October 1958
Minister of Economy and Trade	Khalil al-Kallas	Northern Region	6 March 1958 – 7 October 1958
Minister of Public Works	Ahmad Abdu al-Sharbas	Southern Region	6 March 1958 – 7 October 1958
Minister of Public Works	Nur al-Din Kahala	Northern Region	6 March 1958 – 7 October 1958
Minister of Municipal and Rural Affairs	Muhammad Abu Nasir	Southern Region	6 March 1958 – 16 August 1961
Minister of Municipal and Rural Affairs	Ahmad Abd al-Karim	Northern Region	6 March 1958 – 20 September 1960
Minister of Transport	Mustafa Khalil Kamel Mustafa	Southern Region	6 March 1958 – 16 August 1961
Minister of Transport	Amin al-Nafouri	Northern Region	6 March 1958 – 7 October 1958
Minister of Agriculture	Sayed Marei	Southern Region	6 March 1958 – 7 October 1958
Minister of Agriculture	Ahmad al-Hajj Yunis	Northern Region	6 March 1958 – 16 August 1961
Minister of Planning	Hassan Jabbarah	Northern Region	6 March 1958 – 7 October 1958
Minister of Supply	Kamal Estino	Southern Region	6 March 1958 – 18 October 1961
Minister of Industry	Aziz Sedky	Southern Region	6 March 1958 – 7 October 1958
Minister of State for Agrarian Reform	Sayed Marei	Southern Region	6 March 1958 – 7 October 1958
Minister of State	Salah al-Din al-Bitar		6 March 1958 – 7 October 1958
