= Nakhla George al-Motyei Pasha =

Egyptian politician

24th Foreign Minister of Egypt
- In office 4 January 1933 – 10 May 1933
- Preceded by: Abdel Fattah Yahya Ibrahim Pasha
- Succeeded by: Salib Sami Bey

Personal details
- Born: 23 April 1866
- Died: 1951 (aged 84–85)

Nakhla Jurji al-Motyei Pasha (23 April 1866 – 1951) (Arabic: نخلة جورجى المطيعى باشا) was an Egyptian politician. He was Egypt's Minister of Foreign Affairs during the first half of 1933, in the government of Isma'il Sidqi.

== Career ==
Nakhla Jurji entered government service in 1883. He worked in the niyaba from 1891, then at the Ministry of Justice from 1904-1923. He was:

- Minister of Transportation, 24 November 1924 - 13 March 1925
- Interim Minister of Public Works, 1 December 1924 - 2 December 1924
- Minister of Agriculture, 12 September 1925 - 7 June 1926
- Minister of Public Works, 13 June 1928 - 2 October 1929
- Minister of Foreign Affairs 4 June 1933 - 10 July 1933.

Thereafter, he resigned due to ill health.
