= List of ministers of agriculture and land reclamation of Egypt =

The following is a list of ministers of agriculture and land reclamation of Egypt.

== List ==
=== Monarchical era (1873–1952) ===
#	Picture	Name	Took office	Left office	Days served	Cabinet	Under head of state
1		Mohamed Moheb Pasha	November 21, 1913	April 6, 1914		Muhammad Said Pasha	Abbas Helmi II
2		Ismail Sadky Pasha	April 5, 1914	December 19, 1914		Hussein Rushdi Pasha	Abbas Helmi II
3		Ahmed Hilmi Pasha	December 19, 1914	April 18, 1919		Hussein Rushdi Pasha	Hussein Kamel, Fuad I
4		Ahmed Medhat Yeghen Pasha	April 19, 1919	April 22, 1919	4	Muhammad Said Pasha	Fuad I of Egypt
5		Abdel Rahim Sabri Pasha	April 23, 1919	November 20, 1919		Muhammad Said Pasha	Fuad I of Egypt
6		Adly Barsoum Mikhael	November 21, 1919	March 3, 1920		Youssef Wahba Pasha	Fuad I of Egypt

== See also ==
- Cabinet of Egypt
