= AllBusiness.com =

American company

- Logo of AllBusiness.com
- Owners: Richard Harroch, Keith Belling, Jerry Engel
- Website: www.allbusiness.com
- Launched: 1999

AllBusiness.com provides business information and resources for small businesses, those companies with fewer than 500 employees. The company also conducts research to measure the health and direction of the small business sector.

== History ==
AllBusiness was cofounded in 1999 by San Francisco lawyer Richard Harroch, Keith Belling, and Jerry Engel. Harroch served as the company's chairman, Belling as CEO, and Engel as chief financial officer.

Within a year, AllBusiness grew to more than 100 employees and the company hired Teymour Boutros-Ghali (a nephew of former UN Secretary General Boutros Boutros-Ghali) as CEO and Belling moved to the position of President.

== Acquisition ==
AllBusiness was acquired by NBCi, the Internet venture of NBC, a subsidiary of General Electric, in March 2000 for $225 million USD. At the time, it was one of the largest purchases of a dot-com company. NBCi merged AllBusiness with an independent Internet company, BigVine.com, in November 2000 and the combined entity assumed the name AllBusiness.

The combined AllBusiness entity remained intact through April 2002 until being broken up and sold to various buyers, including Harroch, who bought back the original core assets of AllBusiness at that time.

AllBusiness is one of the few companies that survived the early Internet frenzy, the burst of the dot-com bubble and a slow recovery of the Internet publishing industry. AllBusiness raised $10 million USD in a series B round of venture capital funding in July 2004 (drawing only $5 million) and $12.4 million USD in a series C round of funding in February 2006.

In December 2007, Dun & Bradstreet acquired AllBusiness for $55 million USD. Today AllBusiness.com is part of D&B Digital, a group responsible for the free, advertising-supported Web sites owned by D&B. The site provides business content including articles, periodicals, videos, blogs and legal forms and agreements.

In January 2012, AllBusiness laid off its staff and Dun and Bradstreet put the domain up for sale. On March 31, 2012, Dun and Bradstreet reported on their form 10-Q that they had sold the AllBusiness.com domain to e-personalfinance.com for $400,000.

== See also ==
- Small Business Majority
