= Ministry of Foreign Affairs (Egypt) =

Government ministry of Egypt

Coordinates: 30°3′19″N 31°13′48″E

Arab Republic of Egypt Ministry of Foreign Affairs
- وزارة الخارجية
- Coat of arms of Egypt

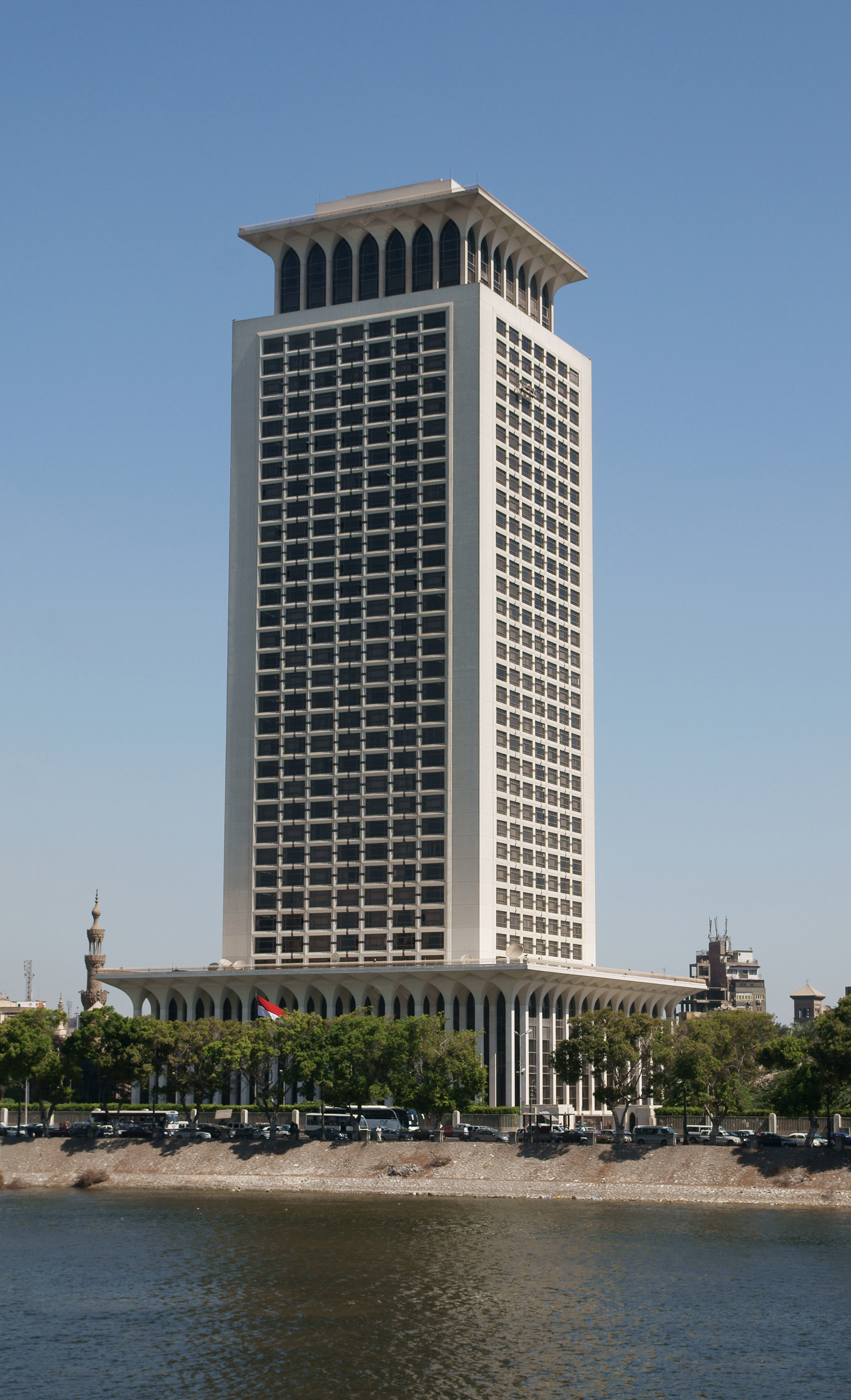

Agency overview
- Formed: 1922
- Jurisdiction: Government of Egypt
- Headquarters: New Administrative Capital, Cairo Governorate
- Minister responsible: Badr Abdelatty
- Deputy Minister responsible: Hamdi Loz
- Website: Official website

The Ministry of Foreign Affairs of the Arab Republic of Egypt (Arabic: وزارة الخارجية المصرية) is the Egyptian government ministry which oversees the foreign relations of Egypt. On 3 July 2024 Badr Abdelatty was appointed Minister of Foreign Affairs.

== History ==
=== Early history ===
In the 19th century, the ministry was one of the divans established by Muhammad Ali Pasha, known as the 'founder of modern Egypt'. The aim of the ministry was to organize Egypt's internal, and external affairs, and was concerned with trade, and commerce. Later, it became the Divan of Foreign Affairs, and was concerned with trade, and citizen's affairs. It continued to function after the Muhammad Ali's reign, and it was one of the fundamental divans of the state. It was concerned with abolishing slavery, and following up international treaties. During the era of Sa'id Pasha, and Isma'il Pasha, there were some modifications in the ministry, due to the increasing presence of the Europeans in Egypt.

Due to the change of rule in Egypt in 1878, the absolute jurisdictions given to rulers were diminished, and the divans were replaced by portfolios. During this period, the foreign portfolio was headed by prominent figures such as Boutros Ghali, who spent the longest period in office from 1894 to 1910.

The foreign portfolio was put to an end after the declaration of the British Protectorate over Egypt in 1914.

=== Reestablishment ===
After Egyptian independence was officially recognised by the United Kingdom on 22 February 1922, the Ministry of Foreign affairs was re-established on 15 March 1922. Ahmed Heshmat Pasha, who became the first Minister of Foreign Affairs in 1923, laid the cornerstone of the organizational structure of the ministry and took Al Bustan Palace in Bab El Louk, a palace owned by King Fuad, to be the first official headquarters to his ministry. He divided the ministry into four main departments, the minister's divan, the department of political and commercial affairs, the department of consular affairs, and the department of administrative affairs.

In 1925, the first special decree regarding the consular system was issued, and also the decree regarding the system of the political positions.

Although the reestablishment of the ministry was approved, the continuing British occupation of the country imposed restrictions on the level of the Egyptian diplomatic representation abroad.

After the Anglo-Egyptian Treaty of 1936, diplomatic representation of Egypt was raised to be at the same level as the diplomatic representation in London. Under the treaty, Britain recognised Egypt's right to raise its diplomatic representation to the level of "ambassador" which in turn enabled Egypt to join the League of Nations in 1937. This enabled Egyptian diplomacy to have a role in the international arena once more.

The Egyptian diplomatic representation spread to many parts of the world. During this period, the Egyptian consular representation spread more than the diplomatic representation due to the large number of consuls who already functioned in cities like London, and Liverpool in Britain, Paris, Marseille, and Lyon in France, and Berlin, and Hamburg in Germany.

The aftermath of the Second World War had a great impact on the Egyptian diplomatic performance through the structural changes made by the Egyptian ministers at that time in order to cope with the profound changes created by the war. After the end of the war, the Egyptian ministers made changes to cope with the effect of the war.

=== The ministry after the Egyptian Revolution of 1952 ===
The Egyptian Revolution of 1952 led to transformation of the organisational structure of the ministry. On 21 September 1955, law number 453 was issued to define the role of the Foreign Ministry in implementing Egyptian foreign policy, developing foreign relations of Egypt with foreign governments, and international organisations, protecting Egyptian interests abroad, issuing diplomatic passports, and following up issues related to diplomatic immunities and privileges. In 1966, the ministry set up the Institute for Diplomatic Studies.

In 1979, the Egyptian foreign minister, Boutros Boutros-Ghali, decided to reorganise the ministry to deal with the new circumstances following the Egyptian–Israeli Peace Treaty, and the following year, Foreign Minister Kamal Hassan, reorganised the ministry in order to develop the internal work mechanisms, and also worked on enhancing the Diplomatic Institute.

Hosni Mubarak became the president of Egypt on 14 October 1981, after which the ministry went through a comprehensive reform process. For the first time in 30 years, the law related to the Diplomatic and Consular Corps was modified. Consequently, Law Number 45 for year 1982 regarding the Diplomatic and Consular Corps was issued to cope with the new prospects of the Egyptian diplomatic and consular relations, according to the two Vienna Conventions on Diplomatic and Consular Relations which Egypt joined in the 1960s.

In the 1990s, a restructuring process for the Egyptian diplomatic practice took place. This process was influenced by the factors affecting the international arena such as the information and technological revolution, the increase in the role of non-governmental organisations in international relations, and the emergence of economic globalisation.

== Decision-making process ==
The ministry is responsible for conducting the Egypt's foreign relations within the framework of the Egyptian cabinet. It plays an essential role in collecting and evaluating political, economic, cultural, and scientific information that may affect foreign relations. It is also responsible for planning and implementing Egyptian foreign policy, and co-ordinating with the other Egyptian ministries and institutions concerned.

After the Egyptian Revolution of 1952, the decision-making patterns in the ministry underwent alteration. Such alteration depended mainly on the nature of the relationship between the presidential institution and the ministry, and on the sort of issues with which the decision-maker is dealing. The changes made to the decision-making process also took into consideration the efficiency with which the ministry will operate if it functioned independently without obtaining assistance or information from other institutions and ministries.

The Egyptian political leadership has made way for the ministry and other institutions to participate actively in the decision-making process through consultations, and accepting suggestions.

== The role of the ministry ==
The ministry oversees the foreign relations of Egypt. It engages in Egypt's comprehensive development efforts by trying to attract foreign investments, acquire economic assistance, and facilitate technology transfer. There are specialized departments for international cooperation and economic relations have been established within the ministry to achieve these goals. They also coordinate and cooperate with other Egyptian ministries and institutions working in those domains.

Traditional relationships with other Arab and African states are maintained mainly through interactions with regional organisations such as the Arab League, and the African Union. Bilateral relations with these states are also promoted through undertaking continuous consultations, widening the scope of cooperation in various fields, as well as exchanging expertise in the different areas of development. Egypt's strategic relationships with the United States, and European states are also maintained by the ministry.

The ministry co-operates with the international community through international organisations such as the United Nations, and tries to play an active role in the UN, its specialised agencies, and several other international institutions to foster international peace, security, and economic development.

The ministry also helps to promote understanding of Egyptian culture through the cultural sector of the Foreign Ministry. The cultural sector co-operates with other Egyptian institutions, such as Al-Azhar University, the Supreme Council for Islamic Affairs, and the Egyptian Ministry of Education to offer scholarships and training courses to African, and Asian students.

== See also ==
- Cabinet of Egypt
- Minister of Foreign Affairs (Egypt)

Records
| Preceded by El Maadi Residential Towers | Tallest building in Egypt; 143 m (469 ft); 1994 – 2024 | Succeeded by Iconic Tower |
| Preceded by El Maadi Residential Towers | Tallest building in Cairo; 143 m (469 ft); 1994 – present | Incumbent |
