= Mohammed Murad Ghaleb =

Epytian politician and diplomat

Murad Ghaleb
- مراد غالب
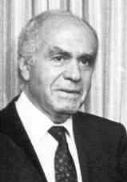

Secretary-General of the Afro-Asian People's Solidarity Organisation
- In office 1 November 1988 – 18 April 2007

Minister of Foreign Affairs
- In office 18 January 1972 – 8 September 1972
- President: Anwar Sadat
- Preceded by: Mahmoud Riad
- Succeeded by: Mohammed Hassan El-Zayyat

Personal details
- Born: 1 April 1922 Sharqia, Egypt
- Died: April 18, 2007 (aged 85) Cairo, Egypt
- Party: Arab Socialist Union
- Education: Alexandria University; Cairo University

Muhammad Murad Ghaleb (1 April 1922 – 18 December 2007 in Cairo) was an Egyptian politician and diplomat.

== Career ==
Ghaleb studied medicine at Cairo University. A supporter of the 1952 Egyptian revolution, he served as Vice-Minister for Foreign Affairs from 1955 to 1960. From 1960-1961 he served as ambassador of Egypt to Congo, and then to the Soviet Union until 1971. In September 1971 he was appointed Minister of State for Foreign Affairs and served as Minister of Foreign Affairs from January to September 1972. In 1973-1974 he served in a diplomatic post in Libya, and then as ambassador to Yugoslavia until 1977, when he resigned from the Ministry of Foreign Affairs in protest of President Anwar Sadat's visit to Jerusalem. From then onward he dealt with activities for Third World countries, and from 1988 until his death he served as president of Afro-Asian Peoples' Solidarity Organization, with its headquarters in Cairo.

== Honours and awards ==
=== Foreign honours ===
- Grand Cross of the Order of the Sun of Peru (15 August 1972)

Political offices
Preceded by Mahmoud Riad	Foreign Minister of Egypt; 1972	Succeeded by Mohammed Hassan El-Zayyat
