= Hussein Fakhry Pasha =

19th-century Prime Minister of Egypt

Hussein Fakhry Pasha KCMG
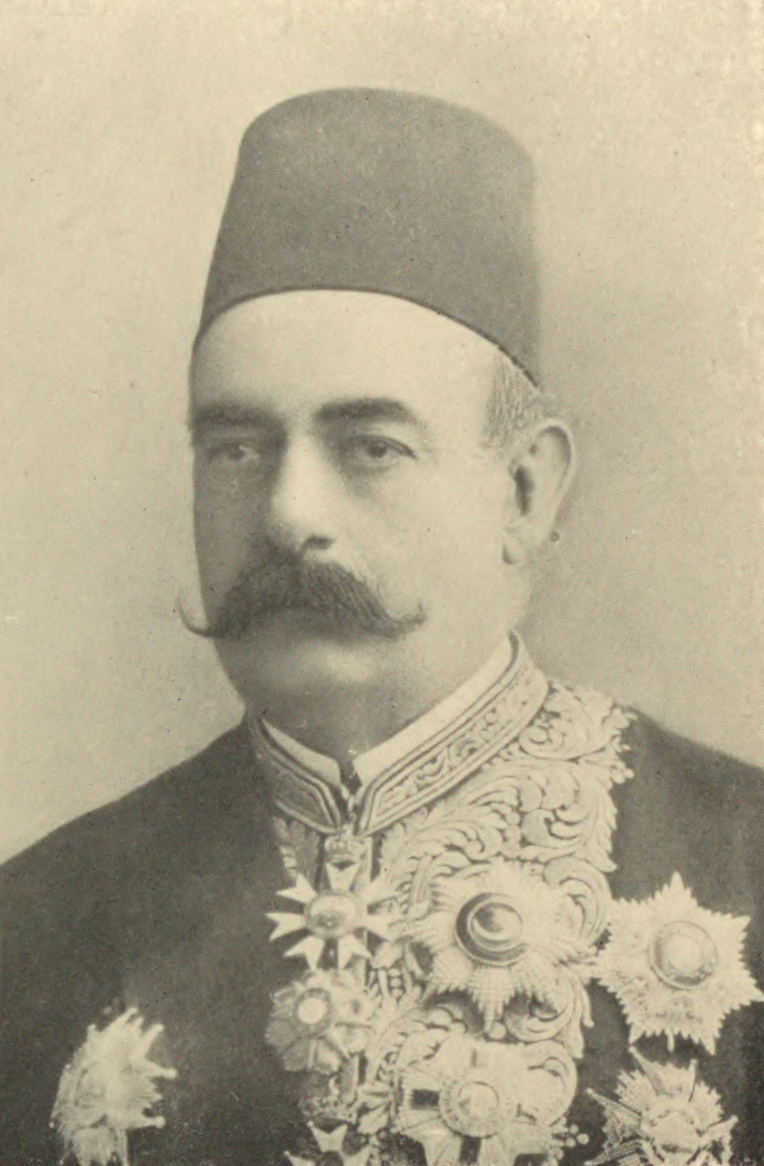

8th Prime Minister of Egypt
- In office 15 January 1893 – 17 January 1893
- Monarch: Abbas II
- Preceded by: Mustafa Fahmi Pasha
- Succeeded by: Riyad Pasha

Personal details
- Born: 1843
- Died: 1920

Hussein Fakhry Pasha KCMG (1843-1920) was the Prime Minister of Egypt for two days during the Khedivate of Egypt. He was Prime Minister from January 15, 1893 to January 17, 1893. He had previously served as a cabinet minister. He was Minister of Public Works during the building of the Aswan Low Dam and was appointed an Honorary Knight Commander of the Order of St Michael and St George in December 1902.

== Personal life ==
He was of Circassian origin. His son, Mahmoud Fakhry, served as the minister of finance and minister of foreign affairs during the 1920s.

Political offices
Preceded by Mostafa Fahmy Pasha	Prime Minister of Egypt; 1893–1893	Succeeded by Riaz Pasha
