= Riyad Pasha =

Former Prime Minister of Egypt

Mostafa Riyad Pasha GCMG
- مصطفى رياض باشا
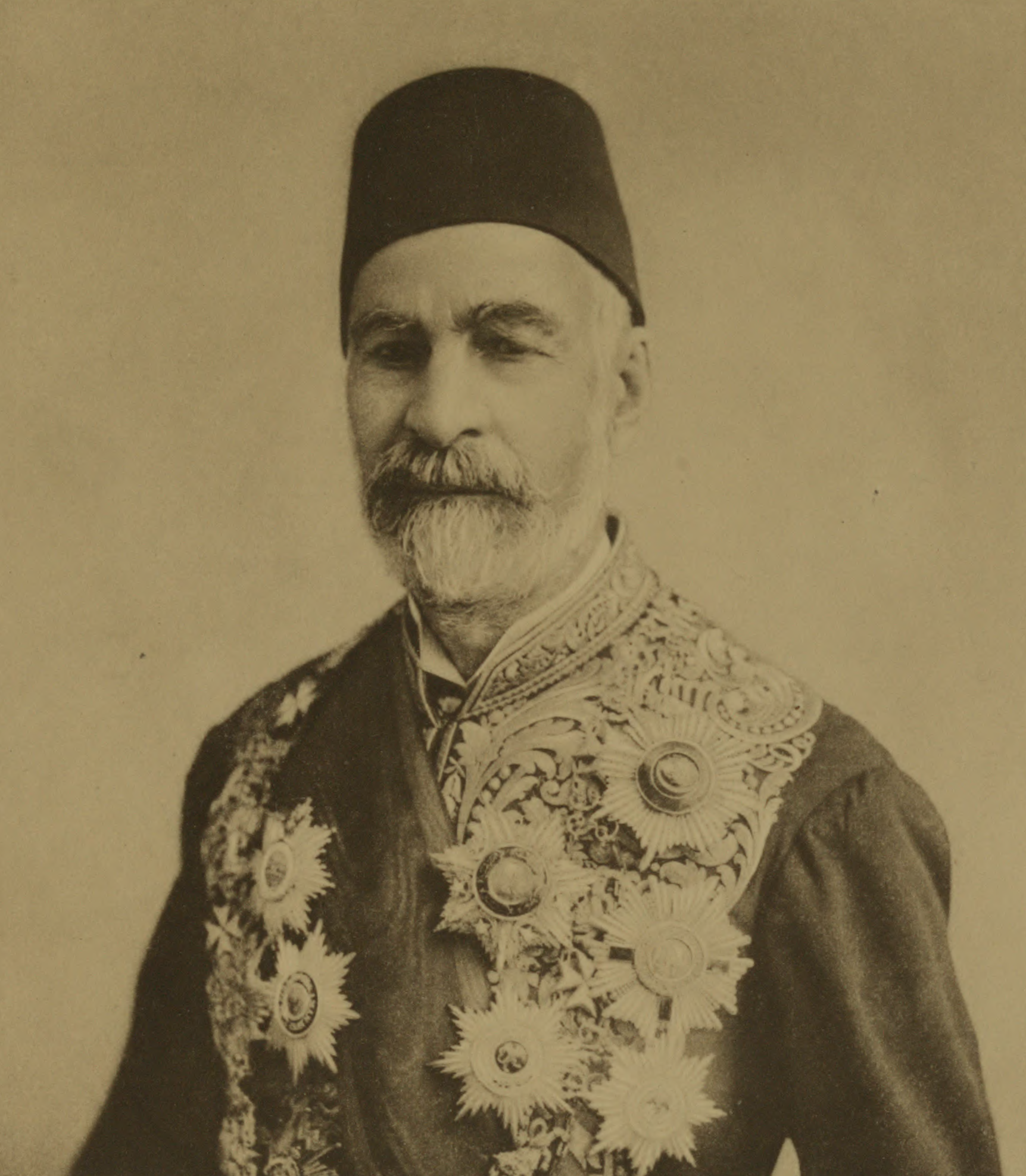

4th Prime Minister of Egypt
- In office 17 January 1893 – 16 April 1894
- Monarch: Abbas II
- Preceded by: Hussein Fakhry Pasha
- Succeeded by: Nubar Pasha
- In office 9 June 1888 – 12 May 1891
- Monarch: Tewfik Pasha
- Preceded by: Nubar Pasha
- Succeeded by: Mostafa Fahmy Pasha
- In office 21 September 1879 – 10 September 1881
- Monarch: Tewfik Pasha
- Preceded by: Tewfik Pasha (Acting)
- Succeeded by: Mohamed Sherif Pasha

Personal details
- Born: 1835 or 1836 Cairo, Egypt
- Died: 1911

Mostafa Riyad Pasha GCMG (1835 or 1836–1911) was a Circassian-Eygptian statesman. His name can also be spelled Mostāfā Riāḍ Bāshā (Egyptian Arabic: مصطفى رياض باشا). He served as Prime Minister of Egypt three times during his career. His first term was between September 21, 1879 and September 10, 1881. His second term was from June 9, 1888 to May 12, 1891. His final term lasted from January 17, 1893 to April 16, 1894.

== Origin and ascension ==
Riyad was of a Circassian family, but was said to be of Jewish ancestry. Little is known of his early life, except that, until the accession of Isma'il Pasha to the Khedivate of Egypt in 1863, he occupied a relatively humble position.

Ismail, reportedly recognizing in this obscure individual a capacity for hard work and a strong will, made him one of his ministers. When Ismail's financial straits compelled him to agree to a commission of inquiry, Riyad was named as a vice-president of the commission. He filled this office with distinction, but not to the liking of Ismail.

Khedive Ismail, however, felt compelled to nominate Riyad as a member of the first Egyptian cabinet, when he assumed the position of a constitutional monarch in 1878. For the few months this government lasted (September 1878 - April 1879) Riyad was minister of the interior. When Ismail dismissed the cabinet and attempted to resume autocratic rule, Riyad fled the country.

== Administration ==
Upon the deposal of Ismail, in June 1879, Riyad was sent for by the British and French controllers, and he formed the first ministry under Khedive Tawfiq. His administration lasted only two years, and was overthrown by a movement with Urabi Pasha. Riyad treated the beginnings of this movement as of no consequence. In reply to a warning of what might happen he said, "But this is Egypt; such things do not happen; you say they have happened elsewhere, perhaps, but this is Egypt." He held the additional titles of Minister of Finance and Minister of Interior from 1879 to 1881. On the evening of 9 September 1881, after a military demonstration in Abdin Square, Riyad was dismissed; broken in health he went to Europe, remaining at Geneva until the fall of Urabi.

After Urabi's fall, Riyad accepted office as minister of the interior under Muhammad Sharif Pasha. Riyad wanted Urabi and his associates executed; so when the British insisted that clemency should be extended to the leaders of the revolt, Riyad refused to remain in office as interior minister, resigning in December 1882.

He took no further part in public affairs until 1888, when, on the dismissal of Nubar Pasha, he was summoned to form a government. He now understood that the only policy possible for an Egyptian statesman was to work in harmony with the British agent, Sir Evelyn Baring (later known as Lord Cromer). This he succeeded in doing to a large extent, witnessing if not initiating the practical abolition of the corvée and many other reforms. The appointment of an Anglo-Indian official as judicial adviser to the khedive was, however, opposed by Riyad, who resigned in May 1891.

In January 1893, he again became prime minister under Abbas II, being selected as comparatively acceptable both to the khedivial and British parties. In April 1894 Riyad finally resigned office on account of ill-health.

Political offices
Preceded by Muhammad Sharif Pasha	Prime Minister of Egypt; 1879–1881	Succeeded by Muhammad Sharif Pasha
Preceded by Nubar Pasha	Prime Minister of Egypt; 1888–1891	Succeeded by Mustafa Fahmi Pasha
Preceded by Hussein Fahri Pasha	Prime Minister of Egypt; 1893–1894	Succeeded by Nubar Pasha
