= Yeghen family =

Egyptian aristocratic family related to the royal family

Yeghen (Arabic: يكن)
- Aristocratic family
- Country: Egypt
- Founded: 19th century
- Founder: Miralay Mustafa Bey
- Titles: List: Pasha; Bey or Bek; Khanum or Hanim; Effendi
- Styles: List: Sahib-ul-Ma'ali; Sahibat-ul-Ma'ali; Sahib-ul-Sa'ada; Sahibat-ul-Sa'ada

Yeghen family, also known as Yakan (Arabic: عائلة يكن; Turkish: Yeğen ailesi; name meaning "Nephew") is an Egyptian aristocratic family that had prominent members since the start of the Muhammad Ali dynasty. They are closely related to the royal family.

== Overview, history and name ==
The Yeghen family descends from the Miralay Mustafa Bey, who married Zubayda Khanum, a sister of Muhammad Ali Pasha. Despite the family not being of direct lineage to Muhammed Ali Pasha, they were still heavily connected to royalty and maintained significant roles and influence in the country due to their close blood relation to the ruling family.

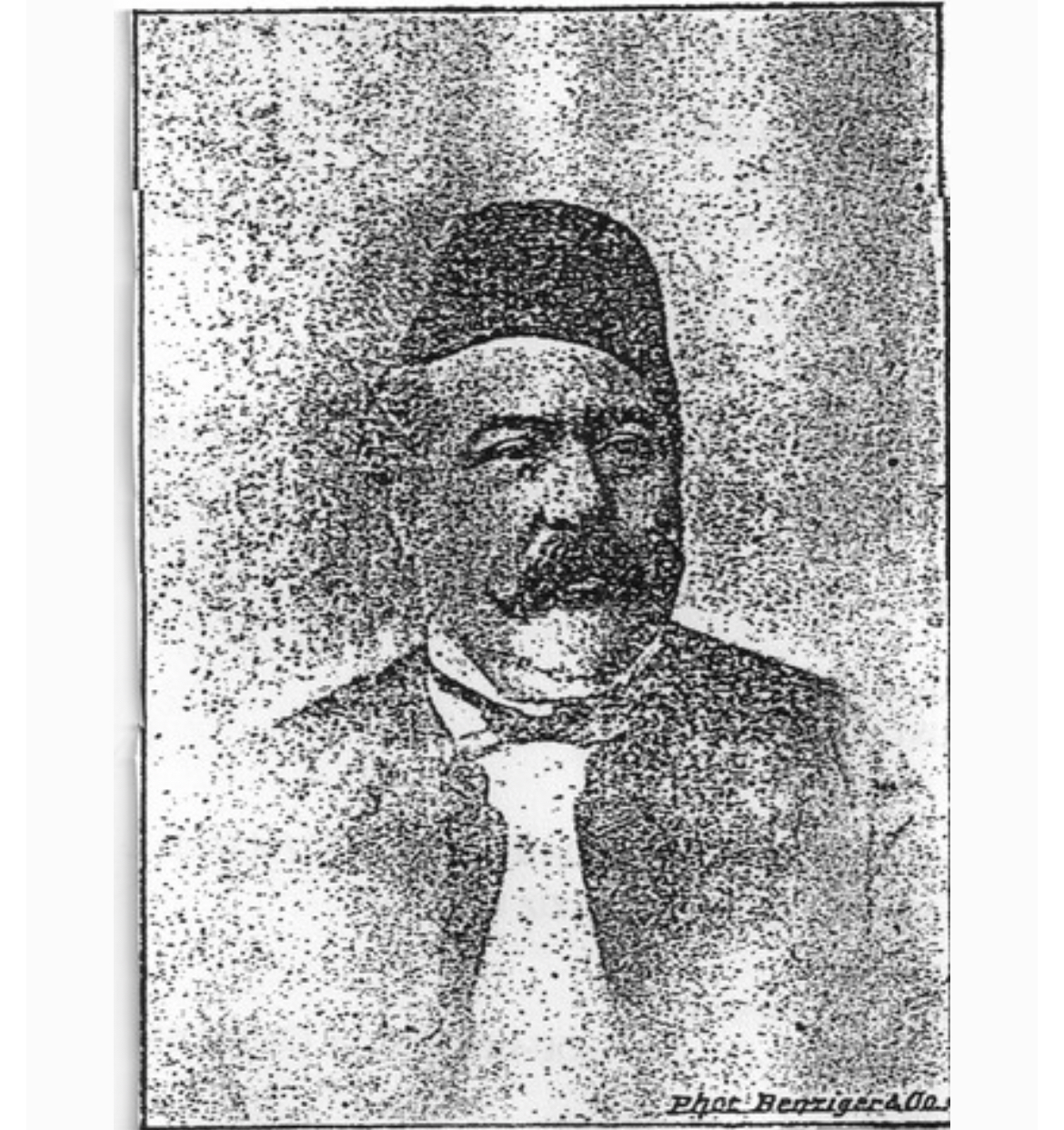
Mansur Yeghen Pasha

During the Muhammad Ali dynasty, the Yeghen family played significant political and economic roles in modern Egypt. Two of the many nephews of the Pasha, Ahmed and Ibrahim Yeghen Pasha, served as senior commanders during the expansion of the Egyptian military that took an estimated 2 million acres of land and crushed the Ottomans twice. Members of the family assumed several high-ranking positions within the government. Among the prominent members was Adly Yeghen Pasha, the 14th Prime Minister of Egypt, who also held important positions such as Foreign Minister and Speaker of the Egyptian Senate. Another member was Ahmed Medhat Yeghen Pasha, who served as Minister of Agriculture and was the co-founder of the Banque Misr.

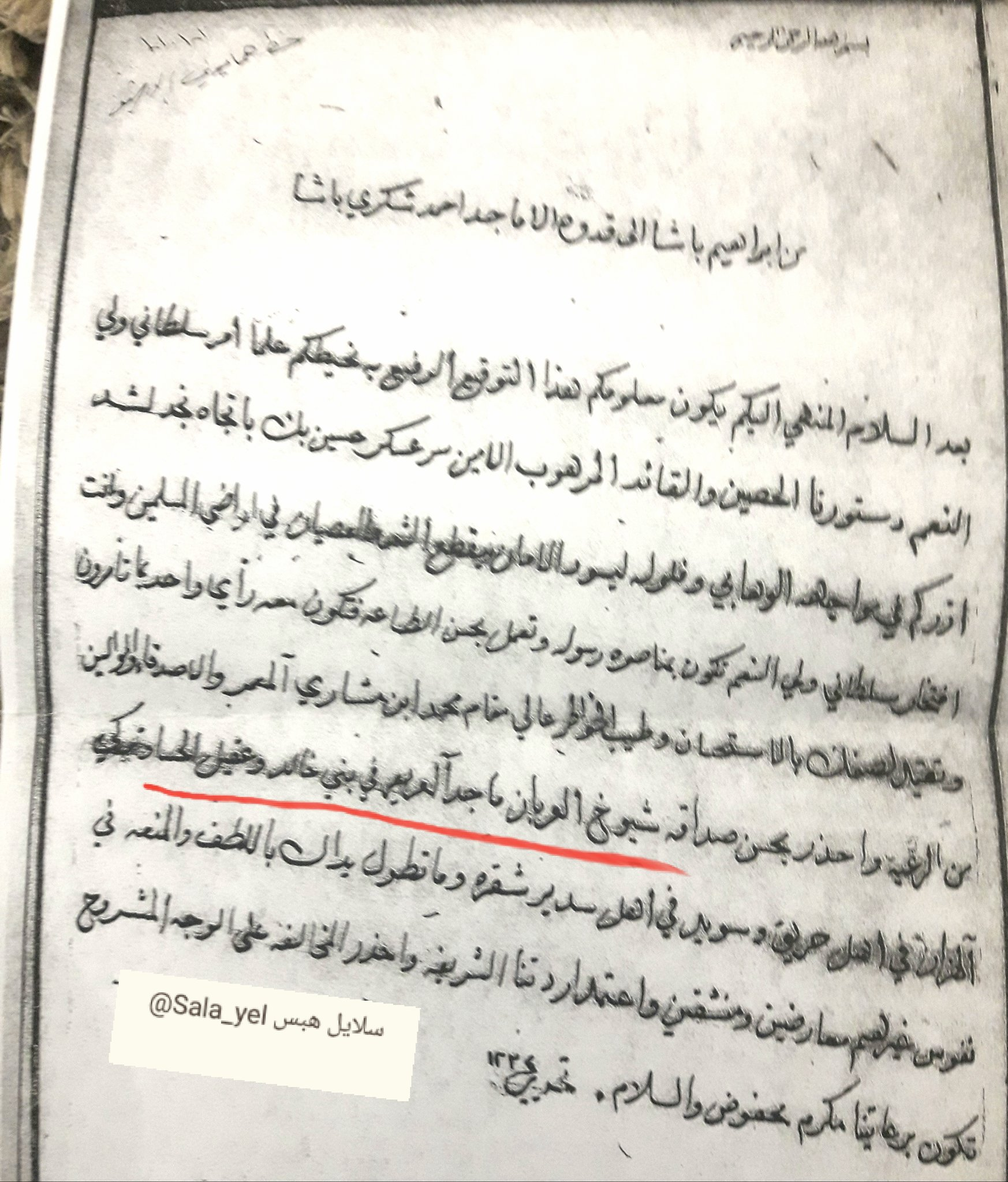
Letter from Ibrahim Pasha to his 1st cousin Ahmed Yeghen Pasha, telling him to befriend the sheikhs on their way to Najd, specifically Sheikh Majed bin Ariar

The Yeghen family maintained strong ties to the ruling khedival line and noble families of Egypt through marriage. Yehya Mansur Yeghen Pasha married Isma'il's eldest daughter, Princess Tawhida. He was the mushir of the Egyptian army, minister of education, and was the director-general of agriculture. Naila Hanim, another member of the Yeghen family, married Sherif Sabri Pasha, brother of Queen Nazli. Additionally, not only did they marry cousins from the khedival line and noble families of Egypt, some married Ottoman princes. Mediha Momtaz, a member of the Yeghen family, married Prince Sultanzade Abbas Hilmi of Egypt and Turkey. Another two members of the Yeghen family, a pair of sisters, married two Ottoman princes. Barkamal Khanum married Şehzade Muhammad ‘Abdu’l-Aziz and Nafia Khanum married Şehzade Muhammad Orhan.

== Notable members ==
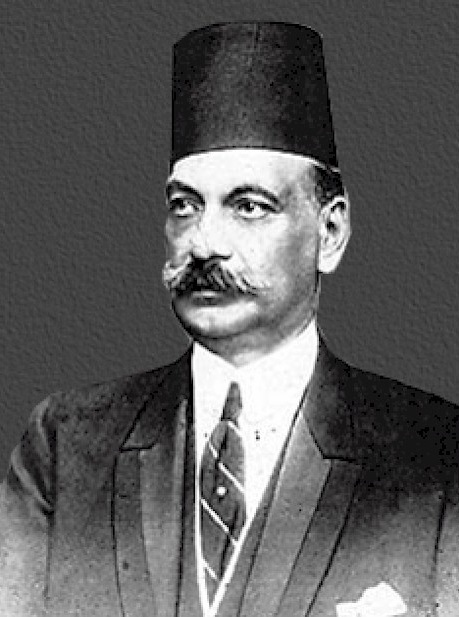
Adly Yeghen Pasha

- Adly Yakan Pasha (1864–1933): 14th prime minister of Egypt and minister of foreign affairs. He had 1 daughter, Naila Hanim, who married Sherif Sabry Pasha.
- Ahmed Medhat Yeghen Pasha (1878–1944): Governor of Alexandria and minister of Agriculture. He had one daughter, Princess Tewhida.
- Ahmed Shukri Yeghen Pasha (1799–1856), nephew of Muhammad Ali Pasha, Lieutenant general commander-in-chief of the Egyptian Forces in the Hijaz 1820–1829 and 1833–1841, director General of war department 1829–1833. He served as governor of Jeddah and Mecca.
- Ibrahim Yeghen Pasha (1801–1842) Lieutenant general, nephew of Muhammad Ali Pasha, Governor of al-Gharbiya, and served during the Syrian campaign.
- Da'ud Pasha (1837–1917): succeeded al-Barudi as War Minister in August 1881.
- Saleh Rushdi Yeghen Pasha (1851–1912): served as minister of Finance.
- Khalil Yeghen Pasha (d.1820), nephew of Muhammad Ali Pasha and Governor of Alexandria 1816–1818
- Dr Adly Kotry Bey (1903-1995): prominent dermatologist and elite in society. President of the Mowsaat Hospital for 25 years. He married his cousin, Naila Hanim, a descendant of the Khedive Ismail, Prince Mohamed Ali Al Sagheer, and the Yeghen Line. He had two children.
- Dr Shafik Kotry Bey (d.1983): brother of Dr Adly, prominent gynecologist and elite in society. He married his cousin, Sania Hanim, from the Yeghen line. He had two children.
- Princess Tawhida Yeghen: granddaughter of Princess Tawhida Ismail and Ahmed Medhat Yeghen Pasha. She married Prince Abbas Halim and had 3 children.

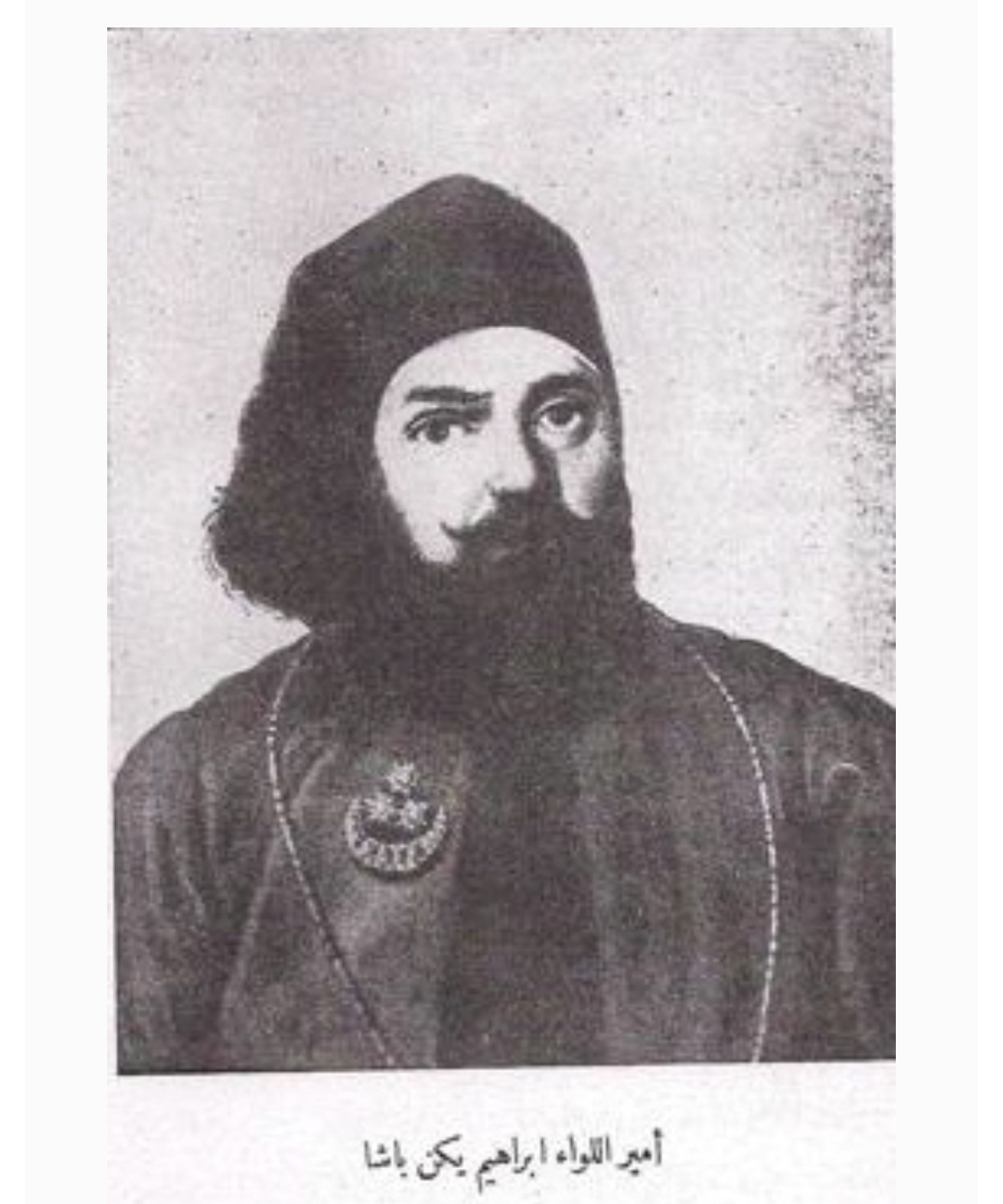
Ibrahim Yeghen Pasha, nephew of Muhammad Ali Pasha (not to be confused with Ibrahim Pasha, the son of Muhammad Ali Pasha)

== Burials ==
A majority of the members who lived during the 19th century and early 20th century are buried in the royal mausoleum, Hosh el Pasha. Many members are also buried in their branch's own mausoleum and cemetery. Muhammad Yeghen is currently fighting to save some of the burial sites from demolition.

== Bayt Yakan ==
The iconic "Bayt Yakan" residence, now owned by Dr. Alaa el Habachi, used to belong to the Yeghens. It is in the area known as "Al Yakaneya"; the neighborhood was a gift from Muhammad Ali Pasha to his nephews and was where they owned homes. It is unsure if it was Ahmed Pasha or Ibrahim Pasha who owned the house itself, but it belonged to one of the two nephews that commanded the army.

While not a World Heritage Site itself, Bayt Yakan is recognized by UNESCO for its successful transformation into a zero-energy building, something which is documented on the UNESCO World Heritage "Canopy" webpage. The library houses very rare and important books. Other than being a place for visitation, it is also used for workshops which raise awareness about the heritage of Cairo, workshops that the local community attend.

== See also ==
- Muhammad Ali dynasty
- El-Emam family
- Abaza family
- Pasha
