= Wasif Boutros Ghali =

Egyptian writer, diplomat and politician (1878–1958)

Wacyf Boutros Ghali
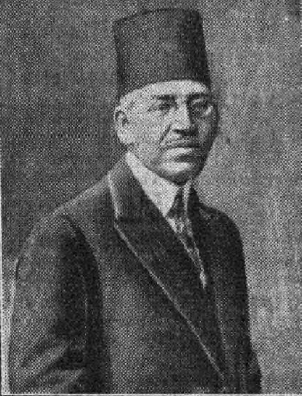

18th Foreign Minister of Egypt
- In office 28 January 1923 – 24 November 1924
- Monarch: Fuad I
- In office 16 March 1928 – 25 June 1928
- In office 1 January 1930 – 19 June 1930
- In office 9 May 1936 – 30 December 1937

Personal details
- Born: 1878
- Died: 1958 (aged 79–80)
- Party: Wafd
- Profession: Politician, writer, Diplomat

Wacyf Boutros Ghali (1878–1958) (Arabic: واصف بطرس غالي) was an Egyptian writer, diplomat, and political figure. He was appointed Foreign Minister of Egypt four times: in 1924, 1928, 1930 and between 1936 and 1937.

== Biography ==
Ghali was a son of Egyptian Prime Minister Boutros Ghali. Born into a Coptic Orthodox Christian family, he was part of the French-speaking elite of Egypt. His older brother Youssef was the father of Boutros Boutros-Ghali, who became Secretary General of the United Nations. After studying law in France, he worked from 1905 to 1911 in the khedive's European chancery. From 1911 he was in France, holding a chair in Arabic Literature at the EHES from 1914. He married a Frenchwoman and had his books published in Paris. After the war, he returned to Egypt. He was a member of the Wafd Party. He was Egypt's principal representative at the 1937 Montreux conference. He received the Grand Cross of the Legion of Honor in 1939. He was a director of the Suez Canal Company from 1950 to 1956.

== Publications ==
- Le jardin des fleurs, essais sur la poésie arabe, et morceaux choisis (1913).
- Les perles éparpillées, contes et légendes arabes (1919).
- La tradition chevaleresque des Arabes (1919).
- Pour le peuple égyptien (1920).

== Sources ==
- Arthur Goldschmidt Jr., "The Butrus Ghali Family", Journal of the American Research Center in Egypt, Vol. 30 (1993), p. 182-88.
- Raouf Kamel, Wacyf Ghali, l'écrivain (Cairo: IFAO, 1960).
