= Badr Abdelatty =

Egyptian diplomat and politician (born 1966)

- بدر عبد العاطي
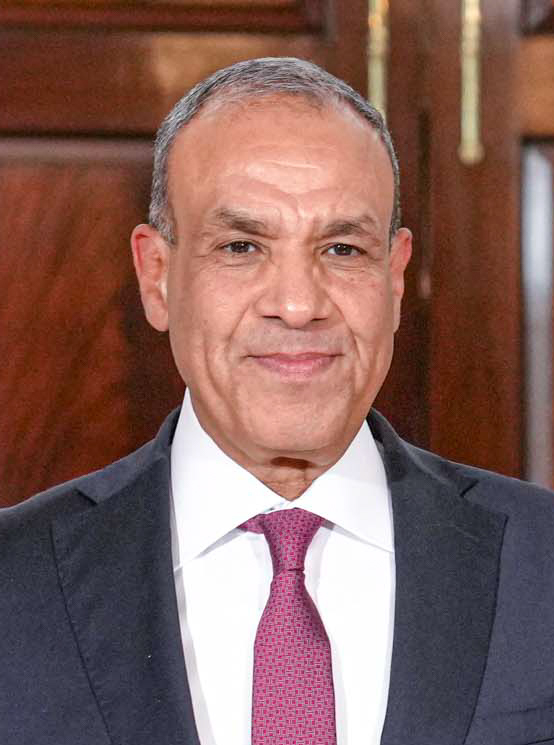
- Abdelatty in 2025

Minister of Foreign Affairs
- Incumbent
- Assumed office 3 July 2024
- Prime Minister: Mostafa Madbouly
- Preceded by: Sameh Shoukry

Personal details
- Born: 8 February 1966 (age 60) Asyut Governorate, Egypt
- Education: Cairo University

Badr Ahmed Mohamed Abdelatty (Arabic: بدر أحمد محمد عبد العاطي; born 8 February 1966) is an Egyptian diplomat and politician serving as minister of foreign affairs since 2024.

== Career ==
Abdelatty, born in Asyut Governorate, earned a BA in political science in 1987. He went on to earn an MA and PhD in International Relations in 1996 from Cairo University.

He served as Egypt's Ambassador to Germany (2015–2019), playing a key role in strengthening Egyptian-German relations during Angela Merkel's tenure. Previously, he was Deputy Assistant Foreign Minister and spokesperson for the Foreign Ministry (2013–2015), as well as Deputy Assistant Minister for EU and Western Europe Affairs. He held various prominent roles, including National Coordinator for the Union for the Mediterranean (2012–2013), Deputy Head of Mission in Brussels (2008–2012), and Director of Palestinian Affairs at the Egyptian Foreign Ministry (2007–2008).

Earlier, he served in Washington (2003–2007), Tokyo (1997–2001), and Tel Aviv (1991–1995), handling African, Middle Eastern, and peace process issues. Additionally, he lectured at Nasser Military Academy in 2003 and authored works on international politics.
