= Ministry of Agriculture and Land Reclamation (Egypt) =

Government ministry of Egypt

Coordinates: 30°2′35″N 31°12′35″E

Arab Republic of Egypt Ministry of Agriculture and Land Reclamation
- وزارة الزراعة وإستصلاح الأراضي
- Emblem of Egypt

Agency overview
- Jurisdiction: Government of Egypt
- Headquarters: New Administrative Capital, Cairo Governorate
- Agency executive: El-Said Marzouq El-Qosair (as of the 22nd of December 2019), Minister
- Child agencies: Desert Research Center (DRC); Central Administration of Plant Quarantine
- Website: Official website

The Ministry of Agriculture and Land Reclamation of Egypt is a ministerial body in charge of agriculture and land reclamation in Egypt.

== History ==
The Ministry of Agriculture was established on 20 November 1913. In 1996, it was renamed Ministry of Agriculture and Land Reclamation. One of its goals is to address sustainability in agriculture such as better ways to do agricultural irrigation.

In 2016, an agency from Switzerland was put in charge of inspecting Egypt's imported wheat. Egypt imports the most wheat of any country and around 40% of the average Egyptians' income is spent on food.

== Farmland ==
As of 2000, small farms (between 5 and 6 feddans) accounted for most (49.61%) of the agricultural land ownership in Egypt. 34.72% of farm holdings were of 1 feddan or less. The hope is that with desalination plants, new wells and better infrastructure farmers will be able to grow more wheat.

In April 2018 Egypt purchased wheat from local farmers but not at a price farmers found sustainable.

== Land reclamation ==
A land reclamation project began in 2015, near the town of Farafra. Large government and private investment and initiatives in farming the Sahara Desert have sometimes ended with little to show.

In June 2017, it was announced 1.7 million feddans had been reclaimed and according to the Egyptian Prime Minister, Sherif Ismail, this work would continue. It was President Abdel Fattah el-Sisi who, in May 2017, asked for the armed services to begin reclaiming land by demolishing illegally erected structures on land not owned by builders or squatters.

== Ministers ==
- Ayman Farid Abu-Hadid - from July 2013
- Adel Tawfik al-Sayed al-Beltagy
- Mahmoud Salah Eddin Hilal
- Essam Fayed - from September 2015
- Abdul Moneim El-Banna - from February 2017
- El-Said Marzouq El-Qosair - from December 2019

== See also ==
- Cabinet of Egypt
- List of ministers of agriculture and land reclamation of Egypt
- Egyptian land reform
- New Valley Project
