= Teymour Boutros-Ghali =

American investor and businessman

Teymour Boutros-Ghali is an investor and entrepreneur.

He earned his BA in Electrical Engineering from Cambridge University, a PhD in Plasma Physics from MIT and a SM in Management from the Sloan School of Management.

After starting his career at the Boston Consulting Group, Teymour was a Senior Executive with Time Warner both in operations and investments.

He was CEO of AllBusiness (which was sold to NBC), Zowie Intertainment (acquired by LEGO) and Thrive Online (sold to AOL).

He is co-founder and Managing Partner of BOLD Capital Partners, an investment partnership formed with Peter Diamandis and Singularity University. He was also co-founder and Managing Partner of Monitor Ventures.
