= Sayed Marei =

Egyptian engineer and politician (1913–1993)

- سيد مرعي
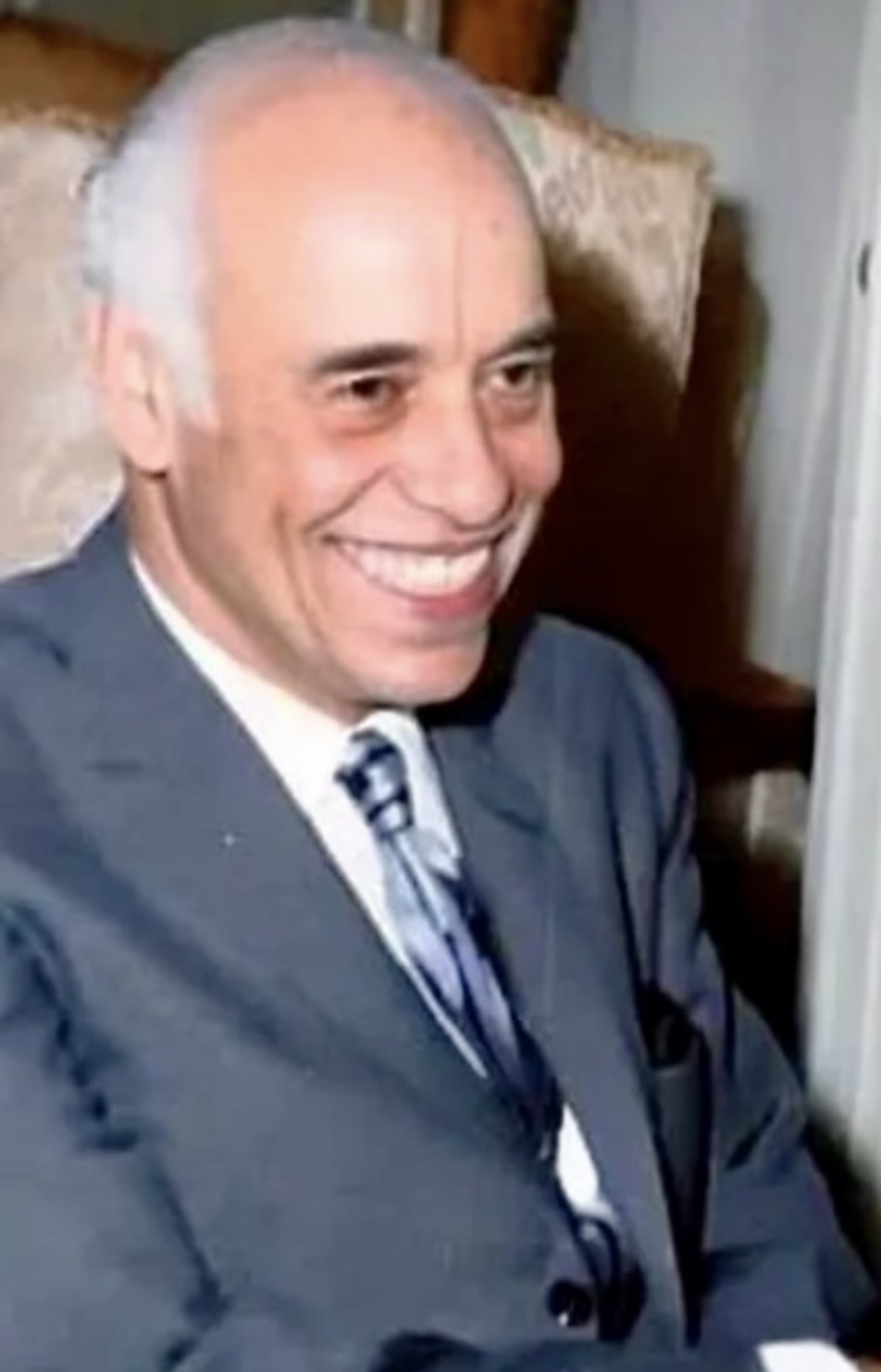
- Marei in 1972

5th Speaker of the People's Assembly of Egypt
- In office 22 October 1974 – 3 November 1978
- Appointed by: People's Assembly
- President: Anwar Sadat
- Preceded by: Hafez Badawy
- Succeeded by: Sufi Abu Taleb

Personal details
- Born: 26 August 1913 Al Aziziyah, Sharqia Governorate, Khedivate of Egypt
- Died: 22 October 1993 (aged 80)
- Party: Saadist Institutional Party; Arab Socialist Union
- Education: Cairo University
- Awards: Order of the Republic

Sayed Marei (Egyptian Arabic: سيد مرعي; 26 August 1913 – 22 October 1993), was an Egyptian politician who held various posts during the presidency of Gamal Abdel Nasser and Anwar Sadat. He is one of the officials who shaped the agrarian activities in Egypt during the 1950s and 1960s.

== Early life and education ==
Marei was born in a village, Al Aziziyah, in Sharqia Governorate on 26 August 1913. His ancestors were from Najd, Arabia, and his grandfather, Nasr Ibrahim Nasr, was a landowner. His father was Ahmad Marei, and the family moved to Cairo in 1919. Ahmed Marei was a member of the Wafd Party and was elected to the Parliament in 1924 and in 1938.

Marei graduated from the College of Agriculture of Cairo University in 1937 obtaining a degree in agricultural engineering.

== Career and activities ==
Following his graduation Marei worked at family farm in Al Aziziyah. He joined the Saadist Institutional Party. He was elected as a member of Parliament in 1942 becoming the youngest parliamentarian in the country.

Following the regime change in 1952 Marei was named as the managing director of the Supreme Committee for Agrarian Reform. Therefore, he was in charge of drafting and executing the law on agricultural reforms. He became the chairman of the board of directors of the Agricultural Credit Bank in March 1955. His first ministerial post was the minister of state for agrarian reform to which he was appointed on 1 July 1956 in a cabinet reshuffle. The office was a new addition to the Egyptian cabinet. He was made the minister of agrarian reform in 1957. The ministry was named as the ministry of central agrarian reform in 1958, and Marei continued to head it. He became the minister of agriculture in 1961. He was removed from the post the same year due to the unsuccessful attempts of the ministry to overcome the cotton worm disaster.

Marei served as the vice president of the Parliament in the early 1960s. He was a member of the Arab Socialist Union and became part of its secretariat in November 1964. He was appointed minister of land reclamation in August 1967 succeeding Abdel Mohsen Abu Al Nour in the post. Marei was in office until March 1968, and Mohamed Bakr Ahmed replaced him in the post. However, Marei was reappointed the minister of agriculture in May 1968 when President Gamal Abdel Nasser reshuffled the cabinet.

Marei was appointed deputy prime minister for agriculture and irrigation in November 1970. He was named as the secretary general of the Arab Socialist Union on 16 January 1972 replacing Mohammed Abdul Salem Al Zayyat in the post. With this appointment Marei left his deputy premiership. He became an advisor to the President Anwar Sadat in April 1973.

Marei was elected as the Speaker of the House in 1974, replacing Hafiz Badawy in the post. He also served as the secretary general of the World Food Conference held in Rome, Italy, in November 1974. Marei's term as speaker of the Parliament ended in October 1978, and he was succeeded by Sufi Abu Taleb in the post. Then Marei was again named as the advisor to the President Anwar Sadat. He was one of the political figures of the Sadat era who developed economic policy of the country. He adopted a politically liberal and socially conservative leaning during this period.

Marei resigned from his post of the presidential advisor in 1981 shortly after the assassination of Anwar Sadat and the election of Hosni Mobarak as president.

== Personal life and death ==
Marei married a daughter of his father's nephew. They had five children. Marei and his wife were related to Zakaria Mohieddin, a member of the Free Officers Movement, who married one of their cousins. Marei's youngest son, Hassan, married Noha Sadat, daughter of Anwar Sadat, in Alexandria on 7 July 1974.

Marei was among the Egyptian officials who were wounded in the attack on 6 October 1981 when the President Anwar Sadat was killed in a military parade in Cairo. Marei died on 22 October 1993.

=== Awards ===
Marei was awarded by the University of Washington an honorary doctorate in 1960. He was also awarded a Syrian medal in 1958 and the Grand Cross of Greece. He was the recipient of the Order of the Republic (1980).

=== Legacy ===
Robert Springborg, a faculty member of the Naval Postgraduate School in Monterey, California, published a book on Sayed Marei in 1982. It is entitled Family, Power, and Politics in Egypt. Sayed Bey Marei-His Clan, Clients, and Cohorts.
