= Mustafa Fahmi =

Egyptian military officer and politician (1840–1914)

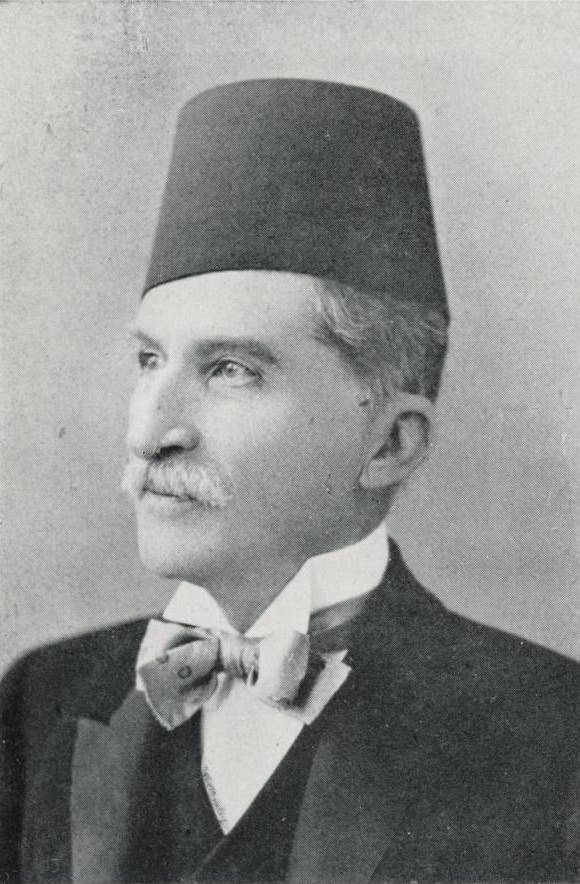
- Fahmy in 1906

Prime Minister of Egypt
- In office 12 November 1895 – 12 November 1908
- Monarch: Abbas II
- Preceded by: Nubar Pasha
- Succeeded by: Boutros Ghali
- In office 12 May 1891 – 15 January 1893
- Monarchs: Tewfik Pasha; Abbas II
- Preceded by: Riaz Pasha
- Succeeded by: Hussein Fahri Pasha

Personal details
- Born: 11 June 1840; Crete, Ottoman Empire
- Died: 13 September 1914 (aged 74); Cairo, Sultanate of Egypt

Military service
- Rank: Lieutenant general

Mustafa Fahmi Pasha (Arabic: مصطفى فهمي باشا; 11 June 1840 – 13 September 1914) was an Egyptian military officer and politician who served as the prime minister of Egypt for two times.

== Early life and education ==
Born in Crete in 1840 to a Turkish family who had earlier settled in Algeria, Fahmi's father was a colonel. Fahmi graduated from the military academy.

== Career ==
After graduation, Fahmi joined the Egyptian army and later, he became a lieutenant general. He retired from the army and began to serve as a governor in different provinces, including Minuffiyya, Cairo and lastly, Port Said. After serving in other low-profile public positions, he was appointed minister of public works in 1879. Then Fahmi served at different cabinet positions: minister of foreign affairs, minister of justice, minister of finance (1884-1887), minister of interior (three times) and minister of war and marine (two times).

Fahmi was appointed prime minister on 12 May 1891, replacing Riaz Pasha in the post. Fahmi remained in office for nearly two years and was sacked by Khedive Abbas II on 15 January 1893. The Khedive dismissed him due to his over reliance on the British agency. Hussein Fahri Pasha replaced Fahmi Pasha as prime minister.

Fahmi's second term as prime minister began on 12 November 1895, and he replaced Nubar Pasha in the post. Fahmi remained in the office until 12 November 1908 when he resigned from the post. Boutros Ghali replaced him as prime minister.

== Personal life and death ==
Fahmi was among the close allies of Cromer who was the British colonial administrator in Egypt. Fahmi's daughter, Safiya, was a political activist and a significant figure in the Egyptian society. She married Saad Zaghlul in 1896.

Fahmi died in Cairo on 13 September 1914.

Political offices
Preceded by Riaz Pasha	Prime Minister of Egypt; 1891–1893	Succeeded by Hussein Fakhry Pasha
Preceded by Nubar Pasha	Prime Minister of Egypt; 1895–1908	Succeeded by Boutros Ghali
