= Boutros Ghali =

Prime Minister of Egypt (1908–1910)

- Ⲡⲉⲧⲣⲟⲥ Ⲅⲁⲗⲓ بطرس غالى
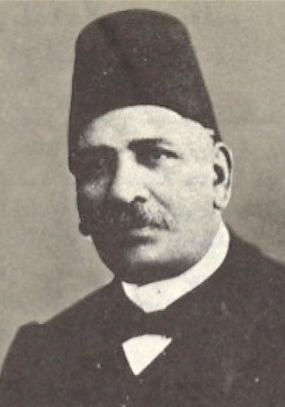

9th Prime Minister of Egypt
- In office 12 November 1908 – 21 February 1910
- Monarch: Abbas II
- Preceded by: Mustafa Fahmi Pasha
- Succeeded by: Muhammad Said Pasha

Personal details
- Born: 12 May 1846 Kiman-al-'Arus, Beni Suef, Eyalet of Egypt
- Died: 21 February 1910 (aged 63) Cairo, Khedivate of Egypt
- Relations: Boutros Boutros-Ghali (Grandson)

Boutros Ghali (12 May 1846 – 21 February 1910; Coptic: Ⲡⲉⲧⲣⲟⲥ Ⲅⲁⲗⲓ, Arabic: بطرس غالى; styled Boutros Ghali Bey later Boutros Ghali Pasha) was an Egyptian politician, who served as the Prime Minister of Egypt from 1908 to 1910.

== Early life ==
Boutros Ghali was born on 12 May 1846 to a Coptic Christian family in Kiman-al-'Arus, a village of Beni Suef, Egypt, in 1846. His father was Ghali Nayruz, the steward of Prince Mustafa Fadil. Boutros Ghali studied Arabic, Ottoman Turkish, Persian, English, and French.

== Career ==
After graduation, Ghali became a teacher at the patriarchal school. Ghali's public career began in 1875 with his appointment to the post of clerk in the newly constituted Mixed Court by Sharif Pasha. Next he became the representative of the Egyptian government on the Commission of the Public Debt. Ghali began to work in the justice ministry in 1879 and was appointed secretary general of the ministry with the title of Bey. His following post was as first secretary of the council of ministers to which he was appointed in September 1881. However, in October 1881 he again began to work in the justice ministry. Upon the request of Mahmoud Sami al-Barudi, Ghali was awarded the rank of Pasha, being the first Coptic recipient of such an honour in Egypt. In 1886, he was appointed head of a commission for the selection of Sharia court judges, which was an unusual appointment due to his religious background, leading to protests by Muslims.

Ghali's first ministerial portfolio was the minister of finance in 1893. Then he was made foreign minister in 1894.

In 1901 he was decorated as the 650th Grand-Cross of the Royal Military Order of Our Lady of the Concepcion of Vila Viçosa of Portugal. The same year Ghali joined the freemason lodge of Egypt.

He was appointed prime minister on 12 November 1908, replacing Mustafa Fahmi Pasha after Fahmi's resignation. He also retained the post of foreign minister during his premiership. Ghali died in office on 21 February 1910 and was replaced by Muhammad Said Pasha.

== Death ==
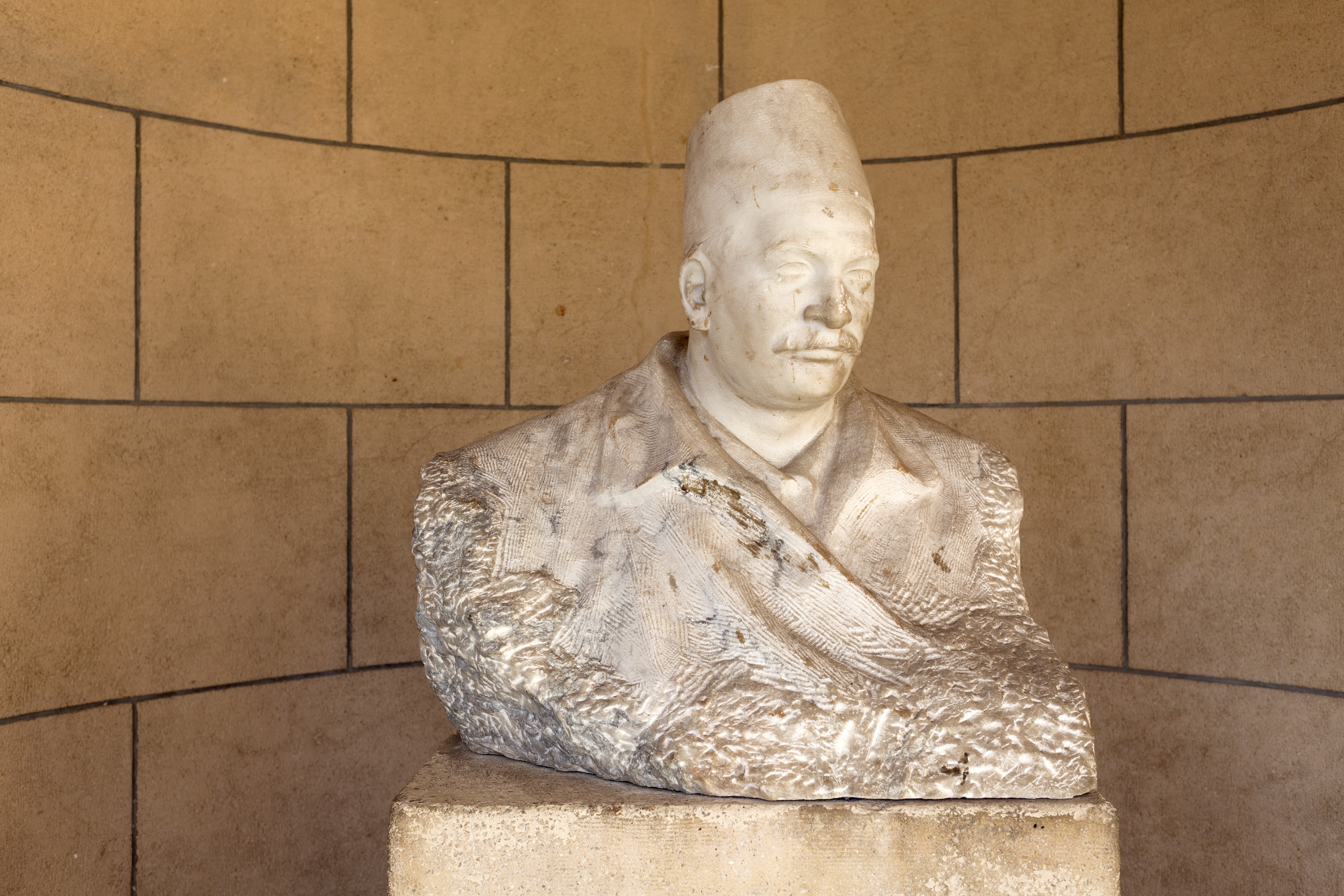
Bust of Boutros Ghali, Church of SS Peter and Paul (Boutrosiya, Cairo)

Ghali was accused of favouring the British in the Denshawai incident. On 20 February 1910, Ghali was shot by Ibrahim Nassif al-Wardani, a twenty-three-year-old pharmacology graduate, who had just returned from Britain. Ghali was leaving the ministry of foreign affairs when Wardani fired five shots, three of which lodged in the premier's body. Ghali died a day later, on 21 February.

The assassin, who confessed to the killing of Ghali, had been educated in Lausanne, Paris, and London and was a member of Mustafa Kamil Pasha's Watani Party. His father was a governor and his uncle was a Pasha. Wardani was executed on 28 June 1910.

The assassination of Ghali was the first of a series of assassinations that continued until 1915. It was also the first public assassination of a senior statesman in Egypt in more than a century.

== Family ==
Ghali had "many sons", the most notable being:

- Yusuf Boutros-Ghali, who was
  - father of Boutros Boutros-Ghali, who was named after his grandfather and served as deputy prime minister of Egypt and as United Nations Secretary-General.,
  - grandfather of Teymour Boutros-Ghali, internet entrepreneur, and
  - grandfather of Youssef Boutros Ghali, Minister of Finance from 2004 to 2011;
- Wasif Boutrus Pasha Ghali or Wasif Boutrus Ghali Pasha (1878–1958), legislator and diplomat, foreign minister;
- Najib Boutros-Ghali, agriculture minister in 1921;
- Mirrit Boutros-Ghali, writer, businessman, and lawyer.

Boutros Ghali's brother Amin Ghali (1865–1933) was a public prosecutor; Amin's son Ibrahim Amin Ghali was a diplomat who worked to rehabilitate his uncle's reputation.

== Honors ==
=== Egyptian national honors ===
Ribbon bar	Honor
	Grand Cordon of the Order of Muhammad Ali
	Grand Cordon of the Order of Ismail

=== Foreign honors ===
Ribbon bar	Country	Honor
	Ethiopian Empire	Grand Cordon of the Order of Solomon
	Ottoman Empire	Grand Cordon of the Order of Osmanieh
	Kingdom of Greece	Grand Commander of the Order of the Redeemer
	Kingdom of Italy	Grand Officier of the Order of the Crown of Italy
	United Kingdom	Honorary Knight Commander of the Order of St Michael and St George
	United Kingdom	Honorary Knight Grand Cross of the Royal Victorian Order

== See also ==
- Eldon Gorst

Political offices
Preceded by Mustafa Fahmi Pasha	Prime Minister of Egypt; 1908–1910	Succeeded by Muhammad Said Pasha
