= Nubar Pasha =

Prime Minister of Egypt (1878–1879, 1894–1895)

Nubar Pasha GCSI
- نوبار باشا; Նուպար Փաշա; Nubar Paşa
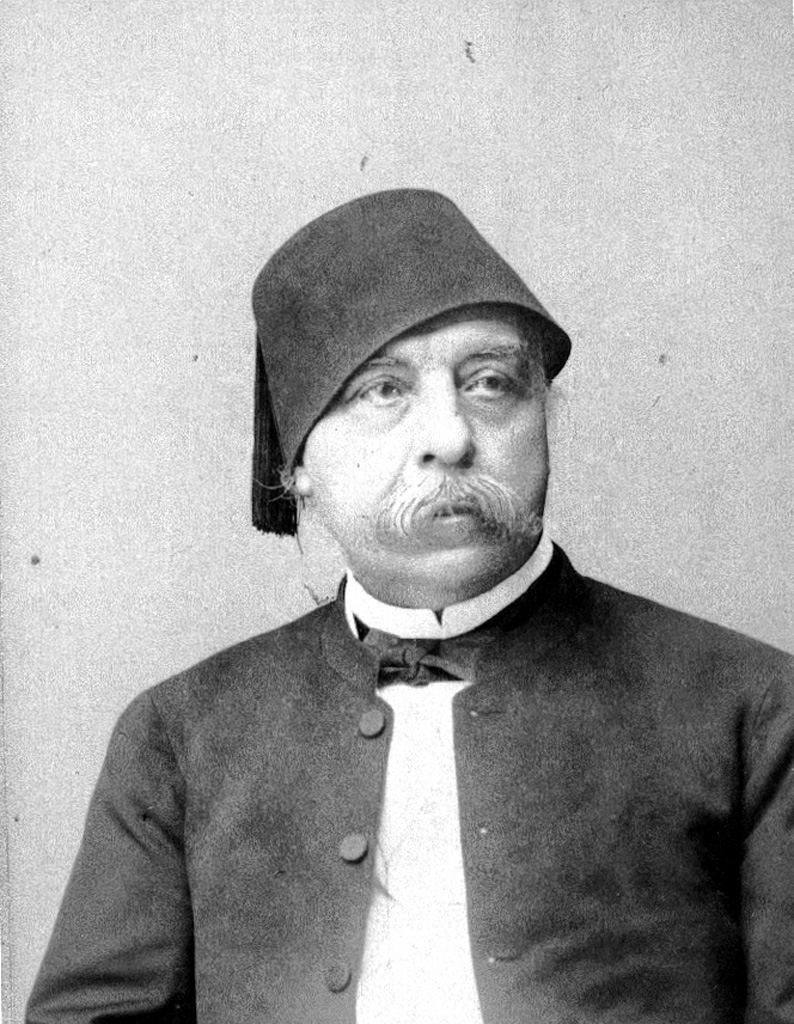
- Nubar Pasha

1st Prime Minister of Egypt
- In office 16 April 1894 – 12 November 1895
- Monarch: Abbas Hilmi Pasha
- Preceded by: Riaz Pasha
- Succeeded by: Mostafa Fahmy Pasha
- In office 10 January 1884 – 9 June 1888
- Monarch: Mohamed Tewfik Pasha
- Preceded by: Mohamed Sherif Pasha
- Succeeded by: Riaz Pasha
- In office 28 August 1878 – 23 February 1879
- Monarch: Isma'il Pasha
- Preceded by: Position Created
- Succeeded by: Isma'il Pasha

Personal details
- Born: January 1825 Smyrna, Ottoman Empire
- Died: 14 January 1899 (aged 74) Paris, France

Nubar Pasha GCSI (Arabic: نوبار باشا; Armenian: Նուպար Փաշա; January 1825 – 14 January 1899) was an Egyptian-Armenian politician and the first Prime Minister of Egypt. He served as Prime Minister three times during his career. His first term was between August 1878 and 23 February 1879. His second term was served from 10 January 1884 to 9 June 1888. His final term was between 16 April 1894 and 12 November 1895.

== Early life ==
Nubar was born Nubar Nubarian (Armenian: Նուպար Նուպարեան) in Smyrna (modern day İzmir) in January 1825, the son of a Christian Armenian merchant named Mgrdich, who had married a relative of Boghos Bey Yusufian, an influential minister of Muhammad Ali. Boghos Bey had promised to interest himself in the future of his young relative, and at his suggestion he was sent first to Vevey, and then to Toulouse, to be educated by the Jesuits, from whom he learnt the French language.

== Khedival Secretary: 1843-1863 ==
Before he was 18 he went to Egypt, and after 18 months training as secretary to Boghos Bey, who was then minister of both commerce and foreign affairs, he was made second secretary to Muhammad Ali. In 1845 he became first secretary to Ibrahim Pasha, the heir apparent, and accompanied him on a special mission to Europe.

Abbas Pasha, who succeeded Ibrahim as Viceroy in 1848, maintained Nubar in the same capacity, and sent him in 1850 to London as his representative to oppose the pretensions of the Ottoman sultan, who was seeking to evade the conditions of the treaty under which Egypt was secured to the family of Muhammad Ali. After his success in London, he was made a bey; in 1853 he was sent to Vienna on a similar mission, and remained there until the death of Abbas in July 1854.

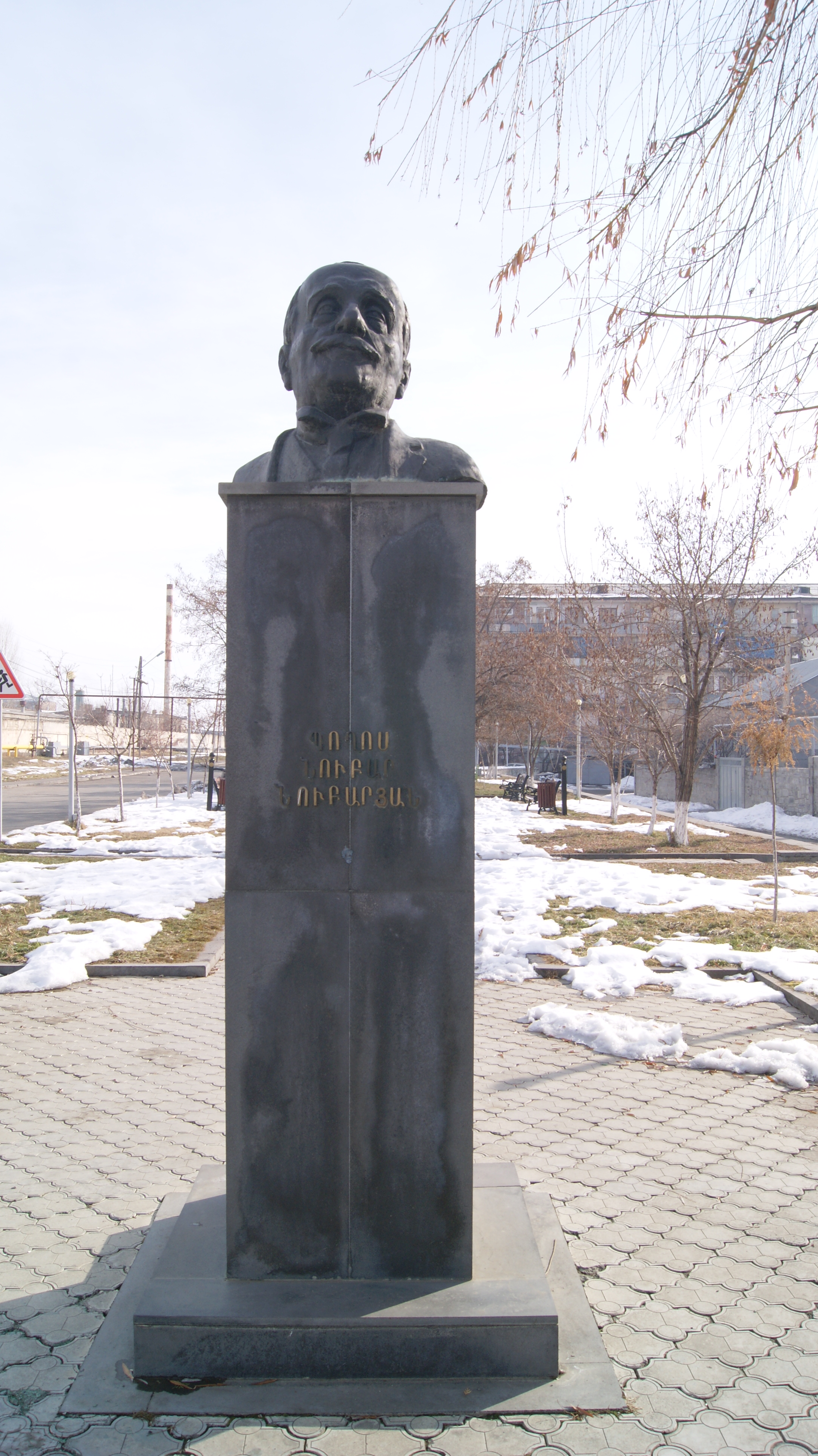
Nubar Pasha's bust in Nubarashen district of Yerevan

The new viceroy, Said, immediately dismissed him from office, but two years afterwards appointed him as his chief secretary, and later put him in charge of the important transport service through Egypt to India. Here Nubar was instrumental in the completion of railway communication between Cairo and Suez, and reportedly showed strong organising ability combined with readiness of resource. After again being dismissed by Said's, he was again sent to Vienna, and returned as principal secretary to Said, a position he held until Said's death in January 1863.

When Ismail Pasha ascended, Nubar was already on friendly terms with him; he even claimed to have saved his life. After the two decided not to take a train on 14 May 1858 which resulted in a crash and the death of the prince Ahmed, who would otherwise have succeeded Said. Ismail, himself a reportedly more capable man than his immediate predecessors, charged Nubar with a mission to Constantinople, not only to notify his accession, but to smooth the way for the many ambitious projects he already entertained, notably the completion of the Suez Canal, the change in title to that of khedive and the change in the order of succession.

In the first of these he was completely successful; the sultan, who did not think the project would succeed, gave his consent at a price the moderation. The pleased Ismail created Nubar a pasha, and the sultan himself, persuaded to visit Cairo, confirmed the title rarely given to a Christian. Nubar was then sent to Paris to complete the arrangements, and to settle the differences between Egypt and the Canal Company. He left these differences to the arbitration of the emperor Napoleon III and cost Egypt four million pounds sterling.

== Cabinet Minister: 1864-1878 ==
On his return he was made Egypt's first minister of public works, and was notable for the energy which he put into the creation of a new department; but in 1866 he was made minister of foreign affairs, and immediately went on a special mission to Constantinople, where he succeeded in the other two projects that had been left in suspension since his last visit.

In June 1867 Ismail was declared Khedive of Egypt, with succession in favor of his eldest son. The system of capitulations which had existed in the Ottoman Empire since the 15th century had grown in Egypt to be a practical creation of 17 imperia in imperio: 17 consulates of 17 different foreign powers administered 17 different codes in courts before which only affected their subjects. A plaintiff could only sue a Frenchman in the French court, with appeal to Aix-en-Provence; an Italian in the Italian court, with appeal to Ancona; a Russian in the Russian court, with appeal to Moscow. Nubar's new design, was to induce these 17 powers to consent to abandon their jurisdiction in Egyptian civil actions, to substitute mixed International Courts and a uniform code binding on all. Nubar made no attempt to get rid of the criminal jurisdiction exercised by the consular representatives of the foreign powers — such a proposal would have had, at that time, little chance of success.

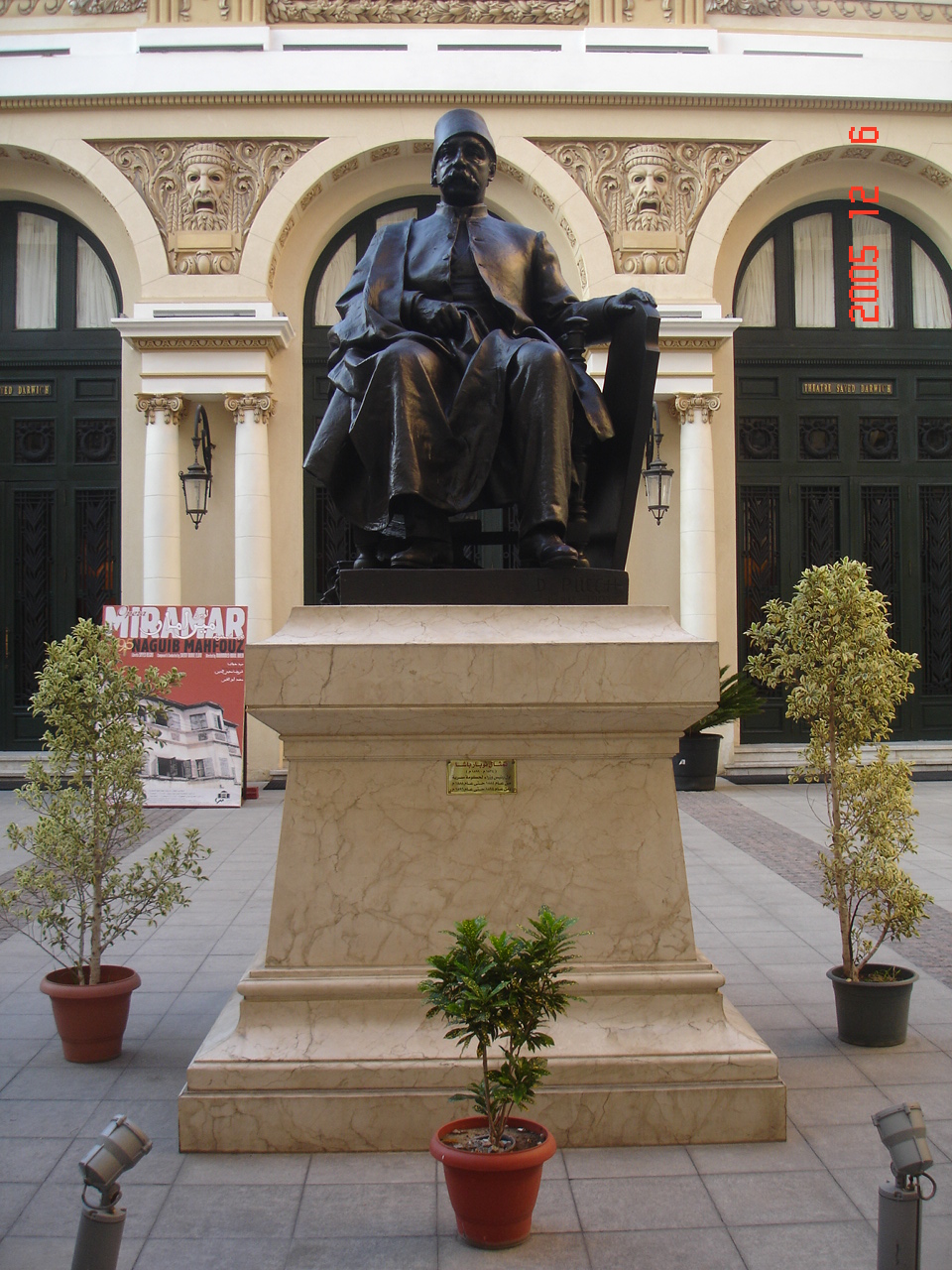
A statue of Nubar Pasha at the entrance of Alexandria Opera House.

== Prime Minister: 1878-1879 ==
The extravagant administration of Ismail had brought Egypt to the verge of bankruptcy, and Ismail's disregard of the judgments of the Court had compelled Great Britain and France to interfere. Under pressure, Ismail, assented to a mixed ministry with Nubar as prime minister, with Charles Rivers Wilson as minister of finance and the Marquis de Blignières as minister of public works. Nubar, finding himself supported by both Great Britain and France, tried to reduce Ismail to the position of a constitutional monarch, and Ismail, took advantage of the disbandment of certain regiments to incite a military rebellion against the ministry. The governments of Great Britain and France, instead of supporting the ministry against the khedive, weakly consented to Nubar's dismissal; but when this was shortly followed by that of Rivers Wilson and de Blignières they realized that the situation was a critical one, and they succeeded in obtaining from the sultan the deposition of Ismail and the substitution of his son Tawfiq as khedive in 1879. Nubar remained out of office until 1884.

== Prime Minister: 1884 - 1888 ==
Since he left office, Great Britain had intervened in Egypt — the battle of Tel al-Kebir had been fought, Urabi Pasha had been banished, and Sir Evelyn Baring (afterwards Lord Cromer) had succeeded Sir Edward Baldwin Malet. The British government, under the advice of Baring, insisted on the evacuation of Sudan, and Muhammad Sharif Pasha having resigned office, Nubar was induced to become prime minister, and to carry out a policy which he openly disapproved, but which he considered Egypt was forced to accept under British dictation. At this period he reportedly said, "I am not here to govern Egypt, but to administer the British government of Egypt. I am simply the greaser of the official wheels."

In June 1888 that he was dismissed from office, though his dismissal was the direct act of the khedive Tawfiq, who did not on this occasion seek the advice of the British agent.

== Prime Minister: 1894-1895 ==
Riyad Pasha, who succeeded him, was prime minister for eight months until April 1894, when Nubar returned to office. By that time Lord Cromer had more control of administration as well as of government, and Nubar had realized more clearly the role which an Egyptian minister was meant on to play: Lord Cromer was the real ruler of Egypt, and the death of Tawfiq in 1892 had necessitated a more open exercise of British authority.

In November 1895 Nubar complete fifty years of service, and, accepting a pension, retired from office. He lived little more than three years longer, spending his time between Cairo and Paris, where he died in January 1899.

== Legacy ==
Nubarashen, a suburb of Yerevan, was founded in 1930 with the help of Boghos Nubar, Nubar Pasha's son, and is named after Nubar Pasha.

== See also ==
- Armenians in Egypt

Political offices
Preceded by (none)	Prime Minister of Egypt; 1878–1879	Succeeded by Mohamed Tewfik Pasha
Preceded by Mohamed Sherif Pasha	Prime Minister of Egypt; 1884–1888	Succeeded by Riaz Pasha
Preceded by Riaz Pasha	Prime Minister of Egypt; 1894–1895	Succeeded by Mostafa Fahmy Pasha
