= History of the Arab–Israeli conflict =

The Arab–Israeli conflict began in the 20th century, evolving from earlier Intercommunal violence in Mandatory Palestine. The conflict became a major international issue with the birth of Israel in 1948. The Arab–Israeli conflict has resulted in at least five major wars and a number of minor conflicts. It has also been the source of two major Palestinian uprisings (intifadas).

== Background ==
=== Ottoman era ===
Tensions between the Zionist movements and the Arab residents of Palestine started to emerge after the 1880s, when immigration of European Jews to Palestine increased. This immigration increased the Jewish communities in Ottoman Palestine by the acquisition of land from Ottoman and individual Arab landholders, known as effendis, and establishment of Jewish agricultural settlements (kibbutzim). At the time, Arabs lived in an almost feudal existence on the effendis' land. Demographer Justin McCarthy estimated from Ottoman census data that the population of Palestine in 1882–3 was about 468,000, consisting of 408,000 Muslims, 44,000 Christians and 15,000 Jews. By the eve of World War I, these numbers had increased to 602,000 Muslims, 81,000 Christians and 39,000 Jews, plus a similar but uncertain number of Jews who were not Ottoman citizens. The first Statistician General of Israel, Roberto Bachi, give similar numbers except for a lower count (525,000) of Muslims in 1914.

=== British Mandate (1920–1948) ===
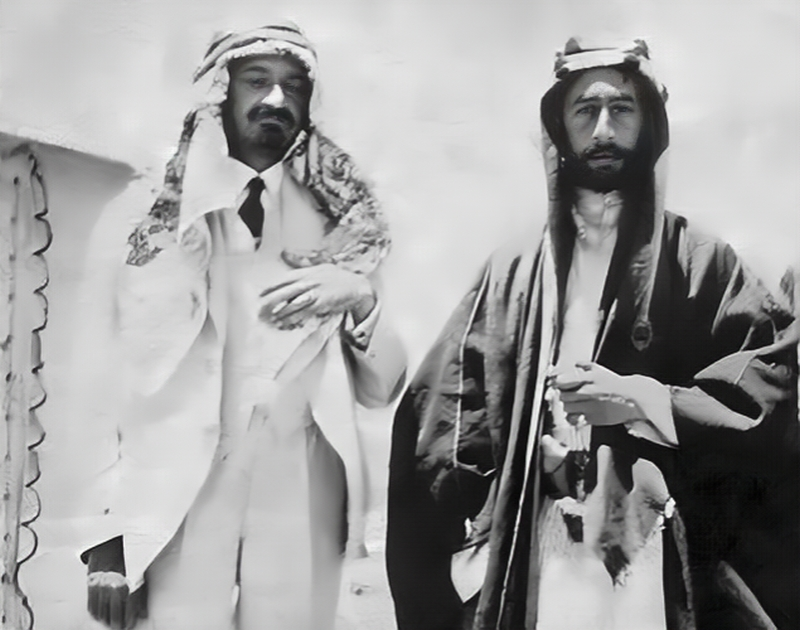
1918. Emir Faisal and Chaim Weizmann (left, also wearing Arab outfit)

During the time of the Mandatory Palestine, the Balfour Declaration signed in 1917, stated that the government of Great Britain supported the establishment of a "Jewish national home" in Palestine. This exacerbated tensions between the Arabs living in Mandate Palestine and the Jews who emigrated there during the Ottoman period. Signed in January 1919, the Faisal–Weizmann Agreement promoted Arab-Jewish cooperation on the development of a Jewish national homeland in Palestine and an Arab nation in a large part of the Middle East, though this event had little to no effect on the conflict.

In 1920, the San Remo conference largely endorsed the 1916 Anglo-French Sykes–Picot Agreement, allocating to Britain the area of present-day Jordan, the area between the Jordan River and the Mediterranean Sea, and Iraq, while France received Syria and Lebanon. In 1922, the League of Nations formally established the British Mandate for Palestine and Transjordan, at least partially fulfilling Britain's commitments from the 1915–16 McMahon–Hussein Correspondence by assigning all of the land east of the Jordan River to the Emirate of Jordan, ruled by Hashemite king Abdullah but closely dependent on Britain, leaving the remainder west of the Jordan as the League of Nations Mandatory Palestine. While the British had made promises to give both Arabs and Jews land, the British claimed they had never promised to give either side all of the land. Rising tensions had given way to violence, such as the 1920 Nebi Musa riots, and Jaffa riots of 1921. To assuage the Arabs, and due to British inability to control Arab violence in the Mandatory Palestine any other way, the semi-autonomous Arab Emirate of Transjordan was created in all Palestinian territory east of the Jordan river (roughly 77% of the mandate).

The conflicting forces of Arab nationalism and the Zionist movement created a situation which the British could neither resolve nor extricate themselves from. Pogroms in Russia and Ukraine as well as Adolf Hitler's rise to power in Germany created a new urgency in the Zionist movement to create a Jewish state, and the evident intentions of the Zionists provoked increasingly fierce Arab attacks against the Jewish population (most notably in the preceding 1929 Hebron massacre, the activities of the Black Hand, and during the 1936–39 Arab revolt in Palestine). The British-appointed Grand Mufti of Jerusalem, Haj Amin al-Husseini, led opposition to the idea of turning part of Palestine into a Jewish state.

In seeking support against British rule in Palestine, the Grand Mufti sought alliance with the Axis powers; Britain responded by banishing the Mufti (who spent much of World War II in Germany and helped form a Muslim SS division in the Balkans), curbing Jewish immigration, and reinforce its police force. The Jewish leadership (Yishuv) adopted a policy of restraint and defensive action while criticizing Britain for its conciliation of Arab violence and revising its commitments under the Balfour Declaration. Dissatisfaction with this approach led some members to split from the Haganah and form the Irgun, a more militant underground group later led by Menachem Begin.

A British Royal Commission of Inquiry that came to be known as the Peel Commission was established in 1936. In its 1937 report, it proposed a two-state solution that gave the Arabs control over all of the Negev, much of the present-day West Bank, and Gaza and gave the Jews control over Tel Aviv, Haifa, present-day northern Israel, and surrounding areas. The British were to maintain control over Jaffa, Jerusalem, Bethlehem, and surrounding areas. The two main Jewish leaders, Chaim Weizmann and David Ben-Gurion had convinced the Zionist Congress to approve equivocally the Peel recommendations as a basis for more negotiation. The Arabs, however, rejected it while demanding cessation of immigration and land sales to Jewish people. The Arabs' demands prompted the British to stop Jewish immigration, thus preventing refugees from escaping the Holocaust.

Jewish violence against the Mandatory Palestine continued to mount throughout the later half of the 1940s, with attacks by the Irgun, assassination of British authorities officials by the Lehi, and the 1946 King David Hotel bombing.

In 1947, the population was reported as 1,845,000, consisting of 608,000 Jews and 1,237,000 Arabs and others.

== War of 1948 ==
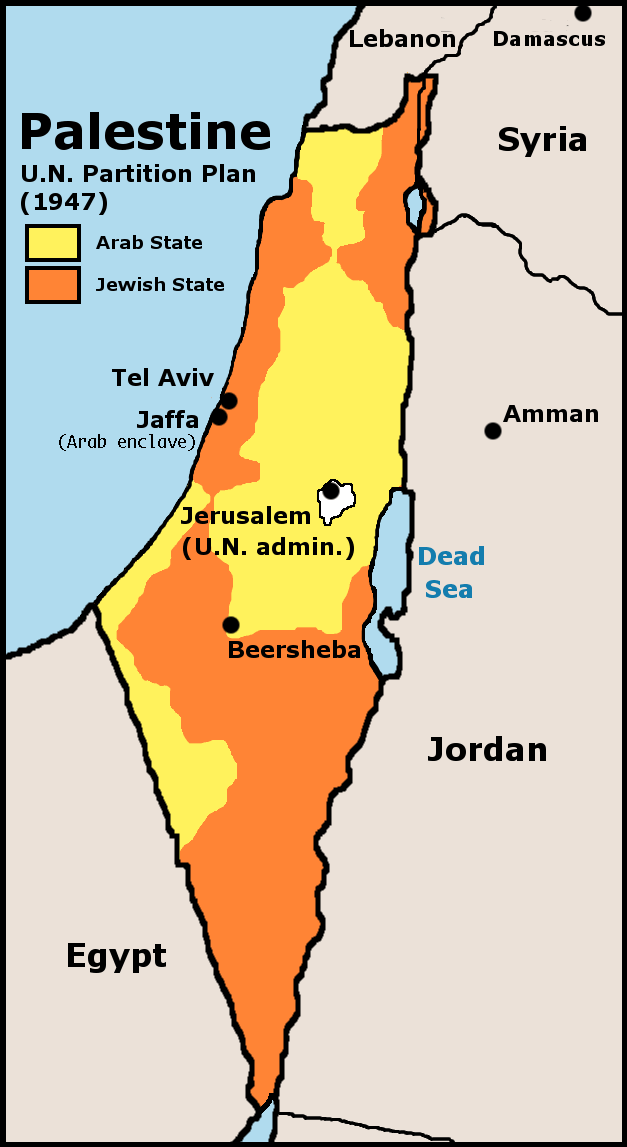
The UN Partition Plan offered to both sides of the conflict before the 1948 war. The Jews accepted the plan while the Arabs rejected it.

The 1948 Arab–Israeli War (1948–49), known as the "War of Independence" by Israelis and al-Nakba ("the Catastrophe") by Palestinians, began after the UN Partition Plan and the subsequent 1947–48 Civil War in Mandatory Palestine in November 1947. The plan proposed the establishment of Arab and Jewish states in Palestine. The Arabs had rejected the plan while the Jews had accepted it. For four months, under continuous Arab provocation and attack, the Yishuv was usually on the defensive while occasionally retaliating. By March 1948 however, the United States was actively seeking a temporary UN approved trusteeship rather than immediate partition, known as the Truman trusteeship proposal. The Jewish leadership rejected this. By now, both Jewish and Arab militias had begun campaigns to control territory inside and outside the designated borders, and an open war between the two populations emerged.

Jordanian, Egyptian, Syrian, Lebanese, Iraqi and Saudi troops invaded Palestine subsequent to the British withdrawal and the declaration of the State of Israel on May 14, 1948. The Arab invasion was denounced by the United States, the Soviet Union, and UN secretary-general Trygve Lie, although it found support from Taiwan and other UN member states. The Arab states proclaimed their aim of a "United State of Palestine" in place of Israel and an Arab state. The Arab Higher Committee said, that in the future Palestine, the Jews will be no more than 1/7 of the population. i.e. only Jews that lived in Palestine before the British mandate. They did not specify what will happen to the other Jews. They considered the UN Plan to be invalid because it was opposed by Palestine's Arab majority, and claimed that the British withdrawal led to an absence of legal authority, making it necessary for them to protect Arab lives and property. About two thirds of Palestinian Arabs fled or were expelled from the territories which came under Jewish control; the rest became Arab citizens of Israel. All of the much smaller number of Jews in the territories captured by the Arabs, for example the Old City of Jerusalem, also fled or were expelled. The official United Nations estimate was that 711,000 Arabs became refugees during the fighting.

May 15 – June 10

The fighting ended with signing of the several Armistice Agreements in 1949 between Israel and its warring neighbors (Egypt, Lebanon, Jordan, and Syria), which formalized Israeli control of the area allotted to the Jewish state plus just over half of the area allotted to the Arab state. The Gaza Strip was occupied by Egypt and the West Bank by Jordan until June 1967 when they were occupied by Israel during the Six-Day War.

=== Aftermath of the 1948 war ===
Boundaries defined in the 1947 UN Partition Plan for Palestine: Area assigned for a Jewish state Area assigned for an Arab state Planned Corpus separatum with the intention that Jerusalem would be neither Jewish nor Arab Armistice Demarcation Lines of 1949 (Green Line): Israel per 1949 armistice lines West Jerusalem and other areas under Israeli control from 1949 Gaza and the West Bank (including East Jerusalem) under Egyptian and Jordanian control till 1967

The about 711,000 Palestinians who fled or were expelled from the areas that became Israel were not allowed to return to their homes, and took up residence in refugee camps in surrounding countries, including Lebanon, Jordan, Syria, and the area that was later to be known as the Gaza Strip; they were usually not allowed to leave refugee camps and mix with the local Arab society either, leaving the Palestinian refugee problem unsolved even today. Around 400 Arab towns and villages were depopulated during the 1948 Palestinian exodus. The United Nations Relief and Works Agency for Palestine Refugees in the Near East was established to alleviate their condition.

After the war, "[t]he Arab states insisted on two main demands", neither of which were accepted by Israel: 1. Israel should withdraw to the borders of the UN Partition Plan – Israel argued "that the new borders—which could be changed, under consent only—had been established as a result of war, and because the UN blueprint took no account of defense needs and was militarily untenable, there was no going back to that blueprint." 2. The Palestinian refugees deserved a full right of return to Israel – Israel argued that this was "out of the question, not only because they were hostile to the Jewish state, but they would also fundamentally alter the Jewish character of the state."

Over the next two decades after the 1948 war ended, between 700,000 and 900,000 Jews fled or were expelled from the Arab countries they were living in, in many cases owing to anti-Jewish sentiment, expulsion (in the case of Egypt), or, in the case of Iraq, legal oppression but also quite often to promises of a better life from Israel; of this number, two-thirds ended up in refugee camps in Israel, while the remainder migrated to France, the United States and other Western or Latin American countries. The Jewish refugee camps in Israel were evacuated with time and the refugees were eventually integrated in the Jewish Israeli society (which in fact consisted almost entirely of refugees from Arab and European states). Israel argued that this and the Palestinian exodus represented a population exchange between Arab nations and the Jewish nation.

For the 19 years from the end of the Mandate until the Six-Day War, Jordan controlled the West Bank and Egypt controlled the Gaza Strip. In 1950, Jordan annexed the West Bank, but this annexation was recognized only by the United Kingdom. Both territories were conquered (but not annexed) from Jordan and Egypt by Israel in the Six-Day War. Neither Jordan nor Egypt allowed the creation of a Palestinian state in these territories. The effect this had on Israel during this period "were frequent border clashes ... terror and sabotage acts by individuals and small groups of Palestinian Arabs."

== War of 1956 ==
The 1956 Suez War was a joint Israeli-British-French operation, in which Israel invaded the Sinai Peninsula and British and French forces landed at the port of Suez, ostensibly to separate the warring parties, though the real motivation of Great Britain and France was to protect the interests of investors in those countries who were affected by Egyptian President Nasser's decision to nationalize the Suez Canal. Israel justified its invasion of Egypt as an attempt to stop attacks (see the Fedayeen) upon Israeli civilians, and to restore Israeli shipping rights through the Straits of Tiran, which Egypt claimed was within its territorial waters. The invading forces agreed to withdraw under U.S. and international pressure, and Israel withdrew from the Sinai as well, in return for the installation of United Nations Emergency Forces and guarantees of Israeli freedom of shipment. The canal was left in Egyptian (rather than British and French) hands.

== Between 1956 and 1967 ==
This period saw the rise of Nasserism; the founding of the United Arab Republic in 1958 and its collapse in 1961; Syrian plans for the diversion of water from the Jordan River; continued fedayeen raids, mostly from Syria and Jordan, and Israeli reprisals; and the increasing alignment of the Arab states with the Soviet Union, who became their largest arms supplier.

In 1964, the PLO was established by mostly Palestinian refugees mostly from Jordan. The Article 24 of the Palestinian National Charter of 1964 stated: "This Organization does not exercise any territorial sovereignty over the West Bank in the Hashemite Kingdom of Jordan, on the Gaza Strip or in the Himmah Area."

== War of 1967 ==
The background from which erupted the Six-Day War was caused by an erroneous information given to Nasser from the Soviet intelligence services that Israel was amassing troops near the Israeli-Syrian border. The state of conflict was also very tense after increased conflicts between Israel and Syria and Israel and Jordan – i.e. the Samu Incident. On 14 May 1967 Mohamed Fawzi (general) left for Syria for one day tour, verified that the Soviet report was false and reported that there were no Israeli armed forces near the Syrian border. Still, Nasser declared full mobilisation in Egypt as of 14 May 1967, citing the joint defence agreement with Syria. The Egyptian further steps were stationing of 100,000 Egyptian troops at the Sinai Peninsula, expulsion of UNEF peacekeeping forces (UNEF II) from the Sinai Peninsula along the border with Israel, and closure of the Straits of Tiran on May 21–22, 1967 (thus "blocking all shipping to and from Eilat ... a casus belli" according to a possible interpretation of international law). The Israeli army had a potential strength, including the not fully mobilized reserves, of 264,000 troops.

Following the breakdown of international diplomatic efforts to solve the crisis, the fighting in the Six-Day War of 1967 began on 6 June 1967 with surprise Israeli air strikes that destroyed the entire Egyptian air force while it was still on the ground. In spite of Israel's request to Jordan to desist from attacking it, Jordan along with Syria began to shell Israeli targets. In addition, Hussein, reluctant at first, sent ineffective bomber strikes because of Nasser's requests and affirmation of a sound Egyptian victory. Attacks on other Arab air forces took place later in the day as hostilities broke out on other fronts. A subsequent ground invasion into Egyptian territory led to Israel's conquest of the Gaza Strip and the Sinai Peninsula. With the rapid and rather unexpected success on the Egyptian front, Israel decided to attack and successfully captured the West Bank from Jordan on June 7, and the Golan Heights from Syria on June 9.

=== Khartoum Resolution, UN Resolution 242, and peace proposals ===
The Khartoum Resolution of September 1, 1967, was issued at the conclusion of 1967 Arab League summit convened in the wake of the Six-Day War, in Khartoum, the capital of Sudan. The resolution ended the Arab oil boycott declared during the Six-Day War, and called for the establishment of the Kuwaiti-led Arab Fund for Economic and Social Development. On the conflict with Israel, it said:

"The Arab Heads of State have agreed to unite their political efforts at the international and diplomatic level to eliminate the effects of the aggression and to ensure the withdrawal of the aggressive Israeli forces from the Arab lands which have been occupied since the aggression of June 5. This will be done within the framework of the main principles by which the Arab States abide, namely, no peace with Israel, no recognition of Israel, no negotiations with it, and insistence on the rights of the Palestinian people in their own country."

Israel and some analysts interpreted the "three noes" of the resolution as a firm proof of Arab intransigence. Others noted that the resolution called for Israeli withdrawal to the pre-1967 lines rather than Israel's destruction and understood the "three noes" as meaning that the Arab states must negotiate as a group and not individually.

Following the Six-Day War, the United Nations Security Council adopted Resolution 242 which proposed a peaceful solution to the Arab-Israeli conflict. The resolution was accepted by Israel, Jordan, and Egypt, but rejected by Syria until 1972–73 and the Yom Kippur War. To this day, Resolution 242 remains controversial due to conflicting interpretations over how much territory Israel would be required to withdraw from in order to conform with the resolution. Also, after the Israeli occupation of the West Bank following the war, Palestinian nationalism substantially increased. Armed resistance was encouraged from within the newly occupied territories and from the Arab nations that lost in the war.

U.S. Secretary of State William P. Rogers proposed the Rogers Plan, which called for a 90-day ceasefire, a military standstill zone on each side of the Suez Canal, and an effort to reach agreement in the framework of UN Resolution 242. The Egyptian government accepted the Rogers Plan even before Anwar Sadat became president. Israel refused to enter negotiations with Egypt based on the Rogers peace plan. Nasser forestalled any movement toward direct negotiations with Israel. In dozens of speeches and statements, Nasser posited the equation that any direct peace talks with Israel were tantamount to surrender. No breakthrough occurred even after President Sadat in 1972 surprised everyone by suddenly expelling Soviet advisers from Egypt and again signaled to the United States government his willingness to negotiate.

== War of 1967–1970 ==
The War of Attrition was a limited war fought between Egypt and Israel from 1967 to 1970. It was initiated by Egypt to damage Israel's morale and economy after its victory in the Six-Day War. The war ended with a ceasefire signed between the countries in 1970 with frontiers at the same place as when the war started.

== War of 1973 ==
When the ceasefire came into effect, Israel had lost ground on the east side of the Suez Canal to Egypt (shown in red) but gained ground west of the canal and in the Golan Heights (shown in gray/brown)

The 1973 Yom Kippur War began when Egypt and Syria launched a surprise joint attack, on the Jewish day of fasting, in the Sinai Peninsula and Golan Heights. The Egyptians and Syrians advanced during the first 24–48 hours, after which momentum began to swing in Israel's favor. By the second week of the war, the Syrians had been pushed entirely out of the Golan Heights. In the Sinai to the south, the Israelis had struck at the "hinge" between two invading Egyptian armies, crossed the Suez Canal (where the old ceasefire line had been), and cut off an entire Egyptian army just as a United Nations ceasefire came into effect. During this time, the United States airlifted military supplies to Israel while the Soviet Union airlifted military supplies to Egypt.

Israeli troops eventually withdrew from the west of the Canal and the Egyptians kept their positions on a narrow strip on the east allowing them to re-open the Suez Canal and claim victory. According to The Continuum Political Encyclopedia of the Middle East (ed. Sela, 2002), Israel clearly had the military victory over both Syria and Egypt, but it suffered a large blow to morale as well as substantial human casualties. The outcome of the Yom Kippur War set the stage for "a new phase in Israeli-Egyptian relations" ending ultimately in the signing of the Camp David Accords.

== South Lebanon ==
=== 1978 conflict ===
Operation Litani was the official name of Israel's 1978 invasion of Lebanon up to the Litani river. The invasion was a military success, as PLO forces were pushed north of the river. However, international outcry led to the creation of the UNIFIL peacekeeping force and a partial Israeli retreat.

=== 1982 Lebanon War ===
The 1982 Lebanon War began when Israel attacked Lebanon, justified by Israel as an attempt to remove the Fatah militants led by Yasser Arafat from Southern Lebanon (where they had established, during the country's civil war, a semi-independent enclave used to launch attacks on Israel). The invasion was widely criticized both in and outside Israel, especially after the Israeli-backed Phalangist Christian militia's Sabra and Shatila massacre, and ultimately led to the death of roughly 1,000 Palestinians. Although through the war, Israel succeeded in exiling the PLO military personnel, including Arafat to Tunisia, it became entangled with various local Muslim militias (particularly Hezbollah), which fought to end the Israeli occupation.

=== 1982–2000 conflict ===
By 1985, Israel retreated from all but a narrow stretch of Lebanese territory designated by Israel as the Israeli Security Zone. UN Security Council Resolution 425 (calling on Israel to completely withdraw from Lebanon) was not completely fulfilled until 16 June 2000. Despite UN Security Council resolutions 1559 and 1583, Hezbollah continues to have a military wing.

== Intifada of 1987–1993 ==
The First Intifada, 1987–1993, began as an uprising of Palestinians, particularly the young, against the Israeli military occupation of the West Bank and Gaza Strip after the failure of the PLO to achieve any kind of meaningful diplomatic solution to the Palestinian issue. The exiled PLO leadership in Tunisia quickly assumed a role in the intifada, but the uprising also brought a rise in the importance of Palestinian national and Islamic movements, and helped lead to the Palestinian Declaration of Independence in 1988. The intifada was started by a group of young Palestinians who began throwing rocks at the Israeli occupying forces in Jabalia (Gaza Strip) in December 1987. In May 1989, the government of Yitzhak Shamir, the prime minister of Israel at the time, "suggested that violence cease, and that elections should be held in the West Bank and Gaza for a political delegation with whom Israel would come to terms regarding the implementation of Palestinian interim self-governing authority in these areas." These elections however never materialized.

During the Gulf War in 1990–1991, Iraq tried to draw Israel into the confrontation by firing rockets at Israel and thereby make it difficult for Arab regimes to remain in the coalition. During the war, the Palestinian Liberation Organization (PLO) and King Hussein of Jordan supported Iraq's invasion of Kuwait, while PLO chairman Yasser Arafat had allegedly received $100 million from Saddam Hussein. However, under strong pressure from the US, which feared direct Israeli involvement would threaten the unity of the coalition, Israel did not retaliate against Iraq and the multinational coalition ousted Iraqi forces from Kuwait. The defeat of Saddam Hussein in the Gulf War "was a devastating blow to ... the Palestinians." After the Gulf War, Kuwaiti authorities forcibly pressured nearly 200,000 Palestinians to leave Kuwait. The policy which partly led to this exodus was a response to the alignment of PLO leader Yasser Arafat with Saddam Hussein. They also withdrew their financial support from the Palestinian cause due to PLO support of Saddam Hussein. It was this political environment that allowed for the PLO to begin talks with the United States and Israel. The First Palestinian Intifada ended with the Madrid Conference of 1991 and the signing of the Oslo Accords by Israel and the PLO in 1993.

== Oslo peace process (1993–2000) ==
In September 1993, Israeli Prime Minister Yitzhak Rabin and PLO Chairman Yasser Arafat signed the Declaration of Principles (DOP) which "shaped the principles for a prospective process of the establishment of a five-year interim self-governing authority" in the Palestinian territories. In May 1994, the first stage of the DOP was implemented, Arafat arrived in the Gaza Strip, and financial aid started pouring in from the parts of the Western world and Japan. Unfortunately, "the new trend in Israeli-Palestinian relations also entailed a wave of violence by religious fanatics." In September 1996, after the opening of some ancient tunnels near the Temple Mount, a small wave of violence occurred. This frightened many Israelis into believing that "the new reality created by the Oslo Agreements, namely the presence of an armed police force of approximately 30,000 Palestinians, ... could easily shift from cooperation to hostility."

In October 1998, Arafat and then Israeli Prime Minister Benjamin Netanyahu signed the Wye Memorandum which "called for the implementation of Israel's first and second redeployments according to the DOP in three phases." Shortly after, Netanyahu's government fell and the Labor Party (under Ehud Barak) won control of the Knesset. Barak's election campaign was mostly geared toward a lasting peace in the Middle East by further implementation of the Wye Memorandum and the Oslo Accord. Barak won the election and attempted to deliver on his promises in 2000, when he and Arafat met at Camp David. Barak had offered Arafat a Palestinian state in all of the Gaza Strip and most of the West Bank with a capital in East Jerusalem. Arafat rejected the proposal, did not make a counteroffer, and walked away from the negotiating table.

== Intifada of 2000 ==
The al-Aqsa Intifada, or Al-Aqsa Intifada, began in late September 2000, around the time Israeli opposition leader Ariel Sharon and a large contingent of armed bodyguards visited the Temple Mount (Haram al-Sharif) complex in Jerusalem and declared the area as an eternal Israeli territory. Widespread riots and attacks broke out among Palestinians and Arab citizens of Israel in Jerusalem and many major Israeli cities, and spread throughout the West Bank and Gaza Strip. The Palestinian Authority (PA) involvement in the Intifada was handled by the Tanzim organization, which was the secret armed branch of Arafat's Fatah party within the PLO. In January 2002, the "PA's direct involvement in the Intifada was confirmed ... when the IDF intercepted a cargo ship in the Red Sea carrying tons of rockets, mortars, and other weapons and ammunition from Iran, earmarked for smuggling into PA [Palestinian Authority] areas." In March 2002, just prior to the Arab Peace Initiative, suicide bombings committed by Palestinians against Israeli civilians "intensified ... in buses, restaurants, coffee shops, and other public places in Israel." An Israeli human rights group, B'Tselem, estimated the death toll to be 3,396 Palestinians and 994 Israelis, although this number is criticized for not showing the whole picture, and not differentiating between combatants and civilians (suicide bombers, for example, are counted in that death toll). The Intifada also created "heavy economic losses to both sides" of the conflict.

== Arab Peace Initiative of 2002 ==
In 2002, Saudi Arabia offered a peace plan in The New York Times and at a summit meeting of the Arab League in Beirut. The plan is based on, but goes beyond UN Security Council Resolution 242 and Resolution 338. It essentially calls for full withdrawal, solution of the refugee problem through the Palestinian "right of return", a Palestinian state with its capital in East Jerusalem in return for fully normalized relations with the whole Arab world. This proposal was the first to receive the unanimous backing of the Arab League.

In response, Israeli Foreign Minister Shimon Peres said: "... the details of every peace plan must be discussed directly between Israel and the Palestinians, and to make this possible, the Palestinian Authority must put an end to terror, the horrifying expression of which we witnessed just last night in Netanya", referring to the Netanya suicide attack.

In 2005, the United States Congress acknowledged that Saudi Arabia has been funding to Hamas and other Palestinian insurgency groups.

== Israel's Disengagement of 2005 ==
In 2005 Israel unilaterally evacuated settlements, and military outposts from the Gaza Strip and the northern West Bank.

The Disengagement Plan was a proposal by Israeli Prime Minister Ariel Sharon, adopted by the government and enacted in August 2005, to remove a permanent Israeli presence from the Gaza Strip and from four Israeli settlements in the northern West Bank. The civilians were evacuated (many forcibly) and the residential buildings demolished after August 15, and the disengagement from the Gaza Strip was completed on 12 September 2005, when the last Israeli soldier left. The military disengagement from the northern West Bank was completed ten days later.

== Aftermath ==
From the election of Mahmoud Ahmadinejad as Iranian President, the Islamic Republic of Iran has actively supported numerous Arab organizations opposing Israel and has also actively called for waging war against it. Iran was widely referred as attempting to create a Shi'a Islam dominated axis, including the Syrian Ba'athist government, dominated by Alawites, Lebanon with Hezbollah dominance and making a strategic alliance with Sunni Hamas in Gaza Strip, which lasted until 2012 (terminating due to Shi'a – Sunni discourse in the Syrian civil war). In January 2007, concerns increased among Israel's leaders that President Mahmoud Ahmadinejad of Iran might be planning some sort of nuclear arms buildup, which might be considered for use in opposition to Israel. The Security Council voted to put sanctions on Iran for its pursuit of nuclear technology.

In 2020, the United States brokered a deal for Israel and the United Arab Emirates (UAE). In return for normalized relations, Israel agreed to suspend controversial plans to annex portions of the West Bank. This was the first time a Gulf Arab country established diplomatic relations with Israel. Shortly after Bahrein, Sudan and Morocco followed and established relations with Israel.

=== Syria ===
Some Israeli officials asserted in January 2007 that there had been some constructive progress in unpublicized talks with Syria. Syria has repeatedly requested that Israel re-commence peace negotiations with the Syrian government. The United States demanded that Israel desist from even exploratory contacts with Syria to test whether Damascus is serious in its declared intentions to hold peace talks with Israel. U.S. Secretary of State Condoleezza Rice was forceful in expressing Washington's view on the matter to Israeli officials that even exploratory negotiations with Syria are not to be attempted. Israel has thus far obeyed Washington's demand to desist. Syrian Ba'ath government representative was expelled from the Arab League in 2012, upon the Syrian civil war.

=== Lebanon ===
==== Israel–Hezbollah conflict of 2006 ====
The 2006 Lebanon War began on 12 July 2006, with an attack by Hezbollah on Israel. Three Israeli soldiers were killed, and two were kidnapped and taken prisoner into Lebanon. In a search and rescue operation to return the captured soldiers, a further five Israel Defense Forces troops were killed. It marked the beginning of a new wave of clashes between Israel and Hezbollah which saw the Lebanese capital, the sole Lebanese international airport, and much of southern Lebanon attacked by the Israelis, while Hezbollah, bombarded northern Israeli cities, striking as far south as the city of Haifa. The conflict killed more than a thousand people, most of whom were Lebanese civilians and Hezbollah fighters; and displaced 974,184 Lebanese and 300,000–500,000 Israelis. Fears were growing that the situation could deteriorate further, with the possibility of either Syria or Iran becoming involved. But a ceasefire was signed, and went into effect 14 August.

==== 2007 rally ====
In January 2007, thousands gathered in Lebanon in a rally to support Hezbollah, and to celebrate the resignation of Israel's top military commander, Dan Halutz. However, in some Lebanese communities, Hezbollah lost popularity, for opposing Lebanon's national government.

== Abbreviated timeline ==
- 1948 Declaration of the Establishment of the State of Israel
- 1948 Arab–Israeli War
- 1948 Establishment of the All-Palestine Protectorate
- 1949 Armistice Agreements
- Jewish exodus from Arab and Muslim countries
- 1956 Suez War
- 1967 Six-Day War
- Khartoum Resolution
- 1970 War of Attrition
- 1973 Yom Kippur War
- Geneva Conference (1973)
- 1978 Camp David Peace Accords between Egypt and Israel
- 1982 Lebanon War
- 1993 Oslo Peace Accords between Palestinians and Israel
- Israel–Jordan peace treaty, 1994
- Camp David 2000 Summit between Palestinians and Israel
- Israel's unilateral disengagement plan

== See also ==
- History of the Israel Defense Forces
- Israeli–Palestinian peace process
- Timeline of the Israeli–Palestinian conflict
- Israeli casualties of war
- List of wars involving Israel
- Outline of the Gaza war
- Palestinian casualties of war
- Timeline of Israeli history
