= The Soviet Basic Thesis on the Middle East Conflict =

The Soviet Basic Thesis on the Middle East Conflict is a document issued by the Soviets on June 17, 1969, in response to the April American State Department peace proposal. The plan was part of the Two Power Talks held between the United States and the Soviet Union in 1969 and it basically reiterates the proposals made by the Soviets in December, 1968, which were approved by Gamal Abdel Nasser. In brief, the Soviet thesis did not agree to direct negotiations between the parties and reaffirmed that Israel should withdraw to the pre-June 5, 1967, lines.

== Background ==
Peace efforts started on November 22, 1967, when the United Nations (UN) Security Council adopted Resolution 242. This resolution still constitutes the basis for all settlement attempts of the Arab Israeli dispute. Essentially, the resolution calls for “recognition of the sovereignty, territorial integrity and political independence of every state in the region and of each people right to live in peace within secure and internationally recognized borders.” It demands that Israel withdraw from occupied territories, but the document did not define these territories. In 1967 the Israelis accepted the Resolution as a basis for negotiations. The Egyptians and Jordanians agreed to it immediately, but only as a precondition to negotiations. However, no progress was achieved since Khartoum resolution was adopted by eight Arab States on September 1, 1967. Two months before the Johnson administration ended its term, in September 1968, the Soviet Union produced a peace proposal on behalf of its Arab clients. According to this plan, which by and large was based on the Resolution 242, the Soviets called for a gradual Israeli withdrawal from the occupied territories in exchange for Arab declarations to end the war and respect a ceases fire.

== Nixon Administration ==
After Richard Nixon's election in November 1968, secret negotiations were held through the State Department between U.S. and the Soviets. The purpose of these negotiations was to reach a settlement. In April 1969, Soviet ambassador Anatoly Dobrynin demanded a concrete settlement proposal from his US counterpart, Joseph Sisco. Apparently, the détente policy focused strictly on obtaining results from the mediation process. Later the same month, after it received Nixon's authorization, Sisco presented Dobrynin with a detailed settlement plan. While the plan was criticized for its omissions, the Soviets waited six weeks before answering it. The counter-proposal submitted by the Soviets to the Americans on June 17, 1969, is known as the Soviet Basic Thesis on the Middle East conflict.
