= Schumann document =

The Schumann Document on the Middle East or Schumann Secret Report was an internal document of the European Political Cooperation approved on 13 May 1971 by the six member states' Ministers of Foreign Affairs that for the first time defined a collective position of the EPC countries on the Arab–Israeli conflict. It is named after the French Minister of Foreign Affairs Maurice Schumann (not to be confused with Robert Schuman, one of the founders of the EU, the Council of Europe and NATO).

== Background ==
In May 1967, the leaders of the six founding EC Member States ('the Six') convened at an EC summit in Rome, which was overshadowed by growing tensions in the Middle East. Even though several leaders felt that the events necessitated a common response, the Six failed to even reach agreement as to how to proceed with discussions on the matter. While Germany was in favor of debating the situation at the summit, France favoured a four-power summit consisting of the UK, the USA, the Soviet Union, and themselves. When the crisis escalated into the Six-Day War shortly after the summit, the national responses differed considerably.

== Creation of the document ==
The EC's failure to deliver coordinated action in the midst of a major international crisis like the Six-Day War was an embarrassment to the Europeans. Economic integration had transformed the EC into a formidable economic power - yet its economic weight stood in sharp contrast to its political sway. The inability to speak with one voice in the days leading up to the Six-Day War and its aftermath together with the resignation of Charles de Gaulle in April 1969 led the EC to develop a new instrument for foreign policy coordination. The EPC was introduced in The Hague summit of December 1969 and placed the Middle East high on its agenda. This led to the drafting of the so-called Schumann document two years later.

== Content ==
The document outlined six principles:

- the establishment of demilitarized zones, in which international forces would be stationed;
- an overall Israeli withdrawal from occupied territories with minor border adjustments;
- the internationalization of Jerusalem;
- the postponement of conclusive solution regarding the sovereignty of east Jerusalem;
- the choice for the 'Arab refugees' of either returning to their home or being indemnified;
- the approval of the Jarring Mission.

== Reception ==
When its contents were leaked to the German press it was contested what the status of the document was. France claimed it represented the official policy of the Community while Germany and the Netherlands maintained it was no more than a working paper that had been prepared for discussion.
