= International law and the Arab–Israeli conflict =

The international law bearing on issues of Arab–Israeli conflict, which became a major arena of regional and international tension since the birth of Israel in 1948, resulting in several disputes between a number of Arab countries and Israel. There is an international consensus that some of the actions of the states involved in the Arab–Israeli conflict violate international law, but some of the involved states dispute this.

In the Six-Day War in 1967, Israel pre-empted what many Israeli leaders believed to be an imminent Arab attack and invaded and occupied territory that had itself been invaded and occupied by neighboring Egypt, Syria and Jordan in the 1948 Arab–Israeli War. Following the peace treaties between Israel and Egypt and Israel and Jordan, in which the states relinquished their claims to the Israeli-occupied territory, the conflict today mostly revolves around the Palestinians.

The main points of dispute (also known as the "core issues" or "final status issues") are the following:

- Israel's annexation of East Jerusalem (Israel has also annexed the Golan Heights, but that territory is not claimed by Palestinians), construction of Israeli settlements in the Palestinian territories, and the erection of the Israeli West Bank barrier;
- how borders should be decided between Israel and a Palestinian state;
- the right of return of the Palestinian refugees from the 1948 and 1967 wars.

== Customary international law ==
Unlike a treaty agreement, customary international law is usually not written. Customs of a longstanding nature can be codified by formal treaties. The Laws and Customs of War on Land (Hague Convention IV) of 18 October 1907 and the Geneva Conventions of 12 August 1949 are examples of conventional laws that are declarations of customary law. To prove that a certain rule is customary one has to show that it is reflected in state practice and that there exists a conviction in the international community that such practice is required as a matter of law. In this context, "practice" relates to official state practice and therefore includes formal statements by states. A contrary practice by some states is possible because if this contrary practice is condemned by the other states, or subsequently denied by the government itself, the original rule is actually confirmed.

In accordance with article 13 of the UN Charter, the General Assembly is obligated to initiate studies and to make recommendations that encourage the progressive development of international law and its codification. Acting in that agreed-upon treaty capacity, the General Assembly affirmed the principles of international law that were recognized by the Charter of the Nuremberg Tribunal and directed that they should be codified. Many of those same principles were subsequently adopted for inclusion in draft treaties that were under development by the International Law Commission of the United Nations. They were also incorporated through the agreement of the High Contracting Parties into the Geneva Conventions of 1949. In 1993 the UN Security Council "acting under Chapter VII of the Charter on the United Nations" established an international tribunal and approved a Statute that had been recommended in a report submitted by the UN Secretary-General. It concluded beyond doubt that the law applicable in armed conflict as embodied in the Geneva Conventions of 12 August 1949 and the Hague Convention (IV) of 18 October 1907 had become part of international customary law, and should be part of the subject matter jurisdiction of the International Criminal Tribunal for the former Yugoslavia. In 1998, the United Nations Diplomatic Conference of Plenipotentiaries approved the Rome Statute of the International Criminal Court. The offenses against unwritten customary international law were amenable to prosecution by international tribunals, like the Nuremberg Tribunal, long before they were codified and incorporated into the subsequent treaties.

== Conventions, resolutions and declarations ==
Many provisions of international law are based upon principles and norms that were developed in the Americas during the 19th century. They include the principle of uti possidetis of 1810 and the related Monroe Doctrine of 1823, regarding non-colonization and non-intervention. In 1890, the First International Conference of American States adopted a proscription against territorial conquest and agreed upon the non-recognition of all acquisitions made by force. Those principles and regional understandings were recognized in Article 21 of the Covenant of the League of Nations. The system of mandates contained in article 22 of the Covenant was based in part upon those normative declarations and state practices. The Kellogg–Briand Pact of 1928, and the League of Nations approval of the Stimson Doctrine in 1931 were efforts designed to end the practice of coercive territorial revisionism through international law.

After World War II, the principles of international law that upheld the territorial integrity of states were incorporated in the Charter of the United Nations, and subsequently reaffirmed in the Declaration on the Granting of Independence to Colonial Countries and Peoples, the Organization of African Unity charter respecting the integrity of inherited boundaries, and the 1975 CSCE Helsinki Final Act which contained a proscription that boundaries could only be altered by consent. The Chapter on Fundamental Rights and Duties of States in the Charter of the Organization of American States provides that:

The territory of a State is inviolable; it may not be the object, even temporarily, of military occupation or of other measures of force taken by another State, directly or indirectly, on any grounds whatever. No territorial acquisitions or special advantages obtained either by force or by other means of coercion shall be recognized.

== Legal issues related to sovereignty ==
In their relations with other peoples and countries during the colonial era the Concert of Europe adopted a fundamental legal principle that the supreme legal authority, or sovereignty, lay outside the indigenous nations. That legal principle resulted in the creation of a large number of dependent states with restricted sovereignty or colonial autonomy. Various terms were used to describe different types of dependent states, such as condominium, mandate, protectorate, colony, and vassal state. After World War II there was strong international pressure to eliminate dependencies associated with colonialism.

The vast majority of the world's sovereign states resulted from the grant of independence to colonial peoples and dependent territories. Prior to World War II many states were formed as a result of wars that were resolved through peace treaties. Some of these peace treaties were imposed on the losing side in a war; others came about as a result of negotiations that followed wars, or were entered into under the threat of war. In these cases, the applicable law was bound in peace treaties among the states. The practice of territorial aggrandizement was prohibited by the UN Charter, a multilateral treaty, and the authoritative explanation of its legal principles contained in UN General Assembly resolution 2625 (XXV) of 24 October 1970, Declaration of Principles of International Law Concerning Friendly Relations and Co-operation Among States in Accordance with the Charter of the United Nations. The purpose of the United Nations is the prevention and removal of threats to peace and the suppression of acts of aggression. The Charter requires that members shall refrain from the threat of, or use of force. According to communis opinio the obligations imposed by those provisions of the Charter have become part of customary international law and are binding on all States, whether they are members of the United Nations or not.

=== Treaties and resolutions ===
The communities and Holy Places of Palestine have been under the express protection of international law since the early 19th century. For example, the International Court of Justice advisory opinion noted that access to the Christian, Jewish and Islamic Holy Places had been protected by various laws dating back to the early Ottoman Empire, with the latest provisions having been incorporated into the UN Partition Plan, article 13 of the League of Nations Mandate, and Article 62 of the Treaty of Berlin of 13 July 1878.

The Treaty of Paris in 1814 called for a congress of the Great Powers of Europe to settle the future boundaries of the continent. Nearly every state in Europe was represented, and among other things a prohibition on unilateral annexation was adopted. This bolstered the concept of territorial integrity, which was enshrined in the Congress of Vienna in 1815.

The 1856 Treaty of Paris declared that the Sublime Porte, the government of the Ottoman Empire, had been admitted to participate in the Public Law and System (Concert) of Europe. The European system of public law governed territorial accessions and the creation of new states. After the Russo-Turkish Wars in 1878, Russia and the Ottoman Empire concluded the Treaty of San Stefano. Because it modified the terms of the Treaty of Paris of 1856, the other signatories called for a Congress to obtain its revision. The Treaty of Berlin of 1878 was the result. Montenegro, Serbia, and Romania were recognized as new independent states and granted specific territory on condition that religious, political, and property rights of minorities were guaranteed on a nondiscriminatory basis. The delegates of the First Zionist Congress acknowledged these customary diplomatic precedents in the Basle Program. It stated that the aim of Zionism was the creation of a home for the Jewish people in Palestine, secured by public law.

During the course of the British mandate in Palestine, the British government sought to reconcile the two claims in different ways. A number of proposals and declarations were put forward, all of which were rejected by one party or the other, and usually both. Again, two different interpretations apply:

- The Israeli perspective is that the United Kingdom only had the mandate to propose solutions in keeping with the resolutions adopted at the San Remo Conference, not to amend them. In other words, that the relevant resolutions adopted at the San Remo Conference are the public law that awarded the Jewish people de jure sovereignty over Palestine.
- The Arab perspective views British proposals as promises (subsequently broken) to the people of Palestine, see also the Hussein-McMahon Correspondence.

After World War II, the British government decided to abandon its mandate in Palestine. A United Nations Commission (UNSCOP) was assigned to recommend a solution to the conflict to the General Assembly. The recommendation was a partition plan that would result in an Arab and a Jewish state in the remaining mandate, and Jerusalem under UN rule, was approved by the General Assembly.

However, the resolution served partially as a basis for the Israeli Declaration of Independence to take effect when Great Britain's mandate expired. Many states granted the State of Israel either de facto or de jure recognition. Israel was accepted as a sovereign member state in the United Nations and has diplomatic relations with many, but not all, sovereign states.

=== The legal consequence of subsequent events ===
Several events have affected the legal issues related to the conflict:

- After the war in 1948, the mandate ended up being split between Israel, Egypt and Jordan. Israel and Jordan annexed all areas under their administration; Egypt maintained a military occupation of Gaza. The United Nations attempted to assert its authority over Jerusalem but the designated mediator, Count Bernadotte, was killed by the militant Zionist group Lehi while pursuing his official duties, and the city ended up being split between Israel and Jordan. Lehi had feared that Israel would agree to Bernadotte's peace proposals, which they considered disastrous, unaware that the provisional Israeli government had already rejected a proposal by Bernadotte the day before.
- Although there were numerous informal and backchannel communications between Israel and Arab states through the years, all Arab states refused to accept Israel's sovereignty until 1979, and most (excluding Jordan, Mauritania, and Egypt) persisted in rejecting Israel's desire to exist (see Khartoum Resolution) until the 2002 Arab Peace Initiative that offers Israel peace and normal relations with all Arab countries if Israel withdraws from all areas occupied in the 1967 war and "attain a just solution" to the Palestinian refugee problem "to be agreed upon in accordance with the UN General Assembly Resolution 194".
- The war in 1967 brought all remaining parts of the Mandate (as defined by Great Britain in 1947) as well as the Sinai Peninsula and parts of the Golan Heights under Israeli administration. Israel subsequently effectively annexed East Jerusalem, asserting that the West Bank and Gaza were "disputed territories". The United Nations Security Council rejected the effective annexation of East Jerusalem and Golan Heights as "null and void" in United Nations Security Council Resolution 478 and United Nations Security Council Resolution 497 respectively, and consider Israel to hold the Gaza Strip, the West Bank, including East Jerusalem, and the Golan Heights under military occupation.
- Both as a result of the wars in 1948 and 1967, Arab residents of the former Mandate were displaced and classified by the United Nations as "refugees".
- In approximately the same time frame, most Jews in Arab states fled or were forced to leave, with most of them absorbed by Israel.
- United Nations Security Council issued resolution 242 that set the framework for a resolution through "land for peace".
- In 1979, Egypt and Israel signed a peace treaty, Israel returning Sinai in return for peace, agreeing on international borders between the two states, but leaving the disposition of Gaza for peace negotiations between Israel and the Palestinians.
- In 1988, the PLO declared "the establishment of the State of Palestine in the land of Palestine with its capital at Jerusalem." Jordan relinquished its claims to the West Bank.
- In 1993, the PLO and Israel signed a declaration of principles that included mutual recognition and the ultimate goal of establishing self rule for the Palestinian people.
- In 1994, Jordan and Israel also signed a peace treaty.
- No other Arab state has granted legal recognition of Israel's sovereignty. A formal state of war still exists between Israel and several Arab states, though armistice agreements govern interaction between the states.
- Several attempts at finalizing the terms for a peace agreement between Israel and the PLO have failed. In 2006 the Palestinians elected Hamas into power, a party that does not recognize Israel as legitimate.

== Legal issues related to the wars ==
Sovereign states have the right to defend themselves against overt external aggression, in the form of an invasion or other attack. A number of states assert that this principle extends to the right to launch military actions to reduce a threat, protect vital interests, or pre-empt a possible attack or emerging threat.

=== Wars between Israel and Arab states ===
Security Council resolution 242, emphasized "the inadmissibility of the acquisition of territory by war," setting the stage for controversy on the legal status of areas captured in 1967, and in 1948.

There are two interpretations of this matter:

- The Israeli position is that:
  - The wars in 1956 and 1967 were waged by Israel to ensure the state's survival. As most hostilities were initiated by the Arab side, Israel had to fight and win these wars in order to ensure the state's sovereignty and safety. Territories captured in the course of those wars are therefore legitimately under Israeli administration for both security reasons and to deter hostile states from belligerence.
  - In the absence of peace treaties between all the parties at war, Israel has under all circumstances the right to maintain control of the captured territories. Their ultimate disposition should be a result of peace treaties, and not a condition for them. Even so, Israel asserts that:
    - The 1956 war was caused by a pattern of Egyptian belligerence against Israel, culminating with the nationalization of the Suez Canal and the blockage of the canal for Israeli traffic in violation of the Convention of Constantinople and other relevant treaties, in their view a clear casus belli (i.e., an act justifying war)
    - The 1967 war was similarly caused by the closing of the Straits of Tiran, the rejection of UN forces in the Sinai desert, and the redeployment of Egyptian forces. Jordan and Syria entered the war in spite of Israeli efforts to keep these frontiers peaceful.
    - The 1973 war was a surprise attack against Israel by Syria and Egypt.
- The Arab position is that:
  - The 1956 war came after an Israeli attack on the Gaza strip killing 25 Egyptian soldiers, and was a result of a conspiracy between France, the United Kingdom and Israel in violation of Egypt's sovereignty. Egypt claimed several legal justifications for refusing Israel use of the Suez Canal, including the right of self-defence.
  - The war in 1967 was an unprovoked act of aggression aimed at expanding the boundaries of Israel, and the territories captured during this war are illegally occupied and this occupation must end.

The dispute has now shifted to the conflict between the Palestinians and Israel.

== Legal issues related to occupation ==
The Geneva Conventions and other international tractates recognize that land: a) conquered in the course of a war; and b) the disposition of which is unresolved through subsequent peace treaties is "occupied" and subject to international laws of war and international humanitarian law. This includes special protection of individuals in those territories, limitations on the use of land in those territories, and access by international relief agencies.

=== Jerusalem ===
Recognizing the controversial nature of sovereignty over Jerusalem, UNSCOP recommended the city be placed under United Nations administration in the partition plan. This amendment was approved by the General Assembly in November 1947; consistent with the respective stance of both sides regarding the partition plan-it was accepted by the Israel and rejected by the Arab states. During, the subsequent 1948 war, Israel captured and held a western portion of Jerusalem's city limits along much of the lands relegated to the proposed Arab state laid out in the partition plan. Most of Jerusalem, including all of the old city, came under the control of the Hashemite Kingdom of Jordan, with the proposed Arab state for Palestinians never coming into existence. Israel declared Jerusalem its capital in 1950, establishing governmental offices in area it controlled. Soon afterward in 1950, Jordan annexed the eastern part along with the remainder of the West Bank.

After the 1967 war, Israel put the parts of Jerusalem that had been captured during the war under its jurisdiction and civilian administration, establishing new municipal borders. Arguing that this did not amount to annexation at the time, subsequent legal actions have been interpreted as consistent with an annexation.

On July 30, 1980, the Knesset passed a basic law making "Jerusalem, complete and united…the capital of Israel." Since then Israel has extended the municipal boundaries several times.

On October 6, 2002, Yasser Arafat signed the Palestinian Legislative Council's law making Al Quds "the eternal capital of Palestine."

International bodies such as the United Nations have condemned Israel's Basic Law concerning Jerusalem as a violation of the Fourth Geneva Convention and therefore hold that the establishment of the city as Israel's capital is against international law. Consequently, countries have established embassies to Israel's government outside of Jerusalem, or only with the western section of the city recognized as legal Israeli territory. Similarly, missions to the Palestinian National Authority are at the insistence of Israel's government located outside of Jerusalem. Despite both Israel and Palestine's long standing claim of Jerusalem as their capital, central government administration is largely conducted out of Tel Aviv and Ramallah for the Israel and Palestine respectively.

Israel has filed strenuous protests against this policy, asserting that:

- There is no basis in international law for denying Israel's establishing its capital in Jerusalem, because there is no binding treaty that makes the city a Corpus separatum.
- The 1980 Basic Law is not a legal innovation and only affirms Israel's long-standing position on Jerusalem.
- Israel has the sovereign right to establish its capital at the most meaningful place for its people, and its claim is unique.
- Objections to Jerusalem as Israel's capital are political in nature, and not legal.

In its 2004 advisory opinion on the legality of the Israeli West Bank barrier, the International Court of Justice concluded that the lands captured by Israel in the 1967 war, including East Jerusalem, are occupied territory.

=== Settlement in territories ===
Article 49 of the Fourth Geneva Convention states in paragraph 1,

Individual or mass forcible transfers, as well as deportations of protected persons from occupied territory to the territory of the Occupying Power or to that of any other country, occupied or not, are prohibited, regardless of their motive.

and states in paragraph 6,

The Occupying Power shall not deport or transfer parts of its own civilian population into the territory it occupies.

Arguments supporting the position that establishing, funding, or allowing settlements in the territories is a violation of international law are,

- The International Committee of the Red Cross' commentaries to the Geneva Conventions state that Article 49, paragraph 6, "is intended to prevent a practice adopted during the Second World War by certain Powers, which transferred portions of their own population to occupied territory for political and racial reasons or in order, as they claimed, to colonize those territories." It further notes "that in this paragraph the meaning of the words 'transfer' and 'deport' is rather different from that in which they are used in the other paragraphs of Article 49 since they do not refer to the movement of protected persons but to that of nationals of the occupying Power". The committee has on several occasions described the establishment of Israeli settlements in the occupied territories as a violation of the Fourth Geneva Convention.
- the International Court of Justice, in paragraph 120 of its advisory opinion on the "Legal Consequences of the Construction of a Wall in the Occupied Palestinian Territory", asserts that: "That provision [article 49(6)] prohibits not only deportations or forced transfers of population such as those carried out during the Second World War, but also any measures taken by an occupying Power in order to organize or encourage transfers of parts of its own population into the occupied territory" and "concludes that the Israeli settlements in the Occupied Palestinian Territory (including East Jerusalem) have been established in breach of international law". The dissenting judge Thomas Buergenthal agreed that "this provision applies to the Israeli settlements in the West Bank and that their existence violates Article 49, paragraph 6".
- Article 8(2)(b)(viii) of the International Criminal Court Rome Statute defines "[t]he transfer, directly or indirectly, by the Occupying Power of parts of its own civilian population into the territory it occupies" as a war crime. Israel did initially sign the statute, but later declared its intention not to ratify it.
- The Security Council has in Resolution 446 determined: "that the policy and practices of Israel in establishing settlements in the Palestinian and other Arab territories occupied since 1967 have no legal validity".

Arguments supporting the position that settlement in the territories does not violate international law are,

- Israel ministry of foreign affairs argues "As the West Bank and Gaza Strip were not under the legitimate and recognized sovereignty of any state prior to the Six Day War, they should not be considered occupied territories."
- Article 49 of the Fourth Geneva Convention is limited to transfers or deportations into or out of Occupied Territories which are 'forcible'.
- Article 49 "cannot be viewed as prohibiting the voluntary return of individuals to the towns and villages from which they, or their ancestors, had been ousted" from living, e.g., in Gush Etzion, Jerusalem, or Hebron before 1948.
- The Palestinians, as part of the Oslo Accords , agreed that the issue of settlements in the territories shall fall under the jurisdiction of final status negotiations (Article V, Section 3).
- Jews have a legal right to settle the areas according to the Mandate for Palestine (specifically Article 6 of the mandate concerning Jewish settlements) and to such documents as the Faisal Weizmann Agreement. The British Mandate (granted by the League of Nations) specifically encouraged "close settlement by Jews on the land."

== Legal issues related to the Israeli West Bank barrier ==
See related article Israeli West Bank barrier.

Israel has completed long stretches of barriers within the West Bank, separating Israel proper, Israeli settlements and large parts of the Palestinian territories from Palestinian cities and population centers.

- Those who question the legality of the barrier make the following arguments:
  - The barrier has been found to be illegal by the legal arm of the United Nations (the International Court of Justice).
  - At various locations, the selected route of the barrier required the demolition of homes and the expulsion of the residents of those homes, in violation of Article 49 of the Fourth Geneva Convention.
  - The barrier and Israel's series of checkpoints have made life nearly impossible for residents of the West Bank, constituting collective punishment. Article 33 of the Fourth Geneva Convention categorize collective punishment in occupied territories as a war crime.
  - At various locations, the selected route of the barrier required the demolition of Palestinian property, in violation of article 53 of the Fourth Geneva Conventions.
  - The barrier is an attempt to establish de facto borders between Israel and a future Palestinian state, in effect annexing large parts of West Bank and all of East Jerusalem, in violation of numerous United Nations Security Council Resolutions.
  - The barrier attempts to separate Palestinians from their means of livelihood and from interaction with others and it, therefore, qualifies as apartheid. Apartheid is illegal as per the 2002 Rome Statute of the International Criminal Court and is considered a crime against humanity (see also: Israeli apartheid).
  - The barrier is constructed inside of the West Bank, making it completely in violation of international law.
  - The barrier differs from all other protective barriers built by any other state (such as the Berlin Wall, or the US-Mexico border) in that it is not constructed on the border between states but rather crosses the occupied territories in numerous locations, and with existing/expanding settlements, divides the occupied territories into 4 or 5 cantons.
- Israel defends the security barrier by arguing that:
  - The barrier and its route are solely security measures that will have no bearing on future peace negotiations.
  - The land is not subject to the Geneva Conventions.
  - The Geneva Conventions explicitly allows structures to be built for purposes of self-defense.
  - The Israeli Supreme Court is reviewing the route on a continuous basis and has forced it to change.
  - StandWithUs, a pro-Israel advocacy organization, defends the security fence by pointing out:
    - Israel did not begin building the fence until 2003 when terrorism reached unprecedented levels.
    - The fence is similar to barriers that dozens of other democracies have built to keep out terrorists or illegal immigrants, such as the barriers between the United States and Mexico, India and Kashmir, Spain and Morocco, North and South Korea and even the walls within Belfast that separate Protestant and Catholic neighborhoods.
    - Since construction of the fence began in 2003, the number of completed terrorist attacks has dropped by more than 90%.
    - 97% of the barrier is a chain-link fence similar to those along the United States's border; only 3% (10 miles) is a concrete wall, built to prevent sniper shooting prevalent in certain areas.
    - Only 5%–8% of the West Bank and less than 1% of Palestinians will end up on the Israeli side of the fence.
    - Palestinians can bring their specific grievances about the barrier to Israel's Supreme Court, which in several cases has ruled that the fence must be re-routed.

In 2004, the United Nations passed a number of resolutions and the International Court of Justice issued an opinion where judges voted 14–1 that the portions of the Israeli West Bank barrier that are located within occupied Palestinian territories are illegal under international law. Prior to the opinion, Israel had made the claim that the ICJ lacked standing to rule on the legality of the barrier, which the court unanimously rejected. On July 20, 2004, the United Nations General Assembly passed a resolution demanding that Israel obey the ICJ opinion. 150 nations voted in favor of the resolution, 7 voted against, and 10 abstained.

=== United Nations ===
In October 2003, the United States vetoed a United Nations Security Council resolution, which stated:

The construction by Israel, the occupying power, of a wall in the Occupied Territories departing from the armistice line of 1949 is illegal under relevant provisions of international law and must be ceased and reversed.

The United Kingdom, Germany, Bulgaria, and Cameroon abstained from the vote. The justification given by the U.S. for the veto was that the resolution did not condemn terrorist attacks made by Palestinian groups (see Negroponte doctrine). The United States, however, has been condemned by some countries for its support of the barrier.

One week later, on October 21, a similar (though non-binding) resolution (ES-10/13) was passed by the UN General Assembly 144–4 with 12 abstentions. The resolution said the barrier was "in contradiction to international law", and demanded that Israel "stop and reverse" its construction. Israel called the resolution a "farce".

The United Nations General Assembly has voted on a resolution bearing on issues of international law as applied to the conflict every year since 1974.

=== Process of the ICJ ===
In December 2003, the United Nations General Assembly passed a resolution requesting the International Court of Justice (ICJ) to make a non-binding advisory opinion on the "legal consequences arising" from the construction of the barrier.

The hearings began in February 2004. The Palestinian Authority is not a member of the court but was allowed to make a submission by virtue of being a UN observer and a co-sponsor of the General Assembly resolution. In January 2004, the court also authorized the League of Arab States and the Organisation of the Islamic Conference to make submissions.

Israel initially announced that it would cooperate with the court, while noting that advisory opinions of the ICJ are not binding. Israel later made a written submission to the court rejecting the authority of the court to rule on the case, but announced (on February 12, 2004) that it would not appear at the court to make oral submissions.

On January 30, 2004, Israel announced officially it did not recognize ICJ authority to rule over the barrier issue. Israel also dispatched a 120-page document, elaborating on the security needs to build the "terror prevention fence" and purporting to demonstrate the atrocities committed by Palestinian terrorists. The document also included a judicial part with legal accounts supporting Israel's claim that the issue of the barrier is political and not in the ICJ authority.

On 23, 24, and 25 February 2004 the hearings before the International Court of Justice took place in the Peace Palace at the Hague.

=== 2004 advisory opinion of the ICJ ===
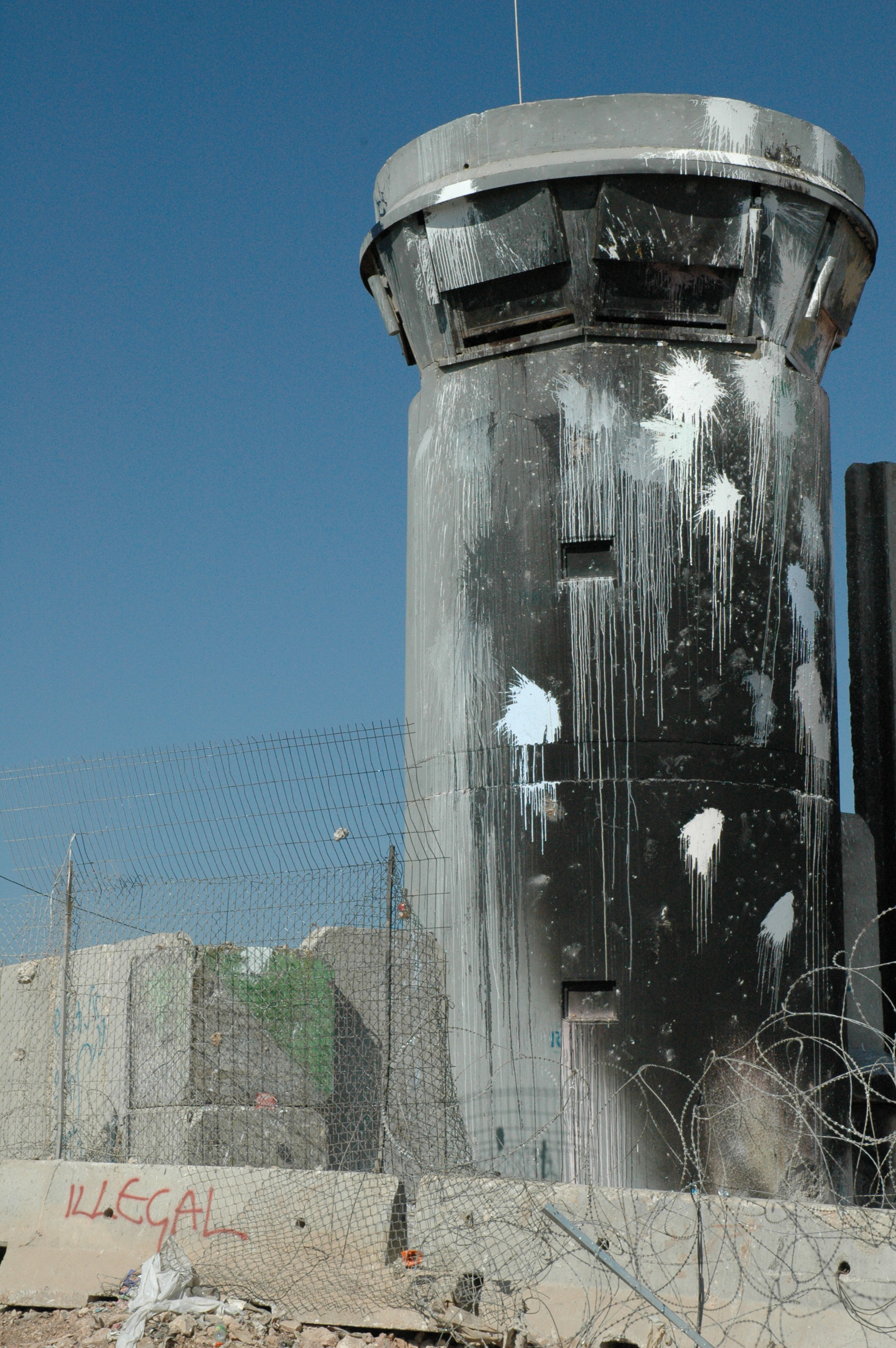
Graffiti on the barrier, reading "Illegal."

On July 9, 2004, the International Court of Justice issued its opinion against the barrier, calling for it to be removed and the Arab residents to be compensated for any damage done. The Court advised that the United Nations General Assembly, which had asked for the opinion, and the Security Council should act on the issue.

A summary of the opinion is as follows:

1. The construction of the wall by the occupying power Israel in the Occupied Palestinian Territory, including around East Jerusalem and its regime are "contrary to international law”.
2. Israel is obligated to stop construction of the wall, including around East Jerusalem and to dismantle the structure, and to repeal all legislative and regulatory acts relating to the wall.
3. Israel is obligated to "make reparation for all damages caused" by the wall, including around East Jerusalem”.
4. All states are under an obligation not to recognize the illegal wall and "not to render aid or assistance in maintaining the situation", and to "ensure compliance by Israel with international humanitarian law" in accordance with the Fourth Geneva Convention relating to the Protection of Civilian Persons in Time of War 1949, while "respecting the United Nations Charter and international law, as embodied in that convention”".
5. The United Nations General Assembly and the Security Council should consider what further action is required to bring to an end the illegal wall and the associated regime.”

The opinion was passed 14–1 by the court judges, except for the 4th decision which was passed 13–2.

Thomas Buergenthal, the American judge, was the sole dissenting member of the 15 judges on this ICJ panel. In his declaration, he stated that there was much in the court's opinion with which he agreed but that the court should have declined to hear the case since it did not have before it "relevant facts bearing directly on issues of Israel's legitimate right of self-defense". He stated that his dissenting opinion "should not be seen as reflecting my view that the construction of the wall by Israel on the Occupied Palestinian Territory does not raise serious questions as a matter of international law." On the point of portions of the wall that were being built beyond the green line, which Israel stated were to defend settlements, Buergenthal stated:

Paragraph 6 of Article 49 of the Fourth Geneva Convention also does not admit exceptions on grounds of military or security exigencies. It provides that "the Occupying Power shall not deport or transfer parts of its own civilian population into the territory it occupies". I agree that this provision applies to the Israeli settlements in the West Bank and that their existence violates Article 49, paragraph 6. It follows that the segments of the wall being built by Israel to protect the settlements are ipso facto in violation of international humanitarian law. Moreover, given the demonstrable great hardship to which the affected Palestinian population is being subjected in and around the enclaves created by those segments of the wall, seriously doubt that the wall would here satisfy the proportionality requirement to qualify as a legitimate measure of self-defence.

Judge Higgins, in her separate opinion to International Court of Justice, Advisory Opinion of 9 July 2004, stated: «I also find unpersuasive the Court's contention that, as the uses of force emanate from occupied territory, it is not an armed attack "by one State against another". I fail to understand the Court's view that an occupying Power loses the right to defend its own civilian citizens at home if the attacks emanate from the occupied territory – a territory which it has found not to have been annexed» (§ 34).

=== Reaction to the ICJ ===
The opinion was accepted by the United Nations General Assembly, on July 20, 2004, it passed a resolution demanding that Israel obey the ICJ opinion. Israel, the US, Australia, the Federated States of Micronesia, the Marshall Islands, and Palau voted against the resolution, 10 nations abstained, and 150 nations voted in favor.

Palestinian leader Yasser Arafat said: "This is an excellent decision. This is a victory for the Palestinian people and for all the free peoples of the world."

Israel rejected the ICJ opinion and emphasized the barrier's self-defense aspect , and stressed that Israel will continue to build the barrier. The United States also rejected the opinion, declaring that the issue was of political rather than legal nature. Colin Powell stated that barrier was effective against terror, and noted that the ICJ opinion was not binding, but insisted that Israel not use the barrier to predetermine permanent borders.

Numerous human rights organizations welcomed the ICJ opinion. Amnesty International said that Israel should immediately cease constructing the barrier. The governments of Israel's neighbors Lebanon, Syria, Jordan, and Egypt also welcomed the opinion.

On July 13, 2004, the US House of Representatives passed Resolution HR 713 deploring "the misuse of the International Court of Justice (ICJ)... for the narrow political purpose of advancing the Palestinian position on matters Palestinian authorities have said should be the subject of negotiations between the parties." The Resolution further stated that twenty-three countries, including every member of the G8 and several other European states, had "submitted objections on various grounds against the ICJ hearing the case."

=== 2024 advisory opinion of the ICJ ===
In early 2023, the ICJ accepted a request from the UN for an advisory opinion on the legal consequences arising from the policies and practices of Israel in the occupied Palestinian territory including East Jerusalem. The court published its opinion in July 2024.

The court declared in its landmark opinion that the Israel's occupation of Palestinian territories violated international law. Israel should cease settlement activity in the West Bank and East Jerusalem and end its "illegal" occupation of these areas and the Gaza Strip as soon as possible.

The court also said that Israeli restrictions on Palestinians in the occupied territories constituted "systemic discrimination based on, inter alia, race, religion or ethnic origin", finding that Israel was in breach of article 3 of the International Convention on the Elimination of All Forms of Racial Discrimination (CERD), which says: “Parties particularly condemn racial segregation and apartheid and undertake to prevent, prohibit and eradicate all practices of this nature in territories under their jurisdiction.”

The court identified the following breaches of international law:

- Forcible evictions, extensive house demolitions and restrictions on residence and movement.
- The transfer by Israel of settlers to the West Bank and East Jerusalem and maintenance of their presence.
- Its failure to prevent or to punish attacks by settlers.
- Restricting the access of the Palestinian population to water.
- Israel’s use of the natural resources in the occupied Palestinian territory.
- The extension of Israel’s law to the West Bank and East Jerusalem.

Reparations to be made included restitution, compensation and/or satisfaction, with the former said to include "Israel’s obligation to return the land and other immovable property, as well as all assets seized from any natural or legal person since its occupation started in 1967, and all cultural property and assets taken from Palestinians and Palestinian institutions, including archives and documents". This also required "the evacuation of all settlers from existing settlements and the dismantling of the parts of the wall constructed by Israel that are situated in the Occupied Palestinian Territory, as well as allowing all Palestinians displaced during the occupation to return to their original place of residence." Where restitution should prove materially possible, compensation should be paid instead.

Israel rejected the court's opinion.

== Legal issues related to refugees ==
=== Legal definition of refugee ===
The tractate that is most often invoked for legally defining refugees is the 1951 Convention Relating to the Status of Refugees. The definition of "refugee" is most often summarized as

... a person who is outside his/her country of nationality or habitual residence; has a well-founded fear of persecution because of his/her race, religion, nationality, membership in a particular social group or political opinion; and is unable or unwilling to avail himself/herself of the protection of that country, or to return there, for fear of persecution. The convention is administered by the United Nations High Commissioner for Refugees (UNHCR).

The United Nations Relief and Works Agency for Palestine Refugees in the Near East (UNRWA), which was established prior to the 1951 convention in response to the humanitarian crisis, applies a different definition:

Under UNRWA's operational definition, Palestine refugees are persons whose normal place of residence was Palestine between June 1946 and May 1948, who lost both their homes and means of livelihood as a result of the 1948 Arab–Israeli conflict. UNRWA's services are available to all those living in its area of operations who meet this definition, who are registered with the Agency and who need assistance. UNRWA's definition of a refugee also covers the descendants of persons who became refugees in 1948.

Since the definition used by UNRWA was originally made on an operational basis rather than dictated by specific international law, obligations and rights related to Palestinian refugees under international law are a matter of some debate. The debate centers on questions such as: whether the status of refugees can properly be passed through inheritance to individuals who have never lived in the vacated areas, and whether individuals who have repatriated in other countries can legally claim refugee status.

Palestinian refugees were excluded from the 1951 Convention due to the clause that "This Convention shall not apply to persons who are at present receiving from organs or agencies of the United Nations other than the United Nations High Commissioner for Refugees protection or assistance." As interpreted by UNHCR, this caused some anomalies, since UNRWA admits some persons as refugees that are not automatically admitted by the convention, and, conversely, some of the legal protections given to refugees by the convention were not available to most Palestinians. In 2002, UNHCR adopted a revised interpretation that fills some of these gaps. The BADIL Resource Center for Palestinian Residency and Refugee Rights published a critical analysis of UNHCR revised interpretation of the 1951 Refugee Convention.

== See also ==
- Bibliography of the Arab–Israeli conflict
- Media coverage of the Arab–Israeli conflict

=== Arab–Israeli peace diplomacy and treaties ===
- Paris Peace Conference, 1919
- Faisal–Weizmann Agreement (1919)
- San Remo Conference, 1920
- Palestine Mandate, 1922
- 1949 Armistice Agreements
- Camp David Accords (1978)
- Egypt–Israel peace treaty (1979)
- Madrid Conference of 1991
- Oslo Accords (1993)
- Israel–Jordan peace treaty (1994)
- Camp David 2000 Summit
- Israeli–Palestinian peace process
- Projects working for peace among Israelis and Arabs
- List of Middle East peace proposals
