= 1967 Arab League summit =

Meeting of Arab regional organization

Arab League summit
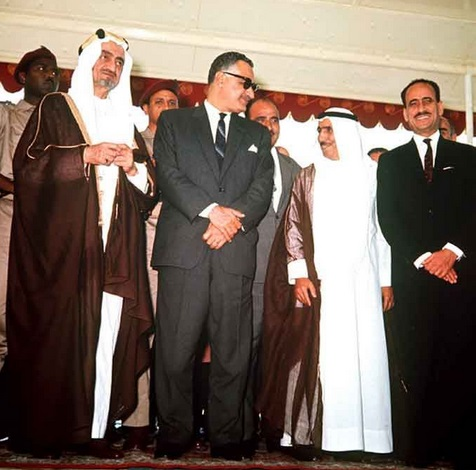
- Left to right: Faisal of Saudi Arabia, Nasser of Egypt, Sallal of Yemen, Sabah of Kuwait and Arif of Iraq
- Host country: Sudan
- Date: August 29, 1967
- Cities: Khartoum

The 1967 Arab League summit was held on August 29 in Khartoum as the fourth Arab League Summit in the aftermath of the Arab defeat by Israel in the Six-Day War, and is famous for its Khartoum Resolution, known as "The Three No's"; No peace with Israel, no recognition of Israel, no negotiations with Israel. The summit also resolved that the "oil-rich Arab states" give financial aid to the states who lost the war and to "help them rebuild their military forces." The final communique of the meeting "underscored the Palestinians' right to regain the whole of Palestine—that is, to destroy the State of Israel." The outcome of this summit influenced Israeli foreign policy for decades.

All Arab countries were represented at the summit, except for Syria.

== Background ==
Israel had been at war with Arab states several times since its Declaration of Independence. The first Arab–Israeli War resulted in the establishment of a Jewish state, 1948 Palestinian exodus, and the 1949 Armistice Agreements. Egypt had restricted Israel access to the Suez Canal, leading to the 1956 Suez Crisis, wherein Israel invaded Egypt with the goal of re-gaining their access to the shipping lane.

Following the crisis, Egypt agreed to the stationing of a United Nations Emergency Force in the Sinai to ensure all parties would comply with the 1949 Armistice Agreements. In the following years, there were numerous minor clashes between Israel and its Arab neighbors, particularly Syria, leading them to sign a mutual defense agreement with Egypt. On November 13, 1966, in response to Palestine Liberation Organization guerrilla activity, including a mine attack that left three dead, the Israeli Defence Force (IDF) attacked the village of as-Samu in the Jordanian-occupied West Bank. This precipitated the massing of troops by Jordan, and the launch by Israel of Operation Focus, which began the Six-Day War.

Operation Focus severely crippled Egypt's aerial capabilities, and Israel occupied the Sinai Peninsula, which they would hold on to until 1982, when they were formally recognised by Egypt. By the ceasefire, Israel was also occupying the formerly Egyptian Gaza Strip, as well as the Golan Heights from Syria, and the West Bank (including East Jerusalem) from Jordan.

== Proceedings ==
،لا صلح مع إسرائيل
،لا تفاوض مع إسرائيل
.لا اعتراف بإسرائيل

Translation:

No peace with Israel,
No negotiation with Israel,
No recognition of Israel.

— "The Three Noes", Khartoum Resolution, 1967

The summit was held to discuss strategies for recouping the countries' lost territories from Israel in the Six-Day War. The attendees convened on 29 August, who were the heads of state of the United Arab Republic, Saudi Arabia, Sudan, Jordan, Lebanon, Kuwait, and Yemen, and prime ministers from Morocco, Libya, Tunisia and Algeria. Syria did not attend the summit, though the Syrian foreign minister, Ibrahim Makhous, attended the foreign ministers' conference that preceded the summit. The resolutions reached at the summit included the economic assistance of Egypt and Jordan, the ending of the oil boycott against Western countries and a new agreement to end the war in Yemen. In the end, the countries agreed to the Khartoum Resolution, which were the seven headline agreements made between the countries, with the third being the most notable, known as the "three noes": "No peace with Israel, No negotiation with Israel, No recognition of Israel". This clause influenced the foreign policy of the Arab countries and Israel for decades hence.

== Resolutions ==
The text of the Khartoum Resolution was as follows:

1. The conference has affirmed the unity of Arab states, the unity of joint action and the need for coordination and for the elimination of all differences. The Kings, Presidents and representatives of the other Arab Heads of State at the conference have affirmed their countries' stand by an implementation of the Arab Solidarity Charter which was signed at the third Arab summit conference in Casablanca.
2. The conference has agreed on the need to consolidate all efforts to eliminate the effects of the aggression on the basis that the occupied lands are Arab lands and that the burden of regaining these lands falls on all the Arab States.
3. The Arab Heads of State have agreed to unite their political efforts at the international and diplomatic level to eliminate the effects of the aggression and to ensure the withdrawal of the aggressive Israeli forces from the Arab lands which have been occupied since the aggression of 5 June. This will be done within the framework of the main principles by which the Arab States abide, namely, no peace with Israel, no recognition of Israel, no negotiations with it, and insistence on the rights of the Palestinian people in their own country.
4. The conference of Arab Ministers of Finance, Economy and Oil recommended that suspension of oil pumping be used as a weapon in the battle. However, after thoroughly studying the matter, the summit conference has come to the conclusion that the oil pumping can itself be used as a positive weapon, since oil is an Arab resource which can be used to strengthen the economy of the Arab States directly affected by the aggression, so that these States will be able to stand firm in the battle. The conference has, therefore, decided to resume the pumping of oil, since oil is a positive Arab resource that can be used in the service of Arab goals. It can contribute to the efforts to enable those Arab States which were exposed to the aggression and thereby lost economic resources to stand firm and eliminate the effects of the aggression. The oil-producing States have, in fact, participated in the efforts to enable the States affected by the aggression to stand firm in the face of any economic pressure.
5. The participants in the conference have approved the plan proposed by Kuwait to set up an Arab Economic and Social Development Fund on the basis of the recommendation of the Baghdad conference of Arab Ministers of Finance, Economy and Oil.
6. The participants have agreed on the need to adopt the necessary measures to strengthen military preparation to face all eventualities.
7. The conference has decided to expedite the elimination of foreign bases in the Arab States.

=== Interpretations ===
Some have claimed the resolution is a total rejection of Israel's right to exist, as well as a rejection of any longstanding peace between Israel and Arab countries. The Palestine Liberation Organization (PLO) itself used the Khartoum Resolution to advocate against acceptance of Israel's right to exist as articulated in United Nations Security Council Resolution 242. Benny Morris wrote that the Arab leaders "hammered out a defiant, rejectionist platform that was to bedevil all peace moves in the region for a decade" despite an Israeli offer on 19 June 1967 "to give up Sinai and the Golan in exchange for peace." Odd Bull of the UNTSO opined in much the same manner in 1976. Some, however, have argued that Arab spokesmen interpreted the Khartoum declarations, though hostile towards Israel, to mean that Arab states will not formally normalise with Israel, but do not reject outright a de facto peace with them. Avi Shlaim and Fred Khouri argue that it represented a rejection of formal peace but allowed for indirect diplomacy and a de facto acceptance of Israel’s existence.

== Aftermath ==
The summit's headline resolution, the Khartoum resolution, was met with shock by Israeli officials.

The United Nations passed Resolution 242 in November 1967, which made the UN's official stance on the post-war Israeli occupation. It stressed that Israel should withdraw "from territories occupied in the recent conflict" to the countries that had them before. The phrase is interpreted by the Arab nations as requiring full withdrawal and by the United States and Israel as allowing for partial withdrawal in the context of peace agreements.
