= 1967 Oil Embargo =

Arab embargo during the Six-Day War

The 1967 Oil Embargo began on June 6, 1967, the second day of the Six-Day War, with a joint Arab decision to deter any countries from supporting Israel militarily. Several Middle Eastern countries eventually limited their oil shipments, some embargoing only the United States and the United Kingdom, while others placed a total ban on oil exports. The Oil Embargo did not significantly decrease the amount of oil available in the United States or any affected European countries, due mainly to a lack of solidarity and uniformity in embargoing specific countries. The embargo was effectively ended on September 1 with the issuance of the Khartoum Resolution.

== Oil Ministers' Conference ==
During the June 9–18 Oil Ministers' Conference in Baghdad, Iraq, several Arab countries issued a communiqué that two resolutions were unanimously passed:

1. "Arab oil shall be denied to and shall not be allowed to reach directly or indirectly countries committing aggression or participating in aggression on sovereignty of any Arab state or its territories or its territorial waters, particularly the Gulf of Aqaba"
2. "The involvement of any country directly or indirectly in armed aggression against Arab states will make assets of its companies and nationals inside the territories of Arab countries subject to the laws of war. This includes the assets of oil companies."

Invitees included Egypt, Syria, Kuwait, Libya, Saudi Arabia, Algeria, Bahrain, Abu Dhabi, and Qatar. Iraq sent copies of the Council resolution to the Embassies of Iran and Indonesia, and sought the support of Venezuela.

== Oil Embargo ==
The Baghdad Resolutions were important because Egypt broadcast claims of US aircraft support on June 6. Iraq was the first country to limit its oil shipments, embargoing the United States and the United Kingdom on June 6. Iraq, Kuwait, Algeria, and Bahrain eventually embargoed the United States and the United Kingdom. Syria stopped all oil exports, rather than just embargoing specific countries, in order to avoid declaring specific nations as aggressors.

The United States advocated emergency measures in OECD meetings and supported the establishment of an International Industry Advisory Board. The Advisory Board was critical in efficiently apportioning limited tanker resources and managing the distribution of the limited oil resources. This was an effective measure to negate the oil embargo as there was no consensus on what countries to embargo, and more importantly, oil shipped to a European country could then be shipped to any of the embargoed countries. Some Arab countries encouraged the oil companies to circumvent the embargo, as the Amir of Kuwait even proposed to the US ambassador that companies simply alter shipping manifests to ship oil to prohibited countries.

Egypt sought to bend not only international political policy but also the policies of more moderate governments, and sought to export the socialist revolution to neighboring moderate (i.e. conservative) countries. The embargo resulted in public pressure on Middle Eastern leaders to support Arab solidarity. Nasser effectively limited moderate countries' political options lest they risk a revolution.

== Khartoum Resolution ==
The Khartoum Resolution issued on September 1 allowed the moderate oil-producing nations (Kuwait, Saudi Arabia, and Libya) to resume oil exports and regain this critical source of revenue without risking disquiet or even overthrow from their more radical citizens. In exchange, these countries agreed to give annual aid to "victims of Zionist aggression", namely Egypt and Jordan ($266 million and $112 million, respectively).

The 1967 oil embargo was the main reason for the formation of OAPEC, which would provide a forum for the discussion of using oil politically. The organization's next embargo had a much stronger impact, triggering the oil crisis of 1973–74.

== See also ==
- Boycott
