= Jarring Mission =

Peace efforts to resolve Israeli and Arab conflict after the Six-Day War

The Jarring Mission refers to efforts undertaken by Gunnar Jarring to achieve a peaceful settlement of the conflict between Israel and its Arab neighbors after the Six-Day War in 1967.

== History ==
Jarring was appointed on 23 November 1967 by UN Secretary-General, U Thant, as Special Envoy under the terms of UN Security Council Resolution 242 to negotiate the implementation of the resolution.

The governments of Israel, Egypt, Jordan, and Lebanon recognized Jarring's appointment and agreed to participate in his shuttle diplomacy although they differed on key points of interpretation of the resolution. The government of Syria rejected Jarring's mission on grounds that total Israeli withdrawal was a prerequisite for further negotiations. After denouncing it in 1967, Syria "conditionally" accepted the resolution in March 1972.

Jarring's report was presented to the public on 4 January 1971. On 8 February, he submitted to the Egyptian and Israeli governments his most detailed plan for an Egyptian-Israeli peace treaty. Egypt responded by stating that it would "only be willing to enter into a peace agreement with Israel" after Israel agreed to a set of seven terms including the "withdrawal of the Israeli armed forces from all the territories occupied since 5 June 1967." Israel responded that it "views favourably the expression by the UAR [the United Arab Republic was then the official name of Egypt] of its readiness to enter into a peace agreement with Israel and reiterates that it is prepared for meaningful negotiations on all subjects relevant to a peace agreement between the two countries." Another government statement said, "As its condition for peace, Egypt would have Israel restore its past territorial vulnerability. This Israel will never do."

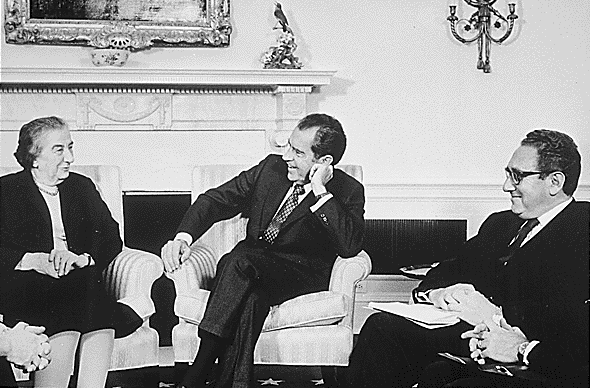
US President Richard Nixon and Israeli Prime Minister Golda Meir meeting on 1 March 1973 in the Oval Office. National Security Advisor Henry Kissinger is to the right of Nixon.

On 28 February 1973, during a visit in Washington, DC, Israeli Prime Minister Golda Meir agreed with the then U.S. National Security Advisor Henry Kissinger's peace proposal based on "security versus sovereignty" in which Israel would accept Egyptian sovereignty over all of the Sinai Peninsula, and Egypt would accept Israeli presence in some Sinai strategic positions. The talks continued under Jarring's auspices until 1973 but bore no results. After 1973, the Jarring Mission was replaced by bilateral and multilateral peace conferences.

The impasse in Jarring's efforts appears to be related to differing interpretations of the Security Council resolution. Israel insisted that any efforts should be undertaken with the goal of direct peace negotiations between Israel and the Arab states and that no territory concessions could be contemplated without the prospect of a lasting peace. The Arab states and the Soviet Union maintained that there would be no direct talks with Israel (in keeping with the Khartoum Resolution) and that withdrawals were a precondition for any further talks.

At the time of his appointment, Jarring was the Swedish ambassador to the Soviet Union, and he maintained his ambassadorship during the mission. Critics have since pointed out that Jarring had to manage a difficult conflict of interest since he had to maintain his duties as Swedish ambassador to the Soviet Union while he tried to facilitate talks in which the Soviet Union had its own interests.

An unpublished study, reported in 2010, of the Jarring Mission argued that Jarring's efforts actually paved the way for the future peace talks and so were more significant than is commonly assumed.
