= Khartoum Resolution =

1967 Arab League summit resolution

،لا صلح مع إسرائيل
،لا تفاوض مع إسرائيل
.لا اعتراف بإسرائيل

Translation:

No peace with Israel,
No negotiation with Israel,
No recognition of Israel.

— "The Three Noes", Khartoum Resolution, 1967

The Khartoum Resolution (Arabic: قرار الخرطوم) of 1 September 1967 was issued at the conclusion of the 1967 Arab League summit, which was convened in Khartoum, the capital of Sudan, in the wake of the Six-Day War. The resolution is famous for containing (in the third paragraph) what became known as the "Three Noes" (Arabic: اللاءات الثلاث) or "The Three Noes of Khartoum" (لاءات الخرطوم الثلاث).

== Resolution text ==
1. The conference has affirmed the unity of Arab states, the unity of joint action and the need for coordination and for the elimination of all differences. The Kings, Presidents and representatives of the other Arab Heads of State at the conference have affirmed their countries' stand by an implementation of the Arab Solidarity Charter which was signed at the third Arab summit conference in Casablanca.
2. The conference has agreed on the need to consolidate all efforts to eliminate the effects of the aggression on the basis that the occupied lands are Arab lands and that the burden of regaining these lands falls on all the Arab States.
3. The Arab Heads of State have agreed to unite their political efforts at the international and diplomatic level to eliminate the effects of the aggression and to ensure the withdrawal of the aggressive Israeli forces from the Arab lands which have been occupied since the aggression of 5 June. This will be done within the framework of the main principles by which the Arab States abide, namely, no peace with Israel, no recognition of Israel, no negotiations with it, and insistence on the rights of the Palestinian people in their own country.
4. The conference of Arab Ministers of Finance, Economy and Oil recommended that suspension of oil pumping be used as a weapon in the battle. However, after thoroughly studying the matter, the summit conference has come to the conclusion that the oil pumping can itself be used as a positive weapon, since oil is an Arab resource which can be used to strengthen the economy of the Arab States directly affected by the aggression, so that these States will be able to stand firm in the battle. The conference has, therefore, decided to resume the pumping of oil, since oil is a positive Arab resource that can be used in the service of Arab goals. It can contribute to the efforts to enable those Arab States which were exposed to the aggression and thereby lost economic resources to stand firm and eliminate the effects of the aggression. The oil-producing States have, in fact, participated in the efforts to enable the States affected by the aggression to stand firm in the face of any economic pressure.
5. The participants in the conference have approved the plan proposed by Kuwait to set up an Arab Economic and Social Development Fund on the basis of the recommendation of the Baghdad conference of Arab Ministers of Finance, Economy and Oil.
6. The participants have agreed on the need to adopt the necessary measures to strengthen military preparation to face all eventualities.
7. The conference has decided to expedite the elimination of foreign bases in the Arab States.

== Interpretations ==
Commentators have frequently presented the resolution as an example of Arab rejectionism. Abd al Azim Ramadan stated that the Khartoum decisions left only one option—war. Efraim Halevy, Guy Ben-Porat, Steven R. David, Julius Stone, and Ian Bremmer all agree the Khartoum Resolution amounted to a rejection of Israel's right to exist. The Palestine Liberation Organization (PLO) itself enlisted the Khartoum Resolution to advocate against acceptance of Israel's right to exist as articulated in United Nations Security Council Resolution 242. Benny Morris wrote that the Arab leaders "hammered out a defiant, rejectionist platform that was to bedevil all peace moves in the region for a decade" despite an Israeli offer on 19 June 1967 "to give up Sinai and the Golan in exchange for peace." Odd Bull of the UNTSO opined in much the same manner in 1976.

Avi Shlaim has argued that Arab spokesmen interpreted the Khartoum declarations to mean "no formal peace treaty, but not a rejection of peace; no direct negotiations, but not a refusal to talk through third parties; and no de jure recognition of Israel, but acceptance of its existence as a state" (emphasis in original). Shlaim states that the conference marked a turning point in Arab–Israeli relations by noting that Gamal Abdel Nasser urged Hussein of Jordan to seek a "comprehensive settlement" with Israel. Shlaim acknowledges that none of that was known in Israel at the time, whose leaders took the "Three Nos" at face value. Fred Khouri argued that "the Khartoum conference cleared the way for the Arab moderates to seek a political solution and to offer, in exchange for their conquered lands, important concessions short of actually recognizing Israel and negotiating formal peace treaties with her."

In the event, indirect negotiations between Israel, Jordan, Egypt and Syria eventually opened through the auspices of the Jarring Mission (1967–1973), and secret direct talks also took place between Israel and Jordan, but neither avenue succeeded in achieving a meaningful settlement, which set the stage for a new round of conflict.

An unpublished study, reported in 2010, of the Jarring Mission argued that Jarring's efforts actually paved the way for the future peace talks and so were more significant than is commonly assumed.

== See also ==
- Arab–Israeli conflict
- International law and the Arab–Israeli conflict
