= Odd Bull =

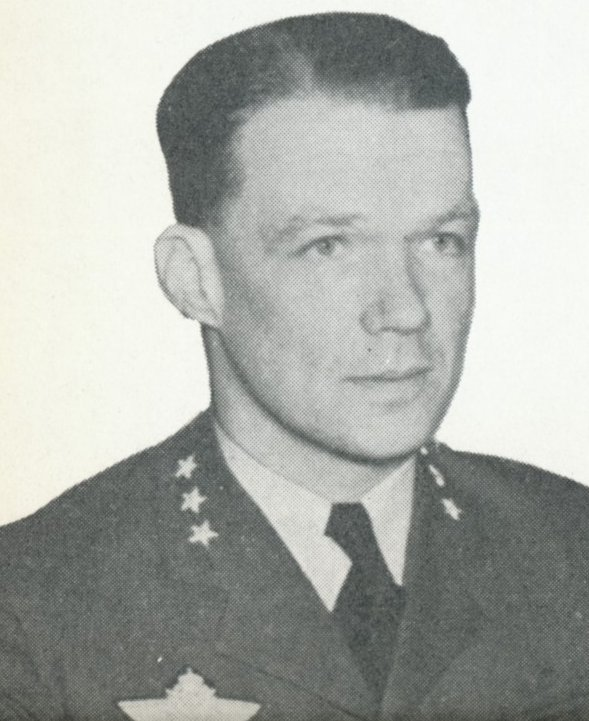
- Born: 28 June 1907
- Died: 8 September 1991 (aged 84)
- Military career
- Allegiance: Norway
- Branch: Royal Norwegian Air Force
- Service years: 1928–1969
- Rank: Lieutenant General
- Units: No. 242 Squadron RAF; No. 107 Squadron RAF
- Commands: United Nations Truce Supervision Organization; Chief of the Air Staff; No. 331 (Norwegian) Squadron RAF; No. 332 (Norwegian) Squadron RAF
- Conflicts: Second World War; Six-Day War
- Awards: Grand Cross of the Order of St. Olav

Lieutenant General Odd Bull (28 June 1907 – 8 September 1991) was a career officer in the Royal Norwegian Air Force who rose to the position of Chief of Air Staff. He is probably best known outside Norway for his role as Chief of Staff of the United Nations Truce Supervision Organization (UNTSO) between 1963 and 1970, a period which coincided with the Six-Day War between Israel and its Arab neighbours. He wrote a memoir of his experiences during this time, which was published as War and Peace in the Middle East: The Experiences and Views of a U.N. Observer.

== Early life ==
Odd Bull was born on June 28, 1907. He traces his family origins back to 1700 when the family patriarch, a ship's captain named Jacob Bull, first settled in Norway. Odd is a common Norwegian given name, and Bull is an Anglo-Saxon surname. Jacob Bull's descendants retained their seafaring connection until the arrival of Odd Bull's father Gjert, who did not go to sea but became manager of a tobacco factory instead.

Bull grew up in Oslo and received the first twelve years of his education at Vestheim School. At his leaving examination in 1925, he did worse than expected and decided to spend twelve months at a military academy. He enjoyed the experience so much that he eventually decided to take the two-year officer training course, graduating in 1928 as a first lieutenant in the 4th Infantry Division. During his training however, he had become interested in flying, and in 1929 he applied and was accepted into the Army Flying School. After two years of flying experience he became a flying instructor in 1931.

== World War II ==
In April 1940, Nazi Germany invaded Norway. Taken by surprise, the Norwegians were unable to mobilize their armed forces in time to conduct an effective defence and were conquered in a 62-day campaign. Many Norwegian servicemen, including Bull, escaped by boat to the United Kingdom where they hoped to carry on the struggle.

Once in Britain, Bull attempted to organize some Norwegian air squadrons, but no airfields were available. Eventually however, the Canadian government offered the Norwegians the Toronto Island Airport as a training centre. As word got out about the centre, hundreds of Norwegians from around the world made their way to Canada to train as pilots.

In 1941, Bull returned to Britain to fly with No. 242 Squadron RAF, but he along with a number of other Norwegian pilots were keen to form a Norwegian squadron, which they achieved in July of the same year. The Norwegian unit was assigned to provide fighter cover for Scapa Flow, but Bull was then recalled to the Toronto training camp in Canada to become Camp Commandant.

Bull was eventually reassigned to combat duty, flying Mosquitoes with No. 107 Squadron RAF during the D-Day landings in Northern France. With the liberation of Norway in May 1945, he returned to his home country. Bull noted that of the 750 Norwegians who joined the Allied air forces, 278, or more than one in three, were killed – 203 in battle and 75 in training or other accidents.

== Post-war ==
=== Norwegian service ===
After the war, Bull was made head of one of Norway's four regional commands. He later served as Chief of Staff to the Commander of the Air Force. In 1960, he was appointed Chief of Air Staff.

Bull was decorated with the Grand Cross of the Order of St. Olav in 1970.

=== Service with UNTSO ===
In 1958 Bull was offered a temporary position with the United Nations Observation Group in Lebanon (UNOGIL) in Lebanon, which he accepted. Bull's appointment coincided with the Lebanon Crisis (to which he devotes a chapter of his memoir). He returned to Norway in 1959, but in 1963 he was offered the position as Chief of Staff of the United Nations Truce Supervision Organization (UNTSO), which he again accepted. UNTSO's task at this time was to monitor the borders between Israel and its Arab neighbours and to mediate disputes between them. Bull's appointment came at a time of rising tensions, particularly between Israel and Syria, which both laid claim to territories inside the demilitarized zones. These tensions led to the Six-Day War in 1967. As Chief of Staff of UNTSO, Bull was in a position to closely observe the development of the conflict and its aftermath. He would later author a book about his experiences during this time, entitled War and Peace in the Middle East: The Experiences and Views of a UN Observer.

Bull gave an explanation for his writing of the book:

Many people have from time to time urged me to write my memoirs, but I only decided to do so when I came back to Norway at Christmas, 1967, and found that Norwegian public opinion there regarded the Palestine problem almost entirely from the Israeli point of view. As this was a problem with which I had been living for many years, and one which, as I had become very much aware, had at least two sides to it, I felt in conscience bound to make my own experience the basis for as calm and objective a presentation of the whole Middle East situation as I could. For those from outside who, like myself, have become involved in this situation, the aim must always be to try to reduce the burden of suffering and injustice for all people in that area, Arabs and Israelis alike.

Bull's retirement from the position as Chief of Staff of UNTSO was noted by the Jerusalem Post in the following terms:

General Bull has earned our respect for his integrity, honesty and objectivity. A calm personality, the former Commander of the Norwegian Air Force ... was able to quickly re-establish confidence and develop effective working relations with the Israeli Army and Foreign Ministry. ... He consistently stayed out of the limelight, refusing press and television interviews. ... The Arab States could never muster the same enthusiasm for General Bull as for his predecessors, but despite Israel's appreciation of his work they were never heard to object to any of his efforts or to complain of his attitude. Israel regrets having to bid goodbye to this untypical representative of the United Nations. ... Israelis wish General Bull a much earned rest and to know that he will be remembered with appreciation and gratitude.

Military offices
Preceded by Carl von Horn	Chief of Staff, United Nations Truce Supervision Organization; 1963–1970	Succeeded by Ensio Siilasvuo
