= United Nations Security Council Resolution 242 =

1967 resolution on withdrawal of Israel and recognition of boundaries

UN Security Council Resolution 242
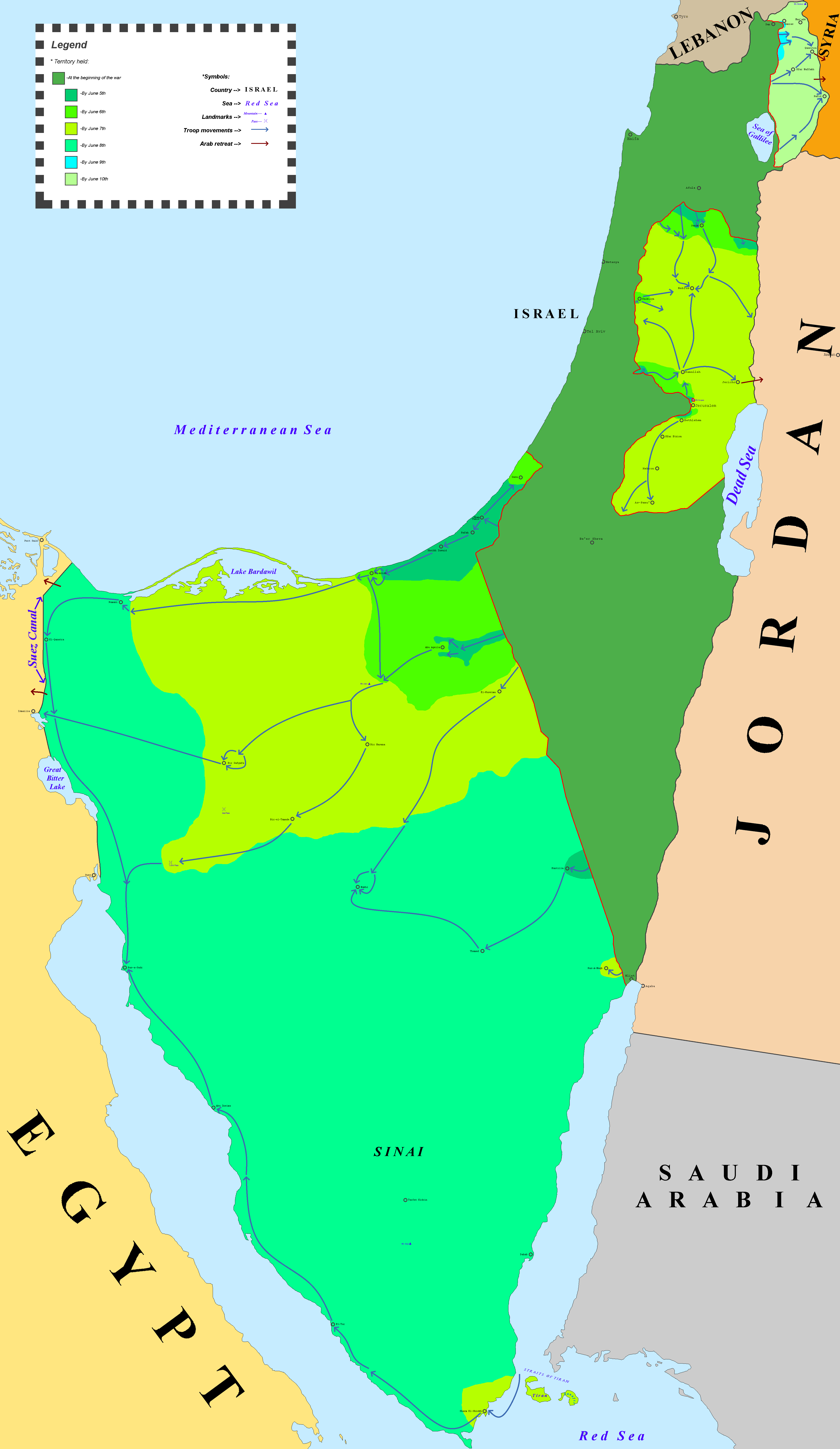
- Territories occupied by Israel during the Six-Day War, including the Sinai
- Date: 22 November 1967
- Meeting no.: 1,382
- Code: S/RES/242 (1967) (Document)
- Subject: Territories occupied by Israel
- Voting summary: 15 voted for; None voted against; None abstained
- Result: Unanimously approved

Security Council composition
- Permanent members: China; France; Soviet Union; United Kingdom; United States
- Non-permanent members: Argentina; Brazil; Bulgaria; Canada; Denmark; Ethiopia; India; Japan; Mali; Nigeria

United Nations Security Council Resolution 242 (S/RES/242) was adopted unanimously by the UN Security Council on 22 November 1967, in the aftermath of the Six-Day War. It was adopted under Chapter VI of the UN Charter. The resolution was sponsored by British ambassador Lord Caradon and was one of five drafts under consideration.

The preamble refers to the "inadmissibility of the acquisition of territory by war and the need to work for a just and lasting peace in the Middle East in which every State in the area can live in security".

Operative Paragraph One "Affirms that the fulfillment of Charter principles requires the establishment of a just and lasting peace in the Middle East which should include the application of both the following principles:

(i) Withdrawal of Israeli armed forces from territories occupied in the recent conflict;

(ii) Termination of all claims or states of belligerency and respect for and acknowledgment of the sovereignty, territorial integrity and political independence of every State in the area and their right to live in peace within secure and recognized boundaries free from threats or acts of force."

Egypt, Jordan, Israel and Lebanon entered into consultations with the UN Special representative over the implementation of 242. After denouncing it in 1967, Syria "conditionally" accepted the resolution in March 1972. Syria formally accepted UN Security Council Resolution 338, the cease-fire at the end of the Yom Kippur War (in 1973), which embraced Resolution 242.

On 1 May 1968, the Israeli ambassador to the UN expressed Israel's position to the Security Council: "My government has indicated its acceptance of the Security Council resolution for the promotion of agreement on the establishment of a just and lasting peace. I am also authorized to reaffirm that we are willing to seek agreement with each Arab State on all matters included in that resolution."

Resolution 242 is one of the most widely affirmed resolutions on the Arab–Israeli conflict and formed the basis for later negotiations between the parties. These led to peace treaties between Israel and Egypt (1979) and Jordan (1994), as well as the 1993 and 1995 agreements with the Palestinians.

== Context ==
The resolution is the formula proposed by the Security Council for the resolution of the Arab–Israeli conflict, in particular, ending the state of belligerency then existing between the 'States concerned', Israel and Egypt, Jordan, Syria and Lebanon. The resolution deals with five principles; withdrawal of Israeli forces, 'peace within secure and recognized boundaries', freedom of navigation, a just settlement of the refugee problem and security measures including demilitarized zones. It also provided for the appointment of a Special Representative to proceed to the Middle East in order to promote agreement on a peaceful and accepted settlement in accordance with the principles outlined in the resolution.

Upon presenting the draft resolution to the Security Council, the U.K. representative Lord Caradon said:

All of us recognize that peace is the prize. None of us wishes a temporary truce or a superficial accommodation. We could never advocate a return to uneasy hostility. As I have said, my Government would never wish to be associated with any so-called settlement which was only a continuation of a false truce, and all of us without any hesitation at all can agree that we seek a settlement within the principles laid down in Article 2 of the Charter. So much for the preamble.

As to the first operative paragraph, and with due respect for fulfillment of Charter principles, we consider it essential that there should be applied the principles of both withdrawal and security, and we have no doubt that the words set out throughout that paragraph are perfectly clear.

As to the second operative paragraph, there is I believe no vestige of disagreement between us all that there must be a guarantee of freedom of navigation through international waterways. There must be a just settlement of the refugee problem. There must be a guarantee and adequate means to ensure the territorial inviolability and political independence of every State in the area.

As to the third operative paragraph, I have said before that I consider that the United Nations special representative should be free to decide himself the exact means and methods by which he pursues his endeavors in contact with the States concerned both to promote agreement and to assist efforts to achieve a peaceful and accepted and final settlement."

United States Secretary of State Dean Rusk commented on the most significant area of disagreement regarding the resolution:

There was much bickering over whether that resolution should say from "the" territories or from "all" territories. In the French version, which is equally authentic, it says withdrawal de territory, with de meaning "the." We wanted that to be left a little vague and subject to future negotiation because we thought the Israeli border along the West Bank could be "rationalized"; certain anomalies could easily be straightened out with some exchanges of territory, making a more sensible border for all parties. We also wanted to leave open demilitarization measures in the Sinai and the Golan Heights and take a fresh look at the old city of Jerusalem. But we never contemplated any significant grant of territory to Israel as a result of the June 1967 war. On that point we and the Israelis to this day remain sharply divided. This situation could lead to real trouble in the future. Although every President since Harry Truman has committed the United States to the security and independence of Israel, I'm not aware of any commitment the United States has made to assist Israel in retaining territories seized in the Six-Day War.

A memorandum from the President's Special Assistant, Walt Rostow, to President Johnson said: "What's on the Arab Ambassadors' minds boils down to one big question: Will we make good on our pledge to support the territorial integrity of all states in the Middle East? Our best answer is that we stand by that pledge, but the only way to make good on it is to have a genuine peace. The tough question is whether we'd force Israel back to 4 June borders if the Arabs accepted terms that amounted to an honest peace settlement. Secretary Rusk told the Yugoslav Foreign Minister: 'The US had no problem with frontiers as they existed before the outbreak of hostilities. If we are talking about national frontiers—in a state of peace—then we will work toward restoring them.' But we all know that could lead to a tangle with the Israelis."

Rusk met with Foreign Minister Nikezic on 30 August 1967. However, according to telegram 30825 to Belgrade, 1 September, which summarizes the conversation, Rusk said the key to a settlement was to end the state of war and belligerence and that if a way could be found to deal with this, other things would fall into place; the difference between pre-5 June positions and secure national boundaries was an important difference.

President Johnson responded to a complaint from President Tito that Israel could change the frontiers without Arab consent: "You note that the Arabs feel the US interprets the draft resolution to imply a change of frontiers to their detriment. We have no preconceptions on frontiers as such. What we believe to be important is that the frontiers be secure. For this the single most vital condition is that they be acceptable to both sides. It is a source of regret to us that the Arabs appear to misunderstand our proposal and misread our motives."

Furthermore, Secretary Rusk's Telegram dated 2 March 1968, to the U.S. Interests Section of the Spanish Embassy in Cairo summarizing Undersecretary of State for Political Affairs Eugene Rostow’s conversation with Soviet Ambassador Anatoly Dobrynin states:

Rostow said ... resolution required agreement on "secure and recognized" boundaries, which, as practical matter, and as matter of interpreting resolution, had to precede withdrawals. Two principles were basic to Article I of resolution. Paragraph from which Dobrynin quoted was linked to others, and he did not see how anyone could seriously argue, in light of history of resolution in Security Council, withdrawal to borders of June 4th was contemplated. These words had been pressed on Council by Indians and others, and had not been accepted.

In an address delivered on 1 September 1982, President Ronald Reagan said:

In the pre-1967 borders Israel was barely 10 miles wide at its narrowest point. The bulk of Israel's population lived within artillery range of hostile Arab armies. I am not about to ask Israel to live that way again...

So the United States will not support the establishment of an independent Palestinian state in the West Bank and Gaza, and we will not support annexation or permanent control by Israel.

There is, however, another way to peace. The final status of these lands must, of course, be reached through the give-and-take of negotiations; but it is the firm view of the United States that self-government by the Palestinians of the West Bank and Gaza in association with Jordan offers the best chance for a durable, just and lasting peace.

It is the United States' position that – in return for peace – the withdrawal provision of Resolution 242 applies to all fronts, including the West Bank and Gaza.

When the border is negotiated between Jordan and Israel, our view on the extent to which Israel should be asked to give up territory will be heavily affected by the extent of true peace and normalization and the security arrangements offered in return.

Finally, we remain convinced that Jerusalem must remain undivided, but its final status should be decided through negotiations.

According to Michael Lynk, there are three schools of thought concerning the proper legal interpretation of the withdrawal phrase. Some of the parties involved have suggested that the indefinite language is a “perceptible loophole”, that authorizes “territorial revision” for Israel's benefit. Some have stated that the indefinite language was used to permit insubstantial and mutually beneficial alterations to the 1949 armistices lines, but that unilateral annexation of the captured territory was never authorized. Other parties have said that no final settlement obtained through force or the threat of force could be considered valid. They insist that the Security Council cannot create loopholes in peremptory norms of international law or the UN Charter, and that any use of indefinite language has to be interpreted in line with the overriding legal principles regarding the “inadmissibility of the acquisition of territory by war” and the prohibitions on mass deportations or displacement in connection with the settlement of the refugee problem.

Alexander Orakhelashvili says that the Security Council manifestly lacks the competence to validate agreements imposed through coercion, not least because the peremptory prohibition of the use of force is a limitation on the Council's powers and the voidness of coercively imposed treaties is the clear consequence of jus cogens and the conventional law as reflected in the Vienna Convention on the Law of Treaties. A recent South African study concluded that the ultimate status and boundaries will require negotiation between the parties, according to Security Council Resolutions 242 and 338. The same study also found that the provisions of the Fourth Geneva Convention which govern ‘special agreements’ that can adversely affect the rights of protected persons precludes any change in status of the territory obtained through an agreement concluded during a state of belligerent occupation.

== Content ==
=== Preamble ===
The second preambular reference states:

"Emphasizing the inadmissibility of the acquisition of territory by war and the need to work for a just and lasting peace in which every State in the area can live in security."

Srijita Jha and Akshadha Mishra said that "until 1945, annexation by conquest was a valid mode of acquisition of territory." Following World War I, Article 10 of the Covenant of the League of Nations limited (but did not eliminate) the concept of the right of conquest, that is, members of the League of Nations were not required to preserve "the territorial integrity and existing political independence" of a state engaging in a war of aggression. Since World War II, Article 2 of the Charter of the United Nations requires all members to "refrain in their international relations from the threat or use of force against the territorial integrity or political independence of any state, or in any other manner inconsistent with the purposes of the United Nations."

Michael Lynk says that article 2 of the Charter embodied a prevailing legal principle that there could be "no title by conquest". He says that principle had been expressed through numerous international conferences, doctrines, and treaties since the late 19th Century. Lynk cites the examples of the First International Conference of American States in 1890; the United States Stimson Doctrine of 1932; the 1932 League of Nations resolution on Japanese aggression in China; the Buenos Aires Declaration of 1936; and the Atlantic Charter of 1941. Surya Sharma says that under the UN Charter, a war in self-defense cannot result in the acquisition of title by conquest. He says that even if a war is lawful in origin it cannot exceed the limits of legitimate self-defense.

=== Land for peace ===
The resolution also calls for the implementation of the "land for peace" formula, calling for Israeli withdrawal from "territories" it had occupied in 1967 in exchange for peace with its neighbors. This was an important advance at the time, considering that there were no peace treaties between any Arab state and Israel until the Egypt–Israel peace treaty of 1979. "Land for peace" served as the basis of the Egypt–Israel Peace Treaty, in which Israel withdrew from the Sinai Peninsula (Egypt withdrew its claims to the Gaza Strip in favor of the Palestine Liberation Organization). Jordan renounced its claims regarding the West Bank in favor of the Palestine Liberation Organization, and has signed the Israel–Jordan peace treaty in 1994, that established the Jordan River as the boundary of Jordan.

Throughout the 1990s, there were Israeli-Syrian negotiations regarding a normalization of relations and an Israeli withdrawal from the Golan Heights. But a peace treaty was not made, mainly due to Syria's desire to recover and retain 25 square kilometers of territory in the Jordan River Valley which it seized in 1948 and occupied until 1967. As the United Nations recognizes only the 1948 borders, there is little support for the Syrian position outside the Arab bloc nor in resolving the Golan Heights issue.

The UN resolution does not specifically mention the Palestinians. The United Kingdom had recognized the union between the West Bank and Transjordan. Lord Caradon said that the parties assumed that withdrawal from occupied territories as provided in the resolution was applicable to East Jerusalem. "Nevertheless so important is the future of Jerusalem that it might be argued that we should have specifically dealt with that issue in the 1967 Resolution. It is easy to say that now, but I am quite sure that if we had attempted to raise or settle the question of Jerusalem as a separate issue at that time our task in attempting to find a unanimous decision would have been far greater if not impossible."

Judge Higgins of the International Court of Justice explained "from Security Council resolution 242 (1967) through to Security Council Resolution 1515 (2003), the key underlying requirements have remained the same – that Israel is entitled to exist, to be recognized, and to security, and that the Palestinian people are entitled to their territory, to exercise self-determination, and to have their own State. Security Council resolution 1515 (2003) envisages that these long-standing obligations are to be secured (...) by negotiation"

The United States Secretary of State Madeleine Albright told the U.N. Security Council in 1994 that "We simply do not support the description of the territories occupied by Israel in 1967 as 'Occupied Palestinian Territory'. In the view of my Government, this language could be taken to indicate sovereignty, a matter which both Israel and the PLO have agreed must be decided in negotiations on the final status of the territories. Had this language appeared in the operative paragraphs of the resolution, let me be clear: we would have exercised our veto. In fact, we are today voting against a resolution in the Commission on the Status of Women precisely because it implies that Jerusalem is 'occupied Palestinian territory'."

The Palestinians were represented by the Palestine Liberation Organization in negotiations leading to the Oslo Accords. They envisioned a 'permanent settlement based on Security Council Resolution 242'. The main premise of the Oslo Accords was the eventual creation of Palestinian autonomy in some or all of the territories captured during the Six-Day War, in return for Palestinian recognition of Israel. However, the Foreign Minister of the Palestinian Authority, Nabil Shaath, said: "Whether a state is announced now or after liberation, its borders must be those of 4 June 1967. We will not accept a state without borders or with borders based on UN Resolution 242, which we believe is no longer suitable. On the contrary, Resolution 242 has come to be used by Israel as a way to procrastinate."

The Security Council subsequently adopted resolution 1515 (2003), which recalled resolution 242 and endorsed the Middle East Quartet's Road Map towards a permanent, two-State solution to the Israeli–Palestinian conflict. The Quartet Plan calls for direct, bilateral negotiations as part of a comprehensive resolution of the Arab–Israeli conflict, on the basis of UN Security Council Resolutions 242, 338, 1397, 1515, 1850, and the Madrid principles. The Quartet has reiterated that the only viable solution to the Israeli–Palestinian conflict is an agreement that ends the occupation that began in 1967; resolves all permanent status issues as previously defined by the parties; and fulfils the aspirations of both parties for independent homelands through two states for two peoples, Israel and an independent, contiguous and viable state of Palestine, living side by side in peace and security.

On 14 April 2004, US President George W. Bush said to Israeli Prime Minister Ariel Sharon, "The United States reiterates its steadfast commitment to Israel's security, including secure, defensible borders." Israeli officials argue that the pre-1967 armistice line is not a defensible border, since Israel would be nine miles wide at the thinnest point, subjected to rocket fire from the highlands of the West Bank, and unable to stop smuggling from Jordan across the Jordan Valley. Thus, Israeli officials have been arguing for the final-status borders to be readjusted to reflect security concerns.

Resolution 1860 (2009) recalled resolution 242 and stressed that the Gaza Strip constitutes an integral part of the territory occupied in 1967 that will be a part of the Palestinian state.

=== Settlement of the refugee problem ===
The resolution advocates a "just settlement of the refugee problem". Lord Caradon said "It has been said that in the Resolution we treated Palestinians only as refugees, but this is unjustified. We provided that Israel should withdraw from occupied territories and it was together with that requirement for a restoration of Arab territory that we also called for a settlement of the refugee problem." Upon the adoption of Resolution 242, French President Charles de Gaulle stressed this principle during a press conference on 27 November 1967, and confirmed it in his letter of 9 January 1968, to David Ben-Gurion. De Gaulle cited "the pitiful condition of the Arabs who had sought refuge in Jordan or were relegated to Gaza" and stated that provided Israel withdrew her forces, it appeared it would be possible to reach a solution "within the framework of the United Nations that included the assurance of a dignified and fair future for the refugees and minorities in the Middle East."

Alexander Orakhelashvili said that ‘Just settlement’ can only refer to a settlement guaranteeing the return of displaced Palestinians. He explained that it must be presumed that the Council did not adopt decisions that validated mass deportation or displacement, since expulsion or deportation are crimes against humanity or an exceptionally serious war crime.

According to M. Avrum Ehrlich, 'Resolution 242 called for "a just solution to the refugee problem," a term covering Jewish refugees from Arab countries as stated by President Carter in 1978 at Camp David'.

According to John Quigley, however, it is clear from the context in which it was adopted, and from the statements recounted by the delegates, that Resolution 242 contemplates the Palestine Arab refugees only.

Arthur Goldberg, the United States ambassador to the U.N. at the time, wrote on the 20th anniversary that the "language presumably refers both to Arab and Jewish refugees".

== French version vs. English version of text ==
The English version of the clause:

Withdrawal of Israeli armed forces from territories occupied in the recent conflict

is given in French as:

Retrait des forces armées israéliennes des territoires occupés lors du récent conflit.

The difference between the two versions lies in the absence of a definite article ("the") in the English version, while the word "des" present in the French version in the expression "des territoires occupés" can only mean "from the occupied territories" (the "des" in front of "territoires occupés" can only be the contraction "from the" because of the use of the word "retrait" which entails an object – "des forces israéliennes" where the "des" is the contraction of "of the" (of the Israeli forces) and a location "des territoires occupés" where "des" is the contraction of "from the" (from the occupied territories)). If the meaning of "from some occupied territories" were intended, the only way to say so in French would have been "de territoires occupés".

Although some have dismissed the controversy by suggesting that the use of the word "des" in the French version is a translation error and should therefore be ignored in interpreting the document, the debate has retained its force since both versions are of equal legal force, as recognized languages of the United Nations and in international law.

Eugene V. Rostow says that the ambiguity was "fully and carefully considered and fully understood" in the debates of the council, and that the omission of the word "the" was intentional. To support his argument, he brings to attention the two resolutions that failed to pass, one Soviet and one Indian, who specified that Israel must retreat from all territories. He asserts that "In the end, the Council agreed unanimously on the British draft, knowing exactly what it meant," that is, that it meant to allow modifications of the pre-67 borders. His article also brings to light that when the U.S. and UK governments raised the issues with the French text in front of the French government and UN secretariat, the latter said that the French language offered 'no other solution for the problem.' Rostow added that "Since the question had been debated so long and so intensively and the decision of the Council was so clear, the matter was dropped, especially since none of the people involved could think of a more accurate French translation [of the English text]."

Solicitor John McHugo, a partner at Trowers & Hamlins and a visiting fellow at the Scottish Centre for International Law at Edinburgh University, draws a comparison to phrases such as:

Dogs must be kept on the lead near ponds in the park.

In spite of the lack of definite articles, according to McHugo, it is clear that such an instruction cannot legitimately be taken to imply that some dogs need not be kept on the lead or that the rule applies only near some ponds. Further, McHugo points out a potential consequence of the logic employed by advocates of a "some" reading. Paragraph 2 (a) of the resolution, which guarantees "freedom of navigation through international waterways in the area," may allow Arab states to interfere with navigation through some international waterways of their choosing.

Glenn Perry asserts that because the French version resolves ambiguities in the English text, and is more consistent with the other clauses of the treaty, it is the correct interpretation. He argues that "it is an accepted rule that the various language versions must be considered together, with the ambiguities of one version elucidated by the other". He cites Article 33 of the Vienna Convention on the Law of Treaties, which states that except when a treaty provides that one text shall prevail "the meaning which best reconciles the texts, having regard to the object and purpose of the treaty, shall be adopted". He furthermore argues that the context of the passage, in a treaty that reaffirms "'territorial integrity', 'territorial inviolability,' and 'the inadmissibility of the acquisition of territory by war' – taken together cannot be reconciled with anything less than full withdrawal". He argues that the reference to "secure and recognized borders" can be interpreted in several ways, and only one of them contradicts the principle of full withdrawal.

Shabtai Rosenne, former Permanent Representative of Israel to the United Nations Office at Geneva and member of the UN's International Law Commission, wrote that:

It is a historical fact, which nobody has ever attempted to deny, that the negotiations between the members of the Security Council, and with the other interested parties, which preceded the adoption of that resolution, were conducted on the basis of English texts, ultimately consolidated in Security Council document S/8247. [...] Many experts in the French language, including academics with no political axe to grind, have advised that the French translation is an accurate and idiomatic rendering of the original English text, and possibly even the only acceptable rendering into French.

Only English and French were the Security Council's working languages (Arabic, Russian, Spanish and Chinese were official but not the working languages).

David A. Korn asserts that this was indeed the position held by the United States and United Kingdom:

... both the British and the Americans pointed out that 242 was a British resolution; therefore, the English language text was authoritative and would prevail in any dispute over interpretation.

The French representative to the Security Council, in the debate immediately after the vote, asserted (in the official translation from French):

the French text, which is equally authentic with the English, leaves no room for any ambiguity, since it speaks of withdrawal "des territoires occupés," which indisputably corresponds to the expression "occupied territories". We were likewise gratified to hear the United Kingdom representative stress the link between this paragraph of his resolution and the principle of inadmissibility of the acquisition of territories by force...

Opponents of the "all territories" reading remind that the UN Security Council declined to adopt a draft resolution, including the definite article, far prior to the adoption of Resolution 242. They argue that, in interpreting a resolution of an international organization, one must look to the process of the negotiation and adoption of the text. This would make the text in English, the language of the discussion, take precedence.

== The negotiating and drafting process ==
A Congressional Research Service (CRS) Issue Brief quotes policy statements made by President Johnson in a speech delivered on 10 September 1968, and by Secretary of State Rogers in a speech delivered on 9 December 1969: "The United States has stated that boundaries should be negotiated and mutually recognized, 'should not reflect the weight of conquest,' and that adjustments in the pre-1967 boundaries should be 'insubstantial.'"

President Carter asked for a State Department report "to determine if there was any justice to the Israeli position that the resolution did not include all the occupied territories". The State Department report concluded:

Support for the concept of total withdrawal was widespread in the Security Council, and it was only through intensive American efforts that a resolution was adopted which employed indefinite language in the withdrawal clause. In the process of obtaining this result, the United States made clear to the Arab states and several other members of the Security Council that the United States envisioned only insubstantial revisions of the 1949 armistice lines. Israel did not protest the approach.

Ruth Lapidoth describes the view, adopted by Israel, which holds that the resolution allowed Israel to retain "some territories". She argues "The provision on the establishment of “secure and recognized boundaries” would have been meaningless if there had been an obligation to withdraw from all the territories. U.S. Secretary of State Henry Kissinger recalled the first time he heard someone invoke "the sacramental language of United Nations Security Council Resolution 242, mumbling about the need for a just and lasting peace within secure and recognized borders". He said the phrase was so platitudinous that he thought the speaker was pulling his leg. Kissinger said that, at that time, he did not appreciate how the flood of words used to justify the various demands obscured rather than illuminated the fundamental positions. Kissinger said those "clashing perspectives" prevented any real bargaining and explained:

Jordan’s acquiescence in Resolution 242 had been obtained in 1967 by the promise of our United Nations Ambassador Arthur Goldberg that under its terms we would work for the return of the West Bank of Jordan with minor boundary rectifications and that we were prepared to use our influence to obtain a role for Jordan in Jerusalem.

However, speaking to Henry Kissinger, President Richard Nixon said "You and I both know they can’t go back to the other [1967] borders. But we must not, on the other hand, say that because the Israelis win this war, as they won the '67 War, that we just go on with status quo. It can't be done." Kissinger replied "I couldn't agree more"

Moreover, President Gerald Ford said: "The U.S. further supports the position that a just and lasting peace, which remains our objective, must be acceptable to both sides. The U.S. has not developed a final position on the borders. Should it do so it will give great weight to Israel's position that any peace agreement with Syria must be predicated on Israel remaining on the Golan Heights."

Furthermore, Secretary of State George Shultz declared: "Israel will never negotiate from, or return to, the lines of partition or to the 1967 borders." Secretary of State Christopher's letter to Netanyahu states: "I would like to reiterate our position that Israel is entitled to secure and defensible borders, which should be directly negotiated and agreed with its neighbors."

A key part of the case in favour of a "some territories" reading is the claim that British and American officials involved in the drafting of the resolution omitted the definite article deliberately in order to make it less demanding on the Israelis. As George Brown, British Foreign Secretary in 1967, said:

The Israelis had by now annexed de facto, if not formally, large new areas of Arab land, and there were now very many more Arab refugees. It was clear that what Israel or at least many of her leaders, really wanted was permanently to colonize much of this newly annexed Arab territory, particularly the Jordan valley, Jerusalem, and other sensitive areas. This led me into a flurry of activity at the United Nations, which resulted in the near miracle of getting the famous resolution – Resolution 242 – unanimously adopted by the Security Council. It declares "the inadmissibility of territory by war" and it also affirms the necessity "for guaranteeing the territorial inviolability and political independence of every state in the area". It calls for "withdrawal of Israeli forces from territories occupied during the recent conflict." It does not call for Israeli withdrawal from “the” territories recently occupied, nor does it use the word “all”. It would have been impossible to get the resolution through if either of these words had been included, but it does set out the lines on which negotiations for a settlement must take place. Each side must be prepared to give up something: the resolution doesn’t attempt to say precisely what, because that is what negotiations for a peace-treaty must be about.

Lord Caradon, chief author of the resolution, takes a subtly different slant. His focus seems to be that the lack of a definite article is intended to deny permanence to the "unsatisfactory" pre-1967 border, rather than to allow Israel to retain land taken by force. Border rectification by mutual agreement is allowed:

Knowing as I did the unsatisfactory nature of the 1967 line I was not prepared to use wording in the Resolution which would have made that line permanent. Nevertheless it is necessary to say again that the overriding principle was the "inadmissibility of the acquisition of territory by war" and that meant that there could be no justification for annexation of territory on the Arab side of the 1967 line merely because it had been conquered in the 1967 war. The sensible way to decide permanent "secure and recognized" boundaries would be to set up a Boundary Commission and hear both sides and then to make impartial recommendations for a new frontier line, bearing in mind, of course, the "inadmissibility" principle.

Q. But how would one change the previous border without the acquisition of territory by war? Are you suggesting mutual concessions, that is, that both Israel and the Arabs would rationalize the border by yielding up small parcels of territory? A. Yes, I'm suggesting that... Q. And that this should be mutually done, with mutual territorial concessions? A. Yes, yes. To the benefit of all.

Arthur J. Goldberg, another of the resolution's drafters, argued that Resolution 242 does not dictate the extent of the withdrawal, and added that this matter should be negotiated between the parties:

Does Resolution 242 as unanimously adopted by the UN Security Council require the withdrawal of Israeli armed forces from all of the territories occupied by Israel during the 1967 war? The answer is no. In the resolution, the words the and all are omitted. Resolution 242 calls for the withdrawal of Israeli armed forces from territories occupied in the 1967 conflict, without specifying the extent of the withdrawal. The resolution, therefore, neither commands nor prohibits total withdrawal. If the resolution is ambiguous, and purposely so, on this crucial issue, how is the withdrawal issue to be settled? By direct negotiations between the concerned parties. Resolution 242 calls for agreement between them to achieve a peaceful and accepted settlement. Agreement and acceptance necessarily require negotiations.

Mr. Michael Stewart, Secretary of State for Foreign and Commonwealth Affairs, in a reply to a question in Parliament, 9 December 1969: "As I have explained before, there is reference, in the vital United Nations Security Council Resolution, both to withdrawal from territories and to secure and recognized boundaries. As I have told the House previously, we believe that these two things should be read concurrently and that the omission of the word 'all' before the word 'territories' is deliberate."

Mr. Joseph J. Sisco, Assistant Secretary of State, 12 July 1970 (NBC "Meet the Press"): "That Resolution did not say 'withdrawal to the pre-June 5 lines'. The Resolution said that the parties must negotiate to achieve agreement on the so-called final secure and recognized borders. In other words, the question of the final borders is a matter of negotiations between the parties." Mr. Sisco was actively involved in drafting the resolution in his capacity as Assistant Secretary of State for International Organization Affairs in 1967.

President Lyndon B. Johnson:

Fifth, the crisis underlines the importance of respect for political independence and territorial integrity of all the states of the area. We reaffirmed that principle at the height of this crisis. We reaffirm it again today on behalf of all.

This principle can be effective in the Middle East only on the basis of peace between the parties. The nations of the region have had only fragile and violated truce lines for 20 years. What they now need are recognized boundaries and other arrangements that will give them security against terror, destruction, and war.

There are some who have urged, as a single, simple solution, an immediate return to the situation as it was on June 4. As our distinguished and able Ambassador, Mr. Arthur Goldberg, has already said, this is not a prescription for peace but for renewed hostilities. Certainly troops must be withdrawn, but there must also be recognized rights of national life, progress in solving the refugee problem, freedom of innocent maritime passage, limitation of the arms race, and respect for political independence and territorial integrity."

=== U.S. position ===
On 19 June 1967, President Johnson declared the five principles, including land for peace, that he believed comprised the components of any United Nations settlement of the Middle East crisis. He pledged the U.S. Government would "do its part for peace in every forum, at every level, at every hour". On 12 July 1967, Secretary of State Rusk announced that the U.S. position on the Near East crisis was outlined in the President's statement of 19 June and that it provided the basis for a just and equitable settlement between the Arab states and Israel. On 16 August 1967, the Israeli Foreign Office stated that Israel agreed with the principles set forth by the President on 19 June and indicated that no resolution would be acceptable if it deviated from them.

On 9 June 1967, Israeli Foreign Minister Eban assured Arthur Goldberg, US Ambassador to the UN, that Israel was not seeking territorial aggrandizement and had no "colonial" aspirations. Secretary of State Rusk stressed to the Government of Israel that no settlement with Jordan would be accepted by the world community unless it gave Jordan some special position in the Old City of Jerusalem. The US also assumed Jordan would receive the bulk of the West Bank as that was regarded as Jordanian territory.

On 3 November 1967, Ambassador Goldberg, accompanied by Mr. Sisco and Mr. Pedersen, called on King Hussein of Jordan. Goldberg said the US was committed to the principle of political independence and territorial integrity and was ready to reaffirm it bilaterally and publicly in the Security Council resolution. Goldberg said the US believes in territorial integrity, withdrawal, and recognition of secure boundaries. Goldberg said the principle of territorial integrity has two important sub-principles: there must be a withdrawal to recognized and secure frontiers for all countries, not necessarily the old armistice lines, and there must be mutuality in adjustments.

Walt Rostow advised President Johnson that Secretary Rusk had explained to Mr. Eban that US support for secure permanent frontiers does not mean the US supports territorial changes. The record of a meeting between Under Secretary of State Eugene Rostow and Israeli Ambassador Harmon stated that Rostow made clear the US view that there should be movement from General Armistice Agreements to conditions of peace and that this would involve some adjustments of armistice lines as foreseen in the Armistice Agreements. Rostow told Harmon that he had already stressed to Foreign Minister Eban that the US expected the thrust of the settlement would be toward security and demilitarization arrangements rather than toward major changes in the Armistice lines. Harmon said the Israeli position was that Jerusalem should be an open city under unified administration but that the Jordanian interest in Jerusalem could be met through arrangements including "sovereignty". Rostow said the US government assumed (and Harman confirmed) that despite public statements to the contrary, the Government of Israel position on Jerusalem was that which Eban, Harman, and Evron had given several times, that Jerusalem was negotiable.

Ambassador Goldberg briefed King Hussein on US assurances regarding territorial integrity. Goldberg said the US did not view Jordan as a country that consisted only of the East Bank, and that the US was prepared to support a return of the West Bank to Jordan with minor boundary rectifications. The US would use its influence to obtain compensation to Jordan for any territory it would be required to give up. Finally, although as a matter of policy the US did not agree with Jordan's position on Jerusalem, nor with the Israeli position on Jerusalem, the US was prepared to use its influence to obtain for Jordan a role in Jerusalem. Secretary Rusk advised President Johnson that he confirmed Goldberg's pledge regarding territorial integrity to King Hussein.

During a subsequent meeting between President Johnson, King Hussein, and Secretary of State Rusk, Hussein said the phrasing of the resolution calling for withdrawal from occupied territories could be interpreted to mean that the Egyptians should withdraw from Gaza and the Jordanians should withdraw from the West Bank. He said this possibility was evident from a speech given by Prime Minister Eshkol in which it had been claimed that both Gaza and the West Bank had been "occupied territory". The President agreed, and promised he would talk to Ambassador Goldberg about inserting Israel in that clause. Ambassador Goldberg told King Hussein that after taking into account legitimate Arab concerns and suggestions, the US would be willing to add the word "Israeli" before "Armed Forces" in the first operative paragraph.

A State Department study noted that when King Hussein met on 8 November with President Johnson, who had been briefed by Secretary Rusk on the US interpretation, the Jordanian monarch asked how soon the Israeli troops would withdraw from most of the occupied lands. The President replied "In six months."

American political scientist William B. Quandt wrote about Johnson's meeting with Eban on 24 October 1967, and noted that Israel had annexed East Jerusalem. He said Johnson forcefully told Eban he thought Israel had been unwise when it went to war and that he still thought they were unwise. The President stressed the need to respect the territorial integrity of the Arab states. Quandt said "'The President wished to caution the Israelis that the further they get from June 5 the further they get from peace.' Meaning the more territory they insisted on holding beyond the 1967 lines, the worse would be the odds of getting a peace agreement with the Arabs."

== Interpretations ==
Israel interprets Resolution 242 as calling for withdrawal from territories as part of a negotiated peace and full diplomatic recognition. The extent of withdrawal would come as a result of comprehensive negotiations that led to durable peace not before Arabs start to meet their own obligations under Resolution 242.

Initially, the resolution was accepted by Egypt, Jordan and Israel but not by the Palestine Liberation Organization. The Arab position was initially that the resolution called for Israel to withdraw from all the territory it occupied during the Six-Day War prior to peace agreements.

Israel and the Arab states have negotiated before the Israeli withdrawal. Israel and Jordan made peace without Israel withdrawing from the West Bank, since Jordan had already renounced its claims and recognized the PLO as the sole representative of the Palestinians. Egypt began negotiations before Israel withdrew from the Sinai. Negotiations ended without Egypt ever resuming control of the Gaza Strip, which Egypt held until 1967.

Supporters of the "Palestinian viewpoint" focus on the phrase in the resolution's preamble emphasizing the "inadmissibility of the acquisition of territory by war", and note that the French version called for withdrawal from "des territoires occupés" – "the territories occupied". The French UN delegation insisted on this interpretation at the time, but both English and French are the Secretariat's working languages.

Supporters of the "Israeli viewpoint" note that the second part of that same sentence in the preamble explicitly recognizes the need of existing states to live in security. They focus on the operative phrase calling for "secure and recognized boundaries" and note that the resolution calls for a withdrawal "from territories" rather than "from the territories" or "from all territories," as the Arabs and others proposed; the latter two terms were rejected from the final draft of Resolution 242.

Alexander Orakhelashvili cites a number of cases in which international tribunals have ruled that international organizations, including the Security Council, are bound by general international law. He says that inclusion of explicit clauses about the inadmissibility of acquisition of territory by war and requiring respect of territorial integrity and sovereignty of a state demonstrates that the Council does not intend to offend peremptory norms in these specific ways. The resolution also acknowledges that these principles must be part of an accepted settlement. That is confirmed by the Vienna Convention on the Law of Treaties which reiterates the prohibition on the use of force and provides that any settlement obtained by the threat or use of force in violation of the principles of international law embodied in the Charter of the United Nations or conflicting with a peremptory norm of general international law is invalid. According to Hans-Paul Gasser, ‘doubtful’ wording of the Council's resolutions must always be construed in such a way as to avoid conflict with fundamental international obligations.

The USSR, India, Mali, Nigeria and Arab States all proposed that the resolution be changed to read "all territories" instead of "territories." Their request was discussed by the UN Security Council and "territories" was adopted instead of "all territories", after President Johnson told Premier Alexei Kosygin that the delegates should not try to negotiate the details of a Middle East settlement in the corridors and meeting halls of the United Nations, and Ambassador Goldberg stipulated that the exact wording of the resolution would not affect the position of any of the parties. Per Lord Caradon, the chief author of the resolution:

It was from occupied territories that the Resolution called for withdrawal. The test was which territories were occupied. That was a test not possibly subject to any doubt. As a matter of plain fact East Jerusalem, the West Bank, Gaza, the Golan and Sinai were occupied in the 1967 conflict. It was on withdrawal from occupied territories that the Resolution insisted.

Lord Caradon also maintained,

They're bad boundaries; they're just where the troops happened to be at a cease-fire line twenty years before, just where they happened to be sitting. The Arab legion was sitting across the road from Tel Aviv to Jerusalem and therefore there had to be a detour right up to 1967. So we knew—we all knew—that the boundaries of '67 were not drawn as permanent frontiers, they were a cease-fire line of a couple of decades earlier. So we deliberately did not say—I'm glad to be able to say that—we did not say that the '67 boundaries must be forever. We thought there should be a boundary commission to hear both sides and to deal with the thing in a sensible manner.

During a symposium on the subject Lord Caradon said that Israel was in clear defiance of resolution 242. He specifically cited the "annexation of East Jerusalem" and "the creeping colonialism on the West Bank and in Gaza and in the Golan."

However, British Foreign Secretary George Brown said:

I have been asked over and over again to clarify, modify or improve the wording, but I do not intend to do that. The phrasing of the Resolution was very carefully worked out, and it was a difficult and complicated exercise to get it accepted by the UN Security Council. I formulated the Security Council Resolution. Before we submitted it to the Council, we showed it to Arab leaders. The proposal said 'Israel will withdraw from territories that were occupied', and not from 'the' territories, which means that Israel will not withdraw from all the territories.

=== The PLO ===
The day after Resolution 242 was adopted, the Palestine Liberation Organization (PLO) rejected it as "fundamentally and gravely inconsistent with the Arab character of Palestine, the essence of the Palestine cause and the right of the Palestinian people to their homeland." and "disappoints the hopes of the Arab nation and ignores its national aspirations [... and] ignores the existence of the Palestinian people and their right of self-determination."

Replacing the National Charter of 1964 formulated by the first Palestine National Council (PNC), a revised National Charter was drawn up by the fourth PNC at Cairo in July 1968.

At the 12th PNC in Cairo on 8 June 1974, the PLO adopted the Ten-Point Program. Some hardline factions split away to form the Rejectionist Front. On the same day the PNC recommended to the PLO executive committee participation in the Geneva process. While reiterating its rejection of UN 242 the PLO should engage in a "framework other than that of resolution 242." The Program, a compromise with rejectionists, marked the first official PLO document that suggested the feasibility of a two-state solution. While Israel was not likely to accept such conditions, the document suggested compromise. According to scholar Shaul Mishal, "a real shift in the PLO position towards the occupied territories;unequivocal support for military struggle has ever since been supplemented by a willingness to consider political means as well." Although a minority, the creation of the Rejectionist Front enabled an argument that the PLO did not speak for all Palestinians and so should not participate at Geneva.

On 22 November 1974, United Nations General Assembly Resolution 3236 recognized the right of the Palestinian people to self-determination, national independence and sovereignty in Palestine. It also recognized the PLO as the sole legitimate representative of the Palestinian people, and accorded it observer status in the United Nations. In 1975, as part of the Sinai II agreement, Kissinger had promised Israel that the United States would not deal with the PLO until it recognized Israel's right to exist and accepted United Nations Security Council Resolutions 242 and 338. The 1978 Camp David Accords attempted to address the Palestinian problem but there continued to be no direct Palestinian representation.

The 1988 Palestinian Declaration of Independence included a PNC call for multilateral negotiations on the basis of UN Security Council Resolution 242 later known as "the Historic Compromise", implying acceptance of a two-state solution and no longer questioning the legitimacy of the State of Israel. The PNC called only for withdrawal from Arab Jerusalem and "Arab territories occupied." Together with Yasser Arafat's later statements in Geneva this was accepted by the United States as a basis for dialogue. For the Madrid Conference of 1991 Israel still refused to deal directly with the PLO and the Palestinians formed part of a joint delegation with Jordan. Finally, in the 1993 Declaration of Principles and the subsequent Israeli-Palestinian agreements, Israel and the PLO each recognized the other and agreed terms of reference as Resolutions 242 and 338.

=== Statements by Security Council representatives ===
The representative for India stated to the Security Council:

It is our understanding that the draft resolution, if approved by the Council, will commit it to the application of the principle of total withdrawal of Israel forces from all the territories – I repeat, all the territories – occupied by Israel as a result of the conflict which began on 5 June 1967.

The representatives from Nigeria, France, Soviet Union, Bulgaria, United Arab Republic (Egypt), Ethiopia, Jordan, Argentina and Mali supported this view, as worded by the representative from Mali: "[Mali] wishes its vote today to be interpreted in the light of the clear and unequivocal interpretation which the representative of India gave of the provisions of the United Kingdom text." The Russian representative Vasili Kuznetsov stated:

We understand the decision taken to mean the withdrawal of Israel forces from all, and we repeat, all territories belonging to Arab States and seized by Israel following its attack on those States on 5 June 1967. This is borne out by the preamble to the United Kingdom draft resolution [S/8247] which stresses the "inadmissibility of the acquisition of territory by war". It follows that the provision contained in that draft relating to the right of all States in the Near East "to live in peace within secure and recognized boundaries" cannot serve as a pretext for the maintenance of Israel forces on any part of the Arab territories seized by them as a result of war.

Israel was the only country represented at the Security Council to express a contrary view. The United States, United Kingdom, Canada, Denmark, China and Japan were silent on the matter, but the US and UK did point out that other countries' comments on the meaning of 242 were simply their own views. The Syrian representative was strongly critical of the text's "vague call on Israel to withdraw".

The statement by the Brazilian representative perhaps gives a flavour of the complexities at the heart of the discussions:

I should like to restate...the general principle that no stable international order can be based on the threat or use of force, and that the occupation or acquisition of territories brought about by such means should not be recognized...Its acceptance does not imply that borderlines cannot be rectified as a result of an agreement freely concluded among the interested States. We keep constantly in mind that a just and lasting peace in the Middle East has necessarily to be based on secure permanent boundaries freely agreed upon and negotiated by the neighboring States.

However, the Soviet delegate Vasily Kuznetsov argued: " ... phrases such as 'secure and recognized boundaries'. ... make it possible for Israel itself arbitrarily to establish new boundaries and to withdraw its forces only to those lines it considers appropriate." [1373rd meeting, para. 152.]

U.S. Supreme Court Justice Arthur Goldberg, who represented the US in discussions, later stated: "The notable omissions in regard to withdrawal are the word 'the' or 'all' and 'the June 5, 1967, lines' the resolution speaks of withdrawal from occupied territories, without defining the extent of withdrawal".

== Implementation ==
On 23 November 1967, the Secretary General appointed Gunnar Jarring as Special Envoy to negotiate the implementation of the resolution with the parties, the so-called Jarring Mission. The governments of Israel, Egypt, Jordan and Lebanon recognized Jarring's appointment and agreed to participate in his shuttle diplomacy, although they differed on key points of interpretation of the resolution. The government of Syria rejected Jarring's mission on grounds that total Israeli withdrawal was a prerequisite for further negotiations. The talks under Jarring's auspices lasted until 1973, but bore no results. After 1973, the Jarring mission was replaced by bilateral and multilateral peace conferences.

== See also ==
- Khartoum Resolution
- List of the UN resolutions concerning Israel
- List of the UN resolutions concerning Palestine
- United Nations

=== Arab–Israeli peace diplomacy and treaties ===
- Paris Peace Conference, 1919
- Faisal–Weizmann Agreement (1919)
- 1949 Armistice Agreements
- Camp David Accords (1978)
- Egypt–Israel peace treaty (1979)
- Madrid Conference of 1991
- Oslo Accords (1993)
- Israel–Jordan peace treaty (1994)
- Camp David 2000 Summit
- Israeli–Palestinian peace process
- Projects working for peace among Israelis and Arabs
- List of Middle East peace proposals
- International law and the Arab–Israeli conflict
