= Melek Tourhan =

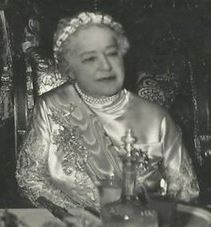
- Sultana Melek in 1938

Sultana of Egypt
- Tenure: 19 December 1914 – 9 October 1917
- Born: 27 October 1869; Istanbul, Ottoman Empire
- Died: 4 February 1956 (aged 86); Heliopolis, Cairo, Egypt
- Burial: Al-Rifa'i Mosque The Khedival Mausoleum, Cairo, Egypt
- Spouse: Hussein Kamel of Egypt (m. 1887; d. 1917)
- Issue: Princess Kadria; Princess Samiha; Princess Badiha
- House: Alawiyya (by marriage)
- Father: Hasan Tourhan Pasha
- Mother: Jeshm Afet Hanim (adoptive)
- Religion: Sunni Islam

Melek Hassan Tourhan (Arabic: ملك حسن طوران) (27 October 1869 – 4 February 1956) was the second wife of Sultan Hussein Kamel of Egypt. After her husband ascended the throne in 1914, she became known as Sultana Melek (Arabic: السلطانة ملك).

== Early life ==
Monarchical styles of Sultana Melek
- Reference style: Her Highness
- Spoken style: Your Highness
- Alternative style: Khanum

Born in Istanbul on 27 October 1869, Melek was a Circassian. However, unlike many Circassians in the Ottoman era, she was not a slave. Emine Foat Tugay, whose mother Princess Nimet Mouhtar was a friend of Melek, described her as "a pocket Venus, tiny but perfectly proportioned, a pretty, lively brunette, with great charm." Tugay states in her family memoirs that "as a child [Melek] was delicate and was often sent to spend a fortnight with Neshedil Qadin [wife of Khedive Isma'il and mother of Princess Nimet] in the salubrious air of Zaaferan."

Melek's father Hasan Tourhan Pasha was a captain in the Ottoman Navy. When Melek was still an infant, he offered her for adoption in order to improve her lot in life. Melek was adopted by Jeshm Afet Hanim, the third wife of Khedive Isma'il Pasha of Egypt.

== Marriage ==
On 26 December 1886, she married Hussein Kamel, the khedive's favorite son. They had three daughters: Kadria, Samiha and Badiha. Hussein Kamel was not expected to ascend the throne when Melek married him. When his eldest brother Khedive Tewfik died in 1892, he was succeeded by his son Abbas Hilmi II, who fathered two sons of his own during his reign. However, events took an unexpected turn with the outbreak of World War I. The United Kingdom, which was occupying Egypt at the time, deposed Abbas and installed his uncle Hussein Kamel as Egypt's new ruler. Hussein Kamel was given the title of Sultan of Egypt by the British in order to emphasize the end of Egypt's status as a vassal of the Ottoman Sultan. As a result, Melek received the title of Sultana. Hussein Kamel invented for himself and his wife the style of Hautesse (Arabic: عظمة, romanized: Azama), which can be translated into English as Gloriness.

Hussein Kamel was a family man who treated Melek with respect and devotion. During his reign, Melek kept a low profile. In keeping with the other royal consorts who preceded her, she attended performances at the Khedivial Opera House, although she was seated in a box separated from the rest of the audience by a Mashrabiya.

== Widowhood ==
When Hussein Kamel died in 1917, his only surviving son Prince Kamal el Dine Hussein (born of a previous marriage) renounced his succession rights, and so the throne went to Hussein Kamel's brother Fuad. On 11 October 1917, only two days after his ascension to the throne, Fuad issued a rescript allowing Melek to keep her sultanic title. When a formal order of precedence was established for the Kingdom of Egypt in 1932, he issued another rescript whereby Melek was placed second only to Queen Nazli in the order of precedence, and before all the other princesses of the Royal Family. By then, Melek was considered the Sultana, while Nazli was considered the Queen. As a widow, Melek was no longer secluded but was visible at official occasions and photographs, such at the wedding between King Farouk in 1938. In 1923, along with Crown Prince Leopold and Queen Elisabeth of Belgium, Melek visited the newly discovered tomb of Tutankhamun in Luxor. The Western press of the time often referred to her as the Dowager Sultana, a title that carried no legal standing in Egypt.

Melek never remarried and spent her four decades of widowhood travelling with her slaves to Europe, Lebanon and Luxor. Her title stayed as Sultana even after the coronation of King Farouk I. Her principal residence was her palace in the Cairo suburb of Heliopolis, opposite the famous Villa Baron Empain. Historian Samir Raafat describes the widowed Melek as an "aging Sultana [who] held an outdated a-la-Turca court in her zany Heliopolis palace."

== Death ==
Melek died in Cairo on 4 February 1956, having witnessed the 1952 Revolution and the ensuing abolition of the monarchy.

== Honours ==
- Decoration of Al Kemal in brilliants (Egypt, 1915).

== See also ==
- List of consorts of the Muhammad Ali Dynasty

== Bibliography ==
- Hamamsy, Chafika Soliman (2005). Zamalek: The Changing Life of a Cairo Elite, 1850–1945. American University in Cairo Press. ISBN 978-977-424-893-1. OCLC 60649965.
- Hassan, Hassan (2000). In the House of Muhammad Ali: A Family Album, 1805–1952. American University in Cairo Press. ISBN 978-977-424-554-1. OCLC 45016821.
- Montgomery-Massingberd, Hugh, ed. (1980). "The Royal House of Egypt". Burke's Royal Families of the World. Vol. II: Africa & the Middle East. London: Burke's Peerage. pp. 20–37. ISBN 978-0-85011-029-6. OCLC 18496936.
- Mostyn, Trevor (2006). Egypt's Belle Epoque: Cairo and the Age of the Hedonists. New York: Tauris Parke Paperbacks. ISBN 978-1-84511-240-0. OCLC 73175079.
- Tugay, Emine Foat (1974). Three Centuries: Family Chronicles of Turkey and Egypt. Westport, CT: Greenwood Press. ISBN 978-0-8371-7117-3. OCLC 799594.

Egyptian royalty
New title Sultanate of Egypt established	Sultana of Egypt; 1914–1917	Vacant Title next held by Nazli Sabri
