= Inji Hanim =

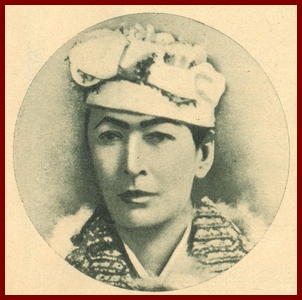
- Died: 5 September 1890; Alexandria, Egypt
- Burial: Al-Rifa'i Mosque, Cairo, Egypt
- Spouse: Sa'id Pasha (died 1863)
Names
- Arabic: انجه هانم; Turkish: İnci Hanım
- House: Muhammad Ali (by marriage)
- Religion: Sunni Islam

Inji Hanim (Arabic: انجه هانم; Turkish: İnci Hanım; died 5 September 1890) was the first wife of Sa'id Pasha, Wāli of Egypt and Sudan from 1854 until 1863. She was known among the Europeans as Princess Sa'id.

== Marriage ==
She was captured as a slave at the age of 6. Inji was brought to the Harem of the Muhammad Ali dynasty and married viceroy Sa'id Pasha, before his accession to the throne. Some otherwise perceptive foreign residents were convinced that she was his sole consort, a measure of the obscurity Melekber Hanim. Sa'id always remained loyal to her. She was red haired, charming and accomplished.

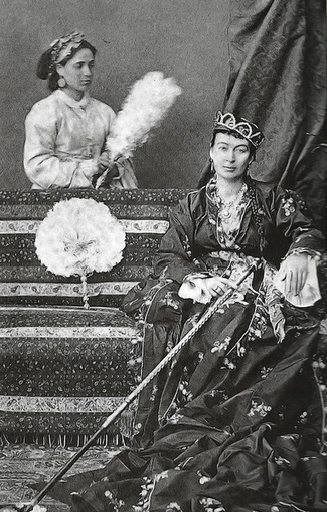
A 19th century photograph of Inji Hanim

Like Muhammad Ali and his grandson Isma'il Pasha, Sa'id was attuned to international opinion and "courted publicity." Inji may be an early example of the "diplomatic wife", the wife that Ottoman statesman in the later nineteenth century designated as the one to receive the wives of foreign diplomats and other lady visitors. Indeed, she acquired her fame among Europeans mainly due to her willingness to receive visits by foreign women, who admired her beauty and intelligence.

She was known for her kind and courteous manners towards Europeans. She had always been particularly accessible to strangers, was an admirably mistress in her own house, and was universally popular among all classes. She has been mentioned in the books of several European travelers who have had the privilege of visiting her.

Miss Matinaeu speaks of her in 1845 as "the lovely wife of Sa'id Pasha", who saw her first in 1872. Inji Hanim was a beauty on the wane. She had a considerable attraction, a commanding height and dignified deportment made her conspicuous in any assembly. She had adopted in her palace many European improvements which conduced to sanitary reform, and her table was served à la franque; but she, in her own person, kept to the native fashion of dressing.

== Widowhood and death ==
After Sa'id's death in 1863, Inji never remarried, and took center stage at the parties and receptions to which the khedive invited European society.

She died at Alexandria on 5 September 1890. She was buried in the Nabi Daniel Mosque, Alexandria, and was later reburied in the Al-Rifa'i Mosque, Cairo, Egypt.

== See also ==
- List of consorts of the Muhammad Ali Dynasty

== Sources ==
- Chennells, Ellen (1893). Recollections of an Egyptian Princess, Volume 1. William Blackwood.
- Doumani, B. (February 1, 2012). Family History in the Middle East: Household, Property, and Gender. SUNY Press. ISBN 978-0-7914-8707-5.
- Mostyn, Trevor (September 5, 2006). Egypt's Belle Epoque: Cairo and the Age of the Hedonists. Tauris Parke Paperbacks. ISBN 978-1-84511-240-0.
- Cuno, Kenneth M. (April 1, 2015). Modernizing Marriage: Family, Ideology, and Law in Nineteenth- and Early Twentieth-Century Egypt. Syracuse University Press. ISBN 978-0-815-65316-5.
