= Prince Omar Toussoun =

Egyptian prince

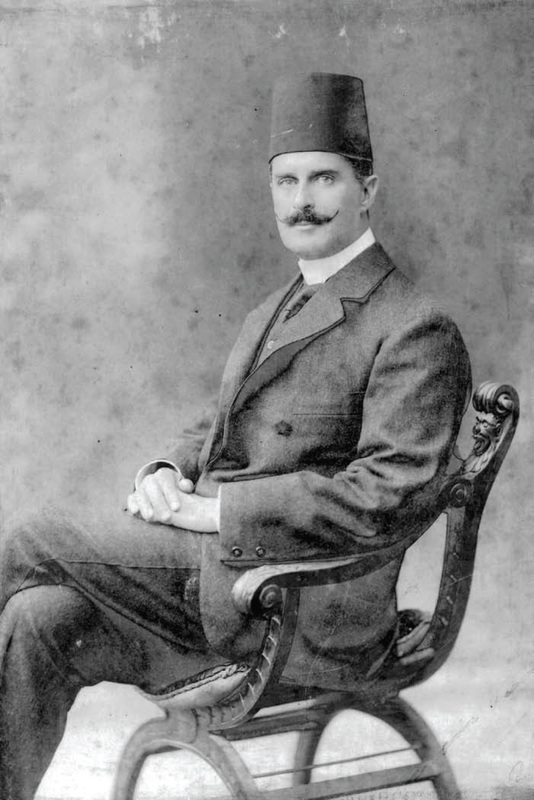
- Born: 8 September 1872; Alexandria, Sultanate of Egypt
- Died: 26 January 1944 (aged 71); Alexandria, Kingdom of Egypt
- Burial: Egyptian Royal Family’s mausoleum on Nebi Daniel Street
- Spouse: Princess Bahiga Hassan (1877–1947)
- Issue: Prince Said Omar Toussoun (1901–1980); Prince Hassan Omar Toussoun (1901–1946); Princess Amina Omar Toussoun (1903–1982); Prince Esmat Omar Toussoun (1904–1918).
Names
- Prince Mohamed Omar Toussoun
- House: House of Muhammad Ali
- Father: Prince Mohamed Toussoun Pasha
- Mother: Princess Bahshat Hour
- Religion: Islam
- Occupation: Historian, archaeologist, explorer

Prince Mohamed Omar Toussoun (1872–1944) was an Egyptian prince of the Muhammad Ali dynasty. He is one of the most admired princes of the Muhammad Ali family. He was famous for his excellence in many fields, his charitable works, his discoveries and his writings in geography, history and archaeology. He published many books and maps in Arabic and French, and he was the first to suggest sending a delegation from Egypt to the Versailles conference to demand its independence, a task later accomplished by Saad Zaghloul.

== Biography ==
Prince Omar Toussoun was born in Alexandria on 8 September 1872 to Princess Bahshat Hour and Prince Mohamed Toussoun Pasha, son of the Wāli of Egypt, Muhammad Sa'id Pasha. He lost his father when he was four years old, and his paternal grandmother, Princess Melek Per, took care of his upbringing. In his youth he travelled extensively in Europe. Toussoun studied business and languages in Switzerland, becoming fluent in French and English, besides Turkish and Arabic.

On 14 August 1898 Toussoun married Princess Bahiga Hassan (1877–1947), one of the daughters of Prince Hassan Pasha, son of Khedive Ismail. They had four children: Said (1901–1980), Hassan (1901–1948), and daughters Amina (1903–1982) and Esmat (1904–1918).

During a visit to England, he got acquainted with the Scout Movement, and made plans to introduce it to Egypt, which he did in 1914.

Prince Omar Toussoun died on 26 January 1944. He had requested a simple funeral, which was granted by King Farouk.

== Activities ==
=== Memberships ===
Prince Omar Toussoun was involved in many scientific bodies, and he had a high position among literary societies involved with the spread of culture and science. Among the scientific bodies in which he was involved are the following:

- First president (1910–1934) of the Egyptian Olympic Committee
- The Egyptian Scientific Institute
- Member of the Royal Geographical Society
- Member of the Arab Scientific Academy of Damascus
- Arab Antiquities Association
- President of the Coptic Archaeological Society

=== Royal Agricultural Society ===
In 1932 Prince Omar Toussoun was appointed head of the Royal Agricultural Society, which specialized in agricultural affairs in Egypt and worked on developing agricultural and livestock production.

=== Archaeological discoveries ===
In 1910, Gaston Jondet, chief engineer of the Ports and Lighthouses Authority, discovered the ancient port of Pharos and described breakwaters and giant structures submerged 8 meters below the surface. This discovery was a great surprise for the lack of strong historical evidence for the existence of such structures. Omar Toussoun and Gaston Jondet proposed and published theories and explanations of their discoveries at the Archaeological Society in Alexandria.

In the early 1930s, Omar Toussoun found important archaeological remains of several Coptic monasteries located on the line of the Holy Family's journey. In 1933, an RAF pilot named John T Cull sighted archaeological remains covering a large area underwater at the mouth of the Nile river. On his return, he contacted Prince Omar Toussoun who, with the guidance of local fishermen and the aid of divers, was able to locate several huge structures and recover a statue of Alexander the Great, now on display in the Graeco-Roman Museum. Only decades later those remains were identified as being the ancient city of Canopus.

== Publications ==
From around 1922 until his death, Tousson published more than 45 books and articles, as well as tens of lectures and key-note speeches, in French and Arabic. Following is a list of selected works:

- Four letters printed in about the year 1925 AD and reprinted repeatedly (the crafts, military schools, scientific missions, and the Egyptian land and sea army)
- Egypt and Sudan (1927)
- Words for the sake of Egypt (1928)
- Memorandum on the issue of Sudan between Egypt and England (1929)
- Egypt's Victims in Sudan and the Mysteries of the English Politics (for al-Mutla'a Muzun), printed at the expense of the Emir (1935)
- Egypt's finance from the era of the Pharaohs to now (1931)
- The Egyptian land and sea army during the reign of Muhammad Ali Pasha (1931)
- Industries and military schools during the reign of Muhammad Ali Pasha (1932)
- The Sudanese Egyptian Argas Championship in the Mexico War (1933)
- Scientific missions during the reign of Muhammad Ali Pasha and then in the reigns of Abbas I and Said (1934)
- Geographical historical atlas of Lower Egypt, from the Islamic conquest to now (1934)
- The Egyptian Army in the Russian War known as the Crimean War 1853–1855, printed in (1936)

== Bibliography ==
- Fahmy, Qalini (1944). Duty to Fulfillment: Prince Omar Toson: His Life, Effects, and Works (in Arabic). Cairo: Costa Thomas and Co. Press.
- Royal Agricultural Society of Egypt (1946). The Memory of Prince Omar Toussoun: The life history of the deceased and the legacies of bodies and individuals (in Arabic). Cairo: Mustafa Al-Babi Al-Halabi Press.
