= Jananiyar Hanim =

- Second Princess
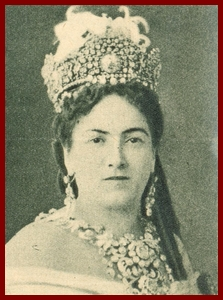

Princess consort of Egypt
- Tenure: 19 January 1863 – 26 June 1879
- Born: c. 1835
- Died: 12 December 1912 (aged 76–77); Saffron Palace, Cairo, Egypt
- Burial: Al-Rifa'i Mosque
- Consort: Isma'il Pasha of Egypt (died 1895)
- Issue: Princess Zainab Hanim; Prince Ibrahim Hilmi Pasha
Names
- Arabic: جانانيار هانم; Turkish: Cenaniyar Hanım; Ottoman Turkish: جنان یار خانم
- House: Alawiyya (by marriage)
- Religion: Sunni Islam

Jananiyar Hanim (Arabic: جانانيار هانم; Turkish: Cenaniyar Hanım; died 12 December 1912) was the second wife of Khedive Isma'il Pasha of Egypt.

== Life ==
She was a of Circassian of origin, having come to the harem of the Muhammad Ali dynasty in Egypt via the Circassian slave trade. Described as a 'wee dwarf of a handsome blonde', Jananiyar married Isma'il Pasha as his second wife before his accession to the throne.

She gave birth to six children, the eldest of whom was Isma'il's first born son, and heir. However, four of them, including the first born, died in childhood. Of the surviving, a daughter, Princess Zainab Hanim (died 1875) was born in 1859, followed by a son, Ibrahim Hilmi Pasha (died 1927), born in 1860. She had also adopted a Circassian girl named Fatma Kopses Hanim (1859 – 1888). After Isma'il's accession to the throne in 1863, she was given the title of "Second Princess", a position at which she remained throughout his entire reign, until his deposition in 1879. In Egypt she was known as Ortangi Hanim or Middle Lady. She was Isma'il's favourite wife.

Isma'il and her mother-in-law Hoshiyar Qadin launched a propaganda campaign in Istanbul. In February 1863, Pertevniyal Sultan arranged for Isma'il to meet her son Sultan Abdulaziz in private in her palace. In summer of 1864, Hoshiyar traveled to Istanbul, to help her son. She arrived with proposed new heir in question, her grandson Tewfik Pasha, lots of money, and diplomacy. In spring of 1866, they launched the greatest attack, in which the good offices of Pertevniyal may have been involved. In fact it was Jananiyar who conducted delicate negotiations with consummate ability at Istanbul, and who in gaining her husband's cause, thus ensured the throne to Tewfik.

In 1869, she met with the Princess of Wales Alexandra of Denmark, when the latter visited Istanbul with her husband Prince of Wales Edward (future Edward VII). In 1874, her daughter Zainab married Ibrahim Fahmi Pasha, son of Ahmad Rifaat Pasha. The princess, however, died before the marriage was consummated. After which, Ibrahim Fahmi married Princess Nimatullah Hanim, Isma'il's youngest daughter by the concubine Neshedil Qadin in 1890. She was widowed at Isma'il's death in 1895. In 1897, she took an active part in the Greco-Turkish War by contributing to the donation collection efforts in Egypt.

== Death ==
Jananiyar Hanim died on 12 December 1912 in the Saffron Palace, Cairo, and was buried in the Khedival Mausoleum, Al-Rifa'i Mosque. She was the last surviving wife of Isma'il.

== Gallery ==
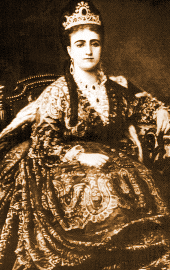
A photo of Jananiyar in formal dress.

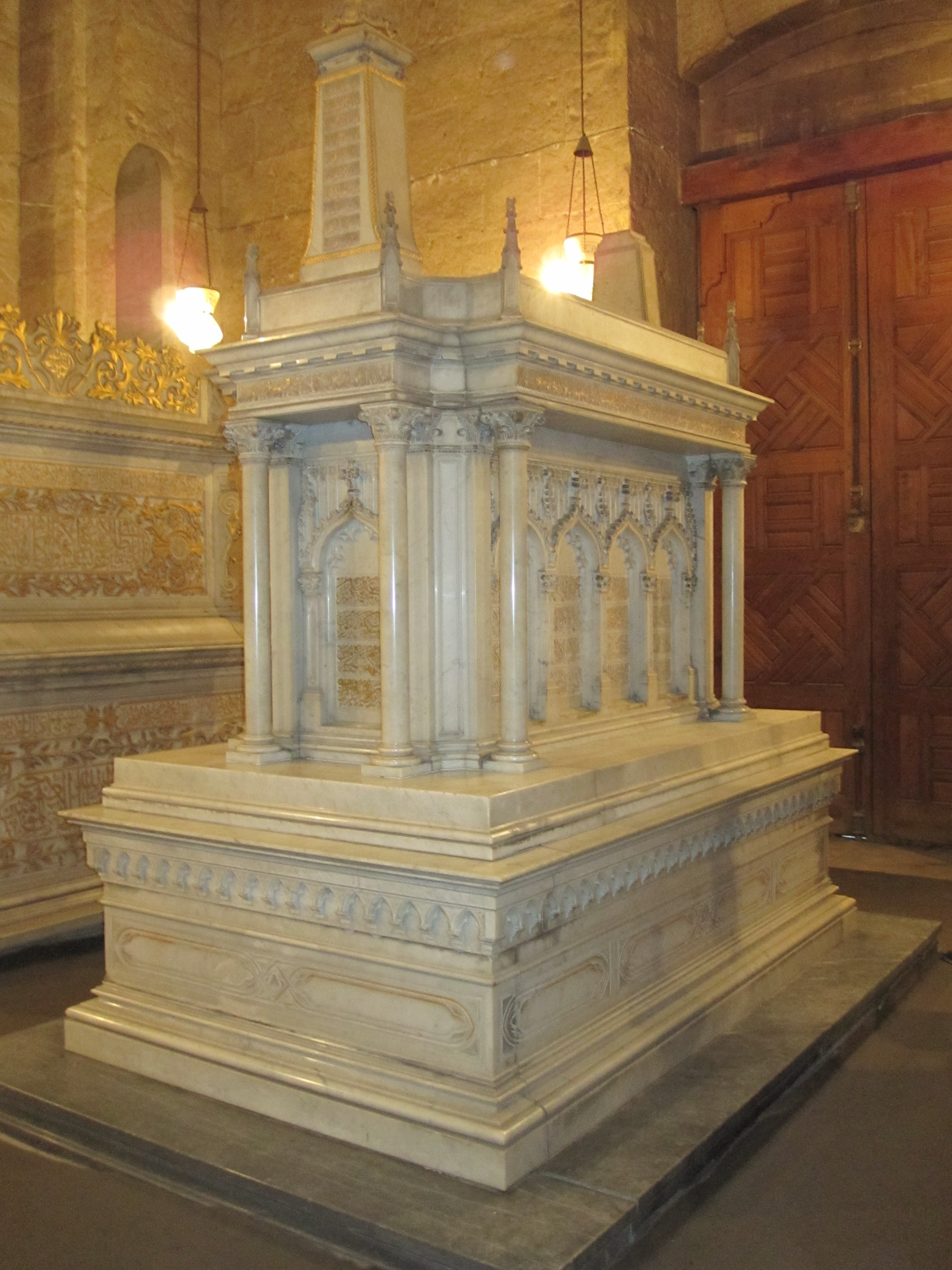
Tomb of Jananiyar Hanim in Al-Rifa'i Mosque in Cairo.

== See also ==
- List of consorts of the Muhammad Ali Dynasty

== Sources ==
- Chennells, Ellen (1893). Recollections of an Egyptian princess. Edinburgh: W. Blackwood. (Chennells was the teacher/governess for the daughter Zainab)
- Doumani, Beshara (2003). Family History in the Middle East: Household, Property, and Gender. SUNY Press. ISBN 978-0-791-48707-5.
