= Melekber Hanim =

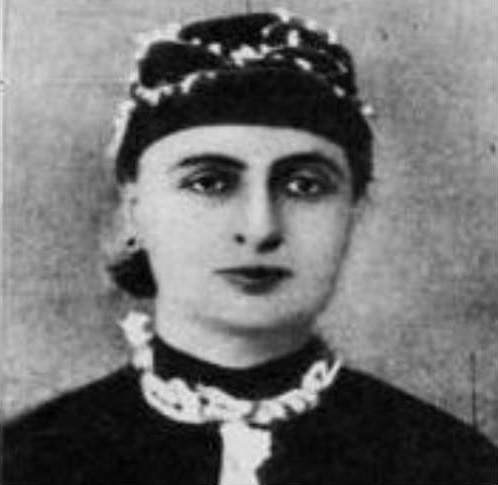
- Died: October 1890; Alexandria, Egypt
- Burial: Al-Rifa'i Mosque, Cairo, Egypt
- Spouse: Sa'id Pasha (died 1863)
- Issue: Mahmud Bey; Muhammad Tusun Pasha
Names
- Arabic: ملك بر هانم; Turkish: Melekper Hanım
- House: Muhammad Ali (by marriage)
- Religion: Sunni Islam

Melekber Hanim (Arabic: ملك بر هانم, Turkish: Melekper Hanım, died October 1890; meaning "Angel Wings") was the second wife of Sa'id Pasha, Wāli of Egypt and Sudan from 1854 until 1863.

== Life ==
Of Circassian origin, and victim to the Circassian slave trade, she was brought to the harem of the Muhammad Ali dynasty and married Sa'id, and gave birth to two sons, Prince Mahmud Bey, who died young at Alexandria in 1846, followed by Prince Muhammad Tusun Pasha, born on 30 April 1853. As Sa'id's marriage with his first wife Inji Hanim did not produce any children. So Melekber was selected as a wife for him. Some otherwise perceptive foreign residents were convinced that Inji Hanim was his sole consort, and a measure of the obscurity was Melekber, although, she had borne all of Sa'id's children.

After Sa'id's death in 1863 she never remarried. Their second son died in 1876 aged 23, and Melekber took upon herself the responsibility of raising his son, Prince Omar Toussoun, then only 3 years old. Melekber Hanim died at Alexandria in October 1890. She was buried in the Nabi Daniel Mosque, Alexandria, and was later reburied in the Al-Rifa'i Mosque, Cairo, Egypt.

== Issue ==
Together with Said, Melekber had two sons:

- Prince Mahmud Bey (died young, at Alexandria, 1846);
- Prince Muhammad Tusun Pasha (30 April 1853 - Alexandria, 10 July 1876);

== See also ==
- List of consorts of the Muhammad Ali Dynasty
