= Tawhida Hanim =

Egyptian princess (1850–1888)

- Born: 2 August 1850; Cairo, Egypt Eyalet, Ottoman Empire
- Died: 3 October 1888 (aged 38); Cairo, Khedivate of Egypt, Ottoman Empire
- Spouse: Mansur Yeghen Pasha (m. 1869)
- Issue: Qadri Bey; Saniya Hanim; Bahiya Hanim; Wahida Hanim
Names
- Arabic: توحيدة هانم; Turkish: Tevhide Hanım
- House: Muhammad Ali
- Father: Isma'il Pasha
- Mother: Shehret Feza Hanim
- Religion: Sunni Islam

Tawhida Hanim (Arabic: توحيدة هانم; Turkish: Tevhide Hanım; "the believe one"; 2 August 1850 – 3 October 1888) was an Egyptian princess and a member of the Muhammad Ali dynasty.

== Early life ==
Tawhida Hanim was born on 2 August 1850 in Cairo. She was the eldest daughter of Khedive Isma'il Pasha, and his first wife Shehret Feza Hanim. She had one sister, Fatima Hanim who was three years younger than her.

Her father and her grandmother Hoshiyar Qadin launched a propaganda campaign in Istanbul, with the proposed new heir in question, her half-brother Tewfik Pasha. In 1865 Isma'il sent her to spend the summer in Istanbul.

She had auburn hair and green eyes, was slim, of medium height, and was said to be intelligent. In 1866, as a guest in the imperial harem, Sultan Abdulaziz wanted to marry her. However, Grand Vizier Mehmed Fuad Pasha opposed the match because Isma'il then would have easier access to the sultan. Fuad's objection was written on piece of paper, and given to the head chamberlain, who instead of reading it to Abdulaziz, handed it to him. The sultan was insulted, Fuad was fired, and the marriage plans were cancelled.

== Marriage ==
As a young girl, she formed a friendship with a distant cousin, a lady of the Yeghen family, daughter of Ahmad Pasha, who were descendants of a sister of Muhammad Ali Pasha. Both girls enjoyed poetry and read classical Turkish compositions aloud to each other. They wrote verses in the styles of the great poets. These youthful efforts were submitted for criticism to a friend's elder brother, Mansur Yeghen Pasha, who returned them accompanied by notes written in perfect prose. The princess fell in love with the author of these missives, a man she had never seen. As he was still a bachelor, though nearing middle age, she decided to marry him. When the matter reached her father, he summoned her, and told her that both his family and his position were eminently suitable, apart from the great age difference. Tawhida persisted, and enlisted the help of her father's third wife, Jeshm Afet Hanim, with whom she was on more intimate terms than with her own mother.

In April 1869, Tawhida married Mansur Yeghen Pasha. The marriage took place with great splendour at Abdeen Palace. Among the wedding presents, the jewels alone filled three large trays. At the wedding, the music was continuous. A takht composed of Al-Laysi, Al-Hamuli and Al-Qaftanji, a group of musicians, performed in tandem with the female awalim, the muscling group of Almas and Sakina. There were also European entertainers. However, during the wedding, the greatest star was the Turkish Mehmed Şukri, a hawi (magician). Seraphin Manesse's French orchestra also performed. At this occasion the Egyptian nobles sat next to the ruler.

According to the old custom, Tawhida did not leave her home for seven days and on the eighth day she visited her parents. When she came to visit her parents at Abidin, she appeared happy to everyone. It was only in the apartments of Jeshm Afet that she wept bitterly, saying that her father had been right. She, however, never sought a divorce, and maintained an amiable and respectful attitude towards her husband. But with passing years she became capricious.

The two together had four children, one son, Qadri Bey who died young, and three daughters named Saniya Hanim, Bahiya Hanim, and Wahida Hanim. Saniya married Prince Davud Pasha, a grandson of Muhammad Ali Pasha the Young and had four sons. Bahiya married Aziz Izzet Pasha, who was Egyptian minister in London under King Fuad, and later one of the regents in King Farouk’s minority. They had three children, two sons and a daughter.

== Death ==
Tawhida died at the age of 38 at Cairo on 3 October 1888.

== Honour ==
Foreign honour

- Ottoman Empire: Decoration of the Order of Charity, 2nd class, 27 September 1878

== In popular culture ==
In the 2014 Egyptian historical drama series Saraya Abdeen, Tawhida is portrayed by Egyptian actress Nour Hani.

== Ancestry ==
Ancestors of Tawhida Hanim

16. Ibrahim Agha
8. Muhammad Ali Pasha
17. Zaibab Hanim
4. Ibrahim Pasha
18. Nusratli Ali Agha
9. Amina Hanim
2. Isma'il Pasha
5. Hoshiyar Qadin
1. Tawhida Hanim
3. Shehret Feza Hanim

== Sources ==
- Doumani, Beshara (2003). Family History in the Middle East: Household, Property, and Gender. SUNY Press. ISBN 978-0-791-48707-5.
- Mestyan, Adam (November 3, 2020). Arab Patriotism: The Ideology and Culture of Power in Late Ottoman Egypt. Princeton University Press. ISBN 978-0-691-20901-2.
- Tugay, Emine Foat (1974). Three Centuries: Family Chronicles of Turkey and Egypt. Westport, Connecticut: Greenwood Press. ISBN 978-0-8371-7117-3. OCLC 799594.
