= Jamal Nur Qadin =

- Born: 1850; Caucasus
- Died: 1876 (aged 25–26); Cairo, Egypt
- Burial: Khedival Mausoleum, Al-Rifa'i Mosque, Cairo, Egypt
- Spouse: Isma'il Pasha
- Issue: Prince Ali Jamal Pasha
Names
- Arabic: جمال نور قادین; Turkish: Cemalnur Kadın
- House: Muhammad Ali (by marriage)
- Religion: Sunni Islam

Jamal Nur Qadin (Arabic: جمال نور قادین; Turkish: Cemalnur Kadın; died c. 1876) was a consort to Khedive Isma'il Pasha of Egypt.

She is described as being pretty, but having short legs. She was frivolous, always laughing and joking, and when she walked in the garden with everyone, she could never resist in taking off her shoes and stockings to paddle in the basins of the fountains. She even lifted up her skirts so high that one could see the frills of her pantalettes. She was the one who gave a slightest twinge to Neshedil Qadin, another consort of Isma'il Pasha.

Jamal Nur died in childbirth at Cairo, in 1876, and was buried there at the Khedival Mausoleum, Al-Rifa'i Mosque.

Her son, Prince Ali Jamal Pasha was then bought up and cared for by Isma'il's first wife, Shehret Feza Hanim, for whom he never felt more than mildly affectionate gratitude. He, however, felt motherly love for Neshedil Qadin, who had lost her own son. He went to school at Theresianum, Vienna, where he died from diphtheria, at the age of seventeen.
