= Kadriye (given name) =

Kadriye is a Turkish given name. Notable people with the name include:

- Kadriye Aksoy (born 1999), Turkish freestyle sport wrestler
- Kadriye Gökçek, Turkish football referee
- Kadria Hussein (1888–1955), Egyptian royal and writer
- Kadriye Nurmambet (born 1933), Dobrujan-born Crimean Tatar traditional folk singer and folklorist
- Kadriye Selimoğlu (born 1978), Turkish taekwondo practitioner

== See also ==
- Kadriye, a township in Serik district of Antalya Province, Turkey
