= Ignaz Friedman =

Polish pianist and composer (1882–1948)

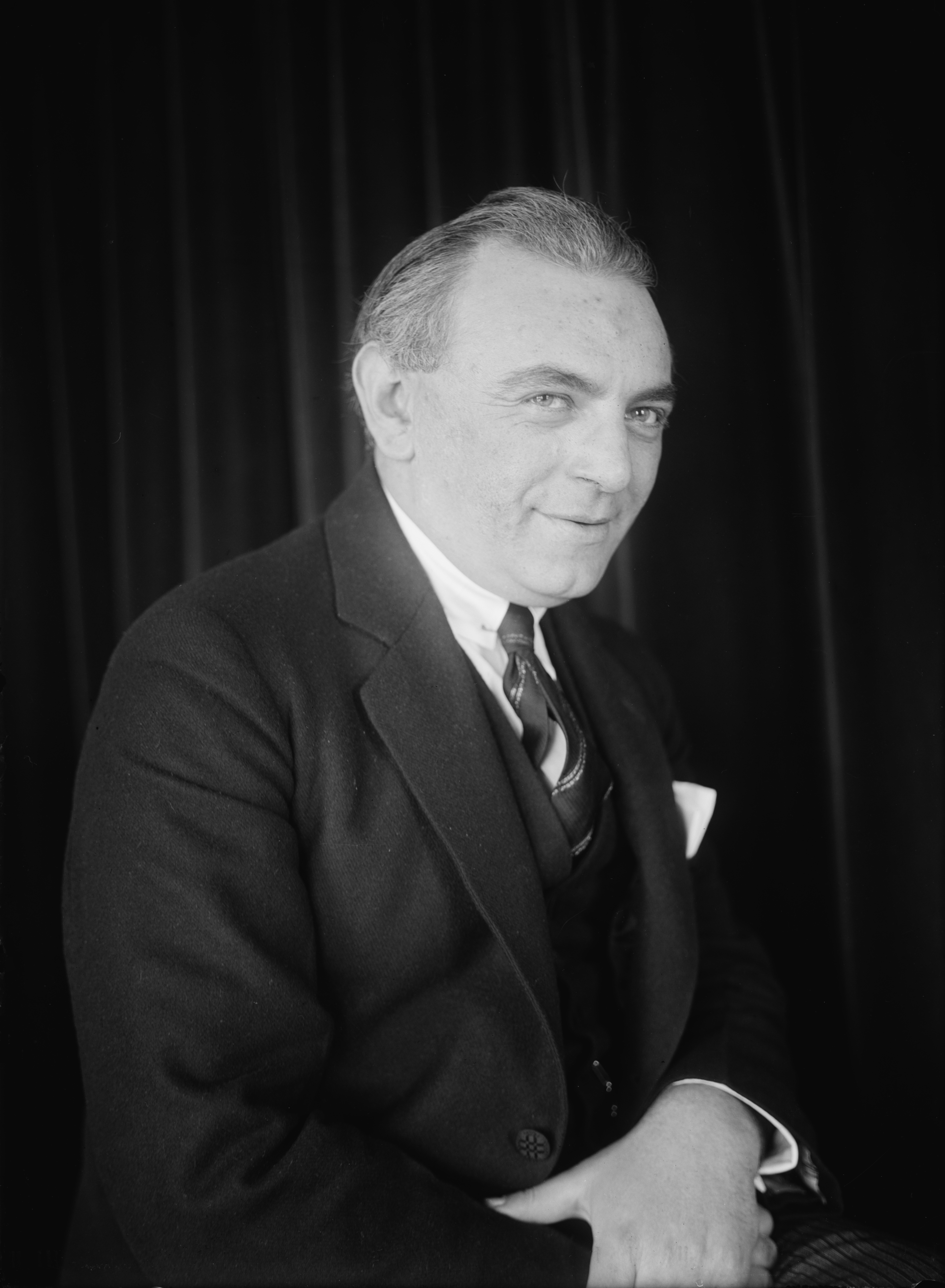
- Born: Salomon Izaak Freudmann; February 13, 1882; Podgórze, Galicia, Austria-Hungary
- Died: January 26, 1948 (age 65); Sydney, Australia
- Occupations: Pianist, composer

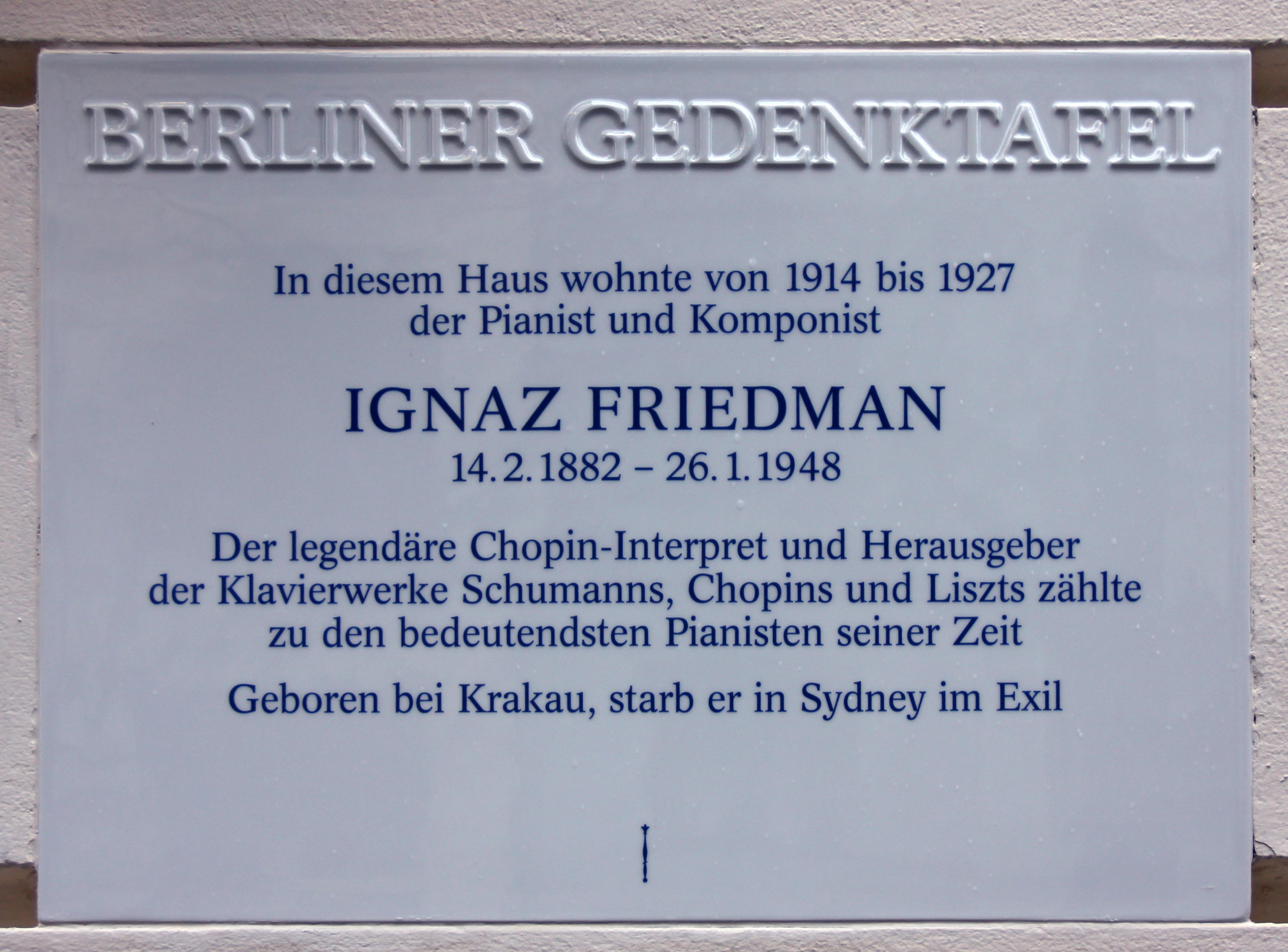
Berlin memorial plaque, Pariser Straße 21, in Berlin-Wilmersdorf, Germany

Ignaz Friedman (born Salomon Izaak Freudmann; Polish: Ignacy Friedman; Yiddish: שְׁלֹמֹה יִצְחָק פֿרײדמאַן; February 13, 1882 – January 26, 1948) was a Polish pianist and composer. Critics (e.g. Harold Schonberg) and colleagues (e.g. Sergei Rachmaninoff) alike placed him among the supreme piano virtuosi of his day, alongside Leopold Godowsky, Moriz Rosenthal, Ferruccio Busoni, Josef Hofmann and Josef Lhévinne.

== Early and later life ==
Born to an itinerant Jewish musician in Podgórze near Kraków (his birthplace exists at the Kalwaryjska str. 22) as a son of Nachman (sometimes Wolf or Wilhelm) Freudmann, sometimes Freudman (born in Monasterzyska, now Ukraine, July 10, 1857) and Salomea Eisenbach (born in Krakow March 26, 1854), Ignaz Friedman was a child prodigy. He studied with Hugo Riemann in Leipzig and Theodor Leschetizky in Vienna, and participated in Ferruccio Busoni's master classes.

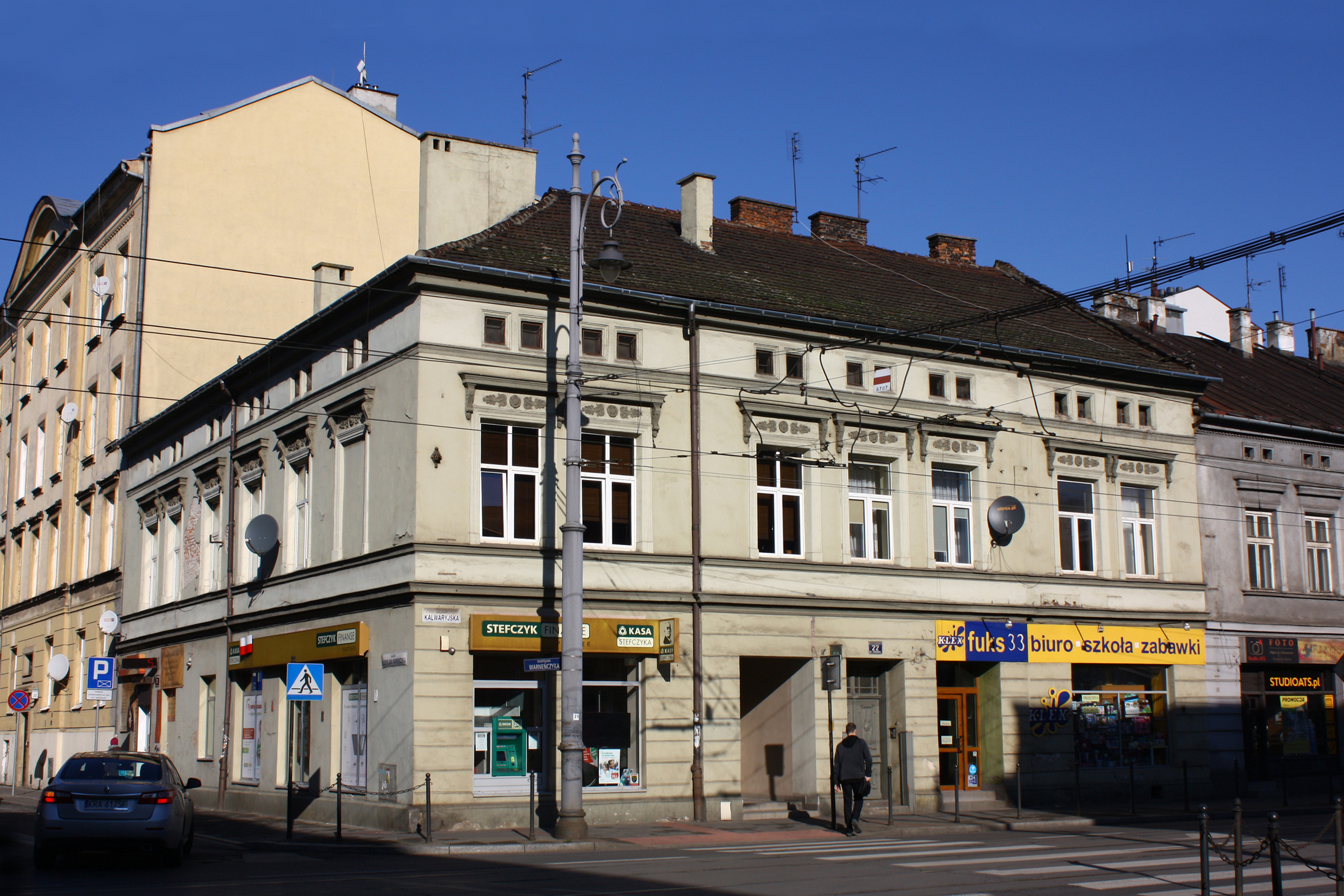
House at the 22, Kalwaryjska Str., Krakow, where Ignaz Friedman was born (50.043165, 19.945430)

Friedman lived in Berlin until 1914 and settled in Copenhagen in 1920.

== Career ==
His official début in Vienna in 1904 featured a program of three piano concertos, rivaling the similar programs of established titans like Busoni and Godowsky, and he remained a titan throughout his career. His style was quiet and effortless, imbued with a sense of rhythm and color, grounded in a sovereign technique, and much has been written about his peerless interpretations of Chopin in particular.

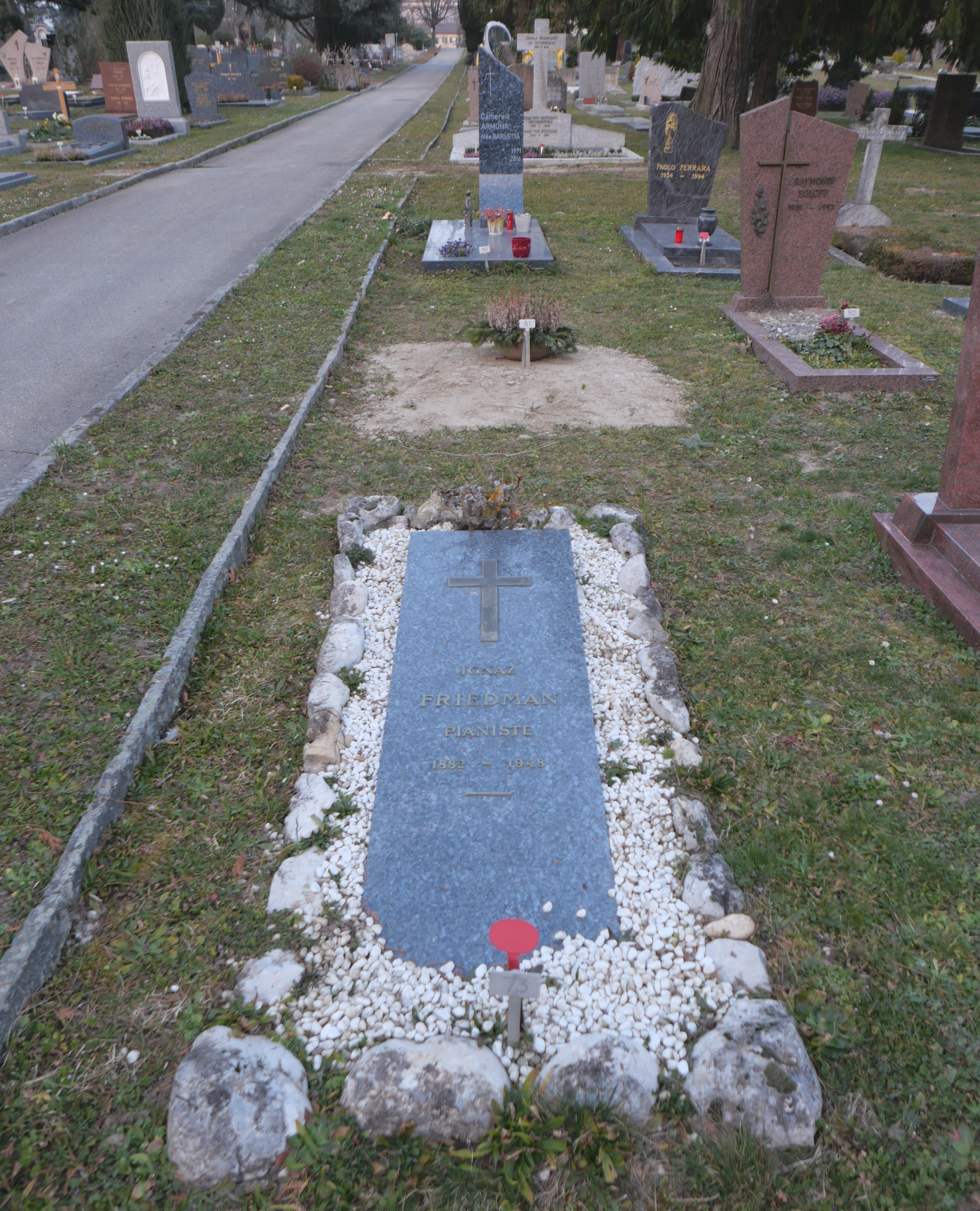
Friedman's grave at the cemetery of Petit-Saconnex in Geneva, Switzerland.

As with his compatriot and contemporary Moriz Rosenthal, Friedman's Chopin interpretations, particularly those of the mazurkas, are considered by many to be unsurpassed. Despite having given 2,800 concerts during his career, he sometimes received lukewarm reviews in America in later years, as younger critics were becoming accustomed to modernist playing which stripped romantic interpretation of its agogics and essence. Rachmaninoff admired Friedman's playing very much and considered him as a great virtuoso in a style more romantic than his own. Friedman was never successful in an America that had adopted a much more modern and straightforward presentation with recording technology that prompted a different sensibility. Therefore, Friedman remains as one of the last representatives of the bygone era even during the life of Rachmaninoff.

According to, his playing may hold the key to understanding the musicianship of the composers he represented. His devotion to the score and the intricate detail through an evolving rubato is Friedman's hallmark.

== Later years and death ==
At the outbreak of the Second World War, Friedman was in Europe, but managed to escape when a concert tour in Australia was offered at the last moment. He settled in Sydney and remained there until his death (which occurred on Australia Day, 1948). His last concert was in Sydney on July 24, 1943, after which neuritis in his left hand forced him to retire from the concert platform.

== Legacy ==
Friedman's relatively few recordings, which have been collected by Naxos Records on five CDs, are widely admired, particularly his Chopin and his nine Songs Without Words by Mendelssohn. Like most of the great artists of his time who broadcast, much of his recorded material has been lost, including hours of radio recordings made in Australia and New Zealand.

He composed more than 90 works, mainly piano miniatures, as well as pieces for cello and a piano quintet, but his compositions have not found a niche in the standard repertory. The complete vocal output (37 songs) was issued as a recording in 2022. Friedman arranged many works, especially those of J. S. Bach and Domenico Scarlatti. He also edited an almost complete edition of the piano works of Chopin and produced editions of Schumann and Liszt.

The Sydney Conservatorium of Music awards an annual Ignaz Friedman Prize for composition.

Friedman also taught several important pianists, including Kurt Engel, Joseph Gurt, Karol Klein, Anna Schytte, Ignace Tiegerman and Bruce Hungerford (who also died in a foreign country on Australia Day).

== Discography ==
=== Releases by Naxos Historical ===
- Vol.1:- BEETHOVEN: 'Moonlight' Sonata / CHOPIN: Mazurkas (8.110684)
- Vol.2:- GRIEG: Piano Concerto / CHOPIN: Sonata in B Flat Minor (8.110686)
- Vol.3:- CHOPIN: Mazurkas (8.110690)
- Vol.4:- MENDELSSOHN: Songs without Words (8.110736)
- Vol.5:- English Columbia Recordings (8.111114)

=== Release by Arbiter ===
- Masters of Chopin (Arbiter 158): Selection including previously unpublished recordings.

=== As Composer ===
- Ignaz Friedman: Piano Works - Michael Schafer (Genuin Classics, 89149)(2009)
- Friedman: Original Piano Compositions - Joseph Banowetz (Grand Piano GP711)(2016)
- Complete Songs - Şen Acar (soprano), Szymon Chojnacki (bass-baritone), Jakub Tchorzewski (piano) Acte Préalable AP0523 (2022)
