= Shehret Feza Hanim =

- First Princess

Princess consort of Egypt
- Tenure: 19 January 1863 – 26 June 1879
- Died: 1895; Cairo, Khedivate of Egypt
- Burial: Al-Rifa'i Mosque
- Consort: Isma'il Pasha of Egypt (died 1895)
- Issue: Princess Tawhida Hanim; Princess Fatima Hanim
Names
- Arabic: شهرت فزا هانم; Turkish: Şöhretfeza Hanım; Ottoman Turkish: شهرت فزا خانم
- House: Alawiyya (by marriage)
- Religion: Sunni Islam

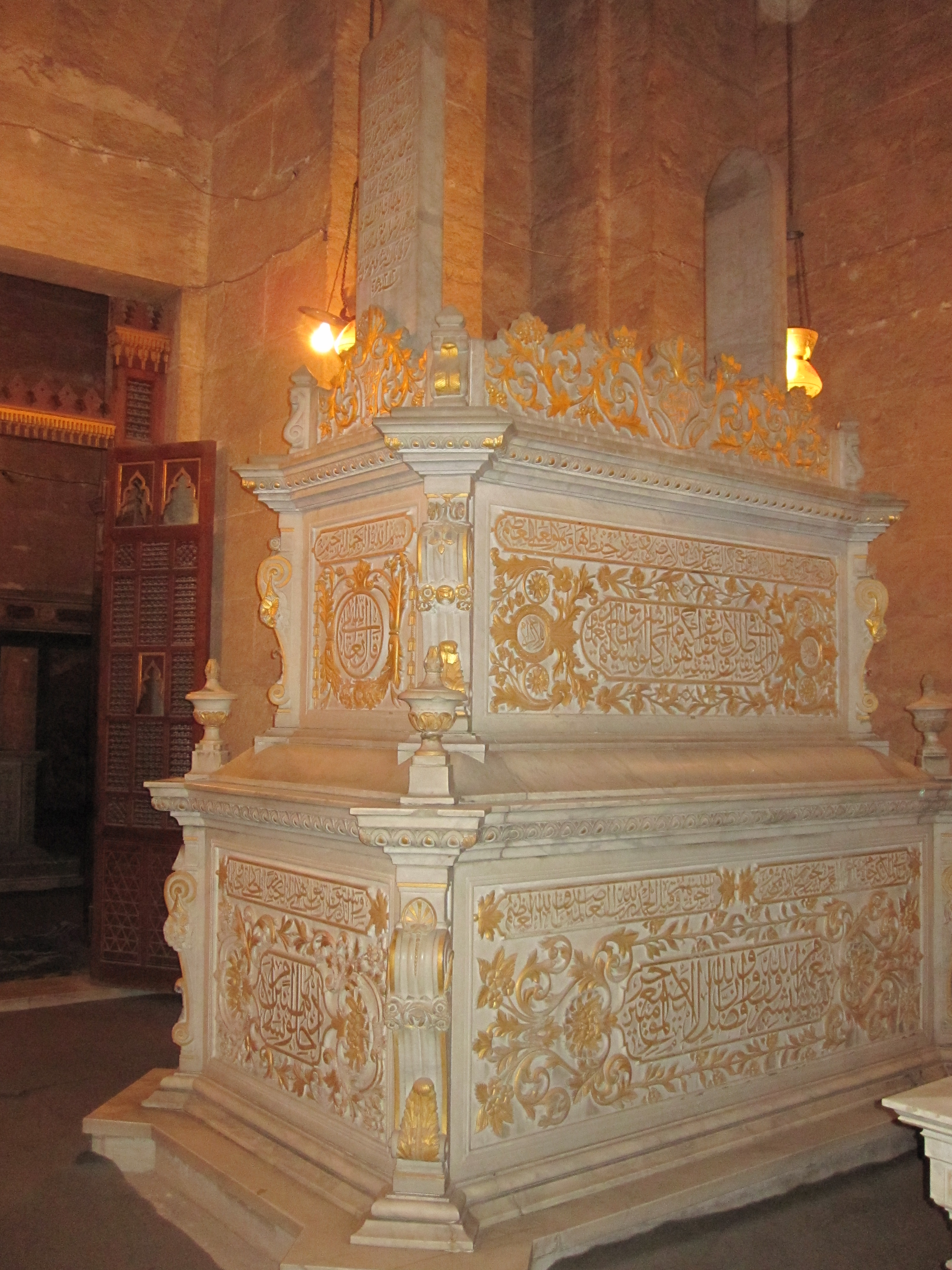
Tomb of Shehret Feza Hanim in Al-Rifa'i Mosque in Cairo

Shehret Feza Hanim (Arabic: شهرت فزا هانم; Turkish: Şöhretfeza Hanım; died 1895; meaning "Empyrean fame") was the first wife of Khedive Isma'il Pasha of Egypt.

== Marriage ==
Of Georgian origin, Shehret Feza married Isma'il Pasha, as his first wife, before his accession to the throne. She gave birth to two daughters, Princess Tawhida Hanim (died 1888) born in 1850, followed by Princess Fatima Hanim (died 1920), born in 1853.

After Isma'il's accession to the throne in 1863, she was given the title of "First Princess", a position at which she remained throughout his entire reign, until his deposition in 1879. In Egypt she was known as Buyuk Hanim or Great Lady. She mostly wore traditional Ottoman garments, featuring a few western details.

After Jamal Nur Qadin's death in 1876, her son, Prince Ali Jamal Pasha was bought up and cared for by Shehret Feza, for whom he never felt more than mildly affectionate gratitude.

== Death ==
Shehret Feza Hanim died in 1895, and was buried in the Khedival Mausoleum, Al-Rifa'i Mosque.

== Honour ==
Foreign honour

- Ottoman Empire: Decoration of the Order of Charity, 1st class, 27 September 1878

== See also ==
- List of consorts of the Muhammad Ali Dynasty

== Source ==
- Doumani, Beshara (2003). Family History in the Middle East: Household, Property, and Gender. SUNY Press. ISBN 978-0-791-48707-5.
