= Kadria Hussein =

Egyptian royal and writer (1988–1955)

Kadria
- Princess of Egypt
- Born: 10 January 1888; Cairo, Khedivate of Egypt
- Died: 1955 (aged 66–67); Cairo, Egypt
- Spouse: Mahmud Khayri Pasha
- House: Muhammad Ali Dynasty
- Father: Hussein Kamel
- Mother: Melek Sultan

Kadria Hussein (Turkish: Kadriye Hüseyin; 1888–1955) was an Egyptian royal and writer. She was the daughter of Hussein Kamel, Sultan of Egypt, who ruled the country between 1914 and 1917. She contributed various magazines, including Shehbal.

== Biography ==
Kadria was born in Cairo on 10 January 1888. Her parents were Hussein Kamel, son of Isma'il Pasha, Khedive of Egypt, and Melek Sultan. She had two younger sisters. Kadria received education in the languages of Arabic and French.

She married Celaleddin Sırrı Bey in 1919 which lasted only for one year. Her second husband was Mahmut Hayri Pasha with whom she married in Emirgan, Istanbul, in 1921. They had two children, a daughter and a son. She returned to Egypt in 1930 when her uncle King Fuad ordered the members of dynasty living abroad to come back Egypt. Before leaving Istanbul she donated her residence, Huber Mansion, to Notre Dame de Sion High School. She was briefly arrested following the 1952 coup which ended the rule of the Muhammad Ali dynasty. Her son was also arrested by the military group who led the coup and was executed in 1956 for his alleged role in the planned coup against them. Kadria left Egypt shortly after her release from prison and lived abroad. She returned to Cairo and died there in 1955.

== Work ==
Kadria published several articles about the women's rights in the magazines based in Istanbul, including Shehbal, Mihrab and Resimli Kitap. She also contributed to a Cairo-based women's magazine L'Égyptienne. In addition, she translated literary works into Turkish. Some of her books include Lettres D'Angora La Sainte (1921), Temevvücât-ı Efkâr (1914) and Muhadderât-ı İslâm (1924; Arabic: Virtuous Ladies of Islam).
