= Shehbal =

Cultural magazine in the Ottoman Empire (1909–1914)

Şehbal
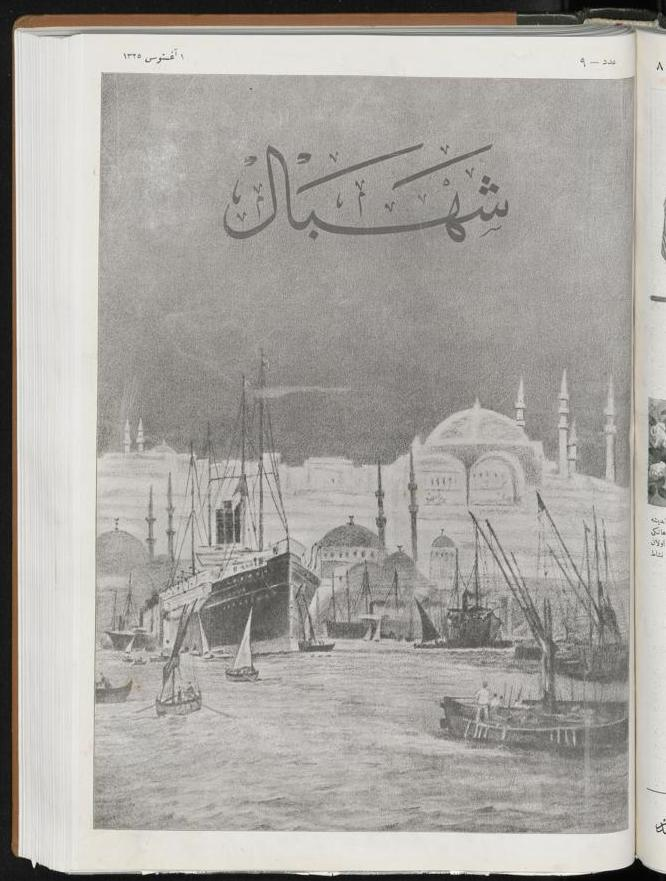
- Editor: Hüseyin Saadeddin Arel
- Categories: Culture magazine
- Frequency: Biweekly
- Founded: 1907
- First issue: 1 March 1907
- Final issue: 1914
- Country: Ottoman Empire
- Based in: Istanbul
- Language: Ottoman Turkish
- Website: Şehbal nbn-resolving.de/urn:nbn:de:hbz:5:1-69615%20Şehbal

The Ottoman journal Shehbal (Ottoman Turkish: شهبال, “wing feather” or “wings“) was published in Istanbul between 1907 and 1914. The first issue appeared on 1 March 1907. Its publisher Hüseyin Saadeddin Arel (1880–1955), technically a lawyer, was a well-known musicologist and composer of 20th-century classical Turkish music. Altogether 100 numbers were issued every two weeks, at the first and fifteenth day of each Maliye-month respectively, totaling 20 pages. The page format more or less equaling the German DIN-size A3 as well as new printing techniques like the three-color printing with countless photographs and illustrations make the journal especially remarkable.

The examples inspiring this journal in its design as well as its content were French magazines like Figaro Salon or L'Illustration. The journal aimed at propagating spiritual as well as technical progress and at covering a wide range of topics with articles on political and social sciences as well as jurisprudence right up to pieces from the fields of natural sciences, technology and philosophy. Furthermore, female readers were informed on parenting, women's rights and their role in society. Pages on the latest historical events were part of the journal as were articles on sports and fine arts. Pieces on music were of special importance, they were mostly accounted for by the editor himself, writing under the pseudonym Bedi Mensi. Entertainment pages featured Ottoman as well as English and American stories and novels. In addition to that, several plays and poems of known writers were printed. Numerous contests involved the readers in the production of the journal and were meant to stimulate cultural life. The winners of those contests which had submitted a composition, photographs, caricatures or translations of operas were honored in award presentation ceremonies. Also, there was a translation competition in order to translate certain French into Ottoman terms. The 100th issue, coming out on 23 July 1914/10 Temmuz 1330 as a special edition, turned out to be the last issue without prior notice.

Contributors of Shehbal included women such as the Egyptian royal Kadria Hussein who published articles using the pseudonym Nilufer, Nigar Hanım, Fatma Aliye and Halide Edib.
