= Ignace Tiegerman =

Ignacy Tiegerman (24 February 1893 – 31 May 1968), usually seen as Ignace, but also Ignaz, was a Polish pianist and teacher.

He was an exceptional interpreter of the Romantic school (Field, Chopin, Brahms, et al.). He studied with Theodor Leschetizky but his lessons with Leschetizky's assistant Ignaz Friedman were more significant. Tiegerman considered Friedman his mentor, and Friedman deemed him "the greatest talent I ever worked with."

His recordings are highly regarded, despite their not being of studio sound quality in most cases. He was said to be the only rival Vladimir Horowitz ever feared. For health reasons, he spent most of his life teaching in Cairo.

His finest pupil was Henri Barda, and he also taught Edward Said, Mario Feninger, Nicolas Constantinidis, and Prince Hassan Aziz Hassan. Hassan called him "a wonder of human realization" and Said later recalled many wonderful late-night conversations with him.
