= Huber Mansion =

Ottoman mansion in Istanbul, Turkey

- Huber Köşkü
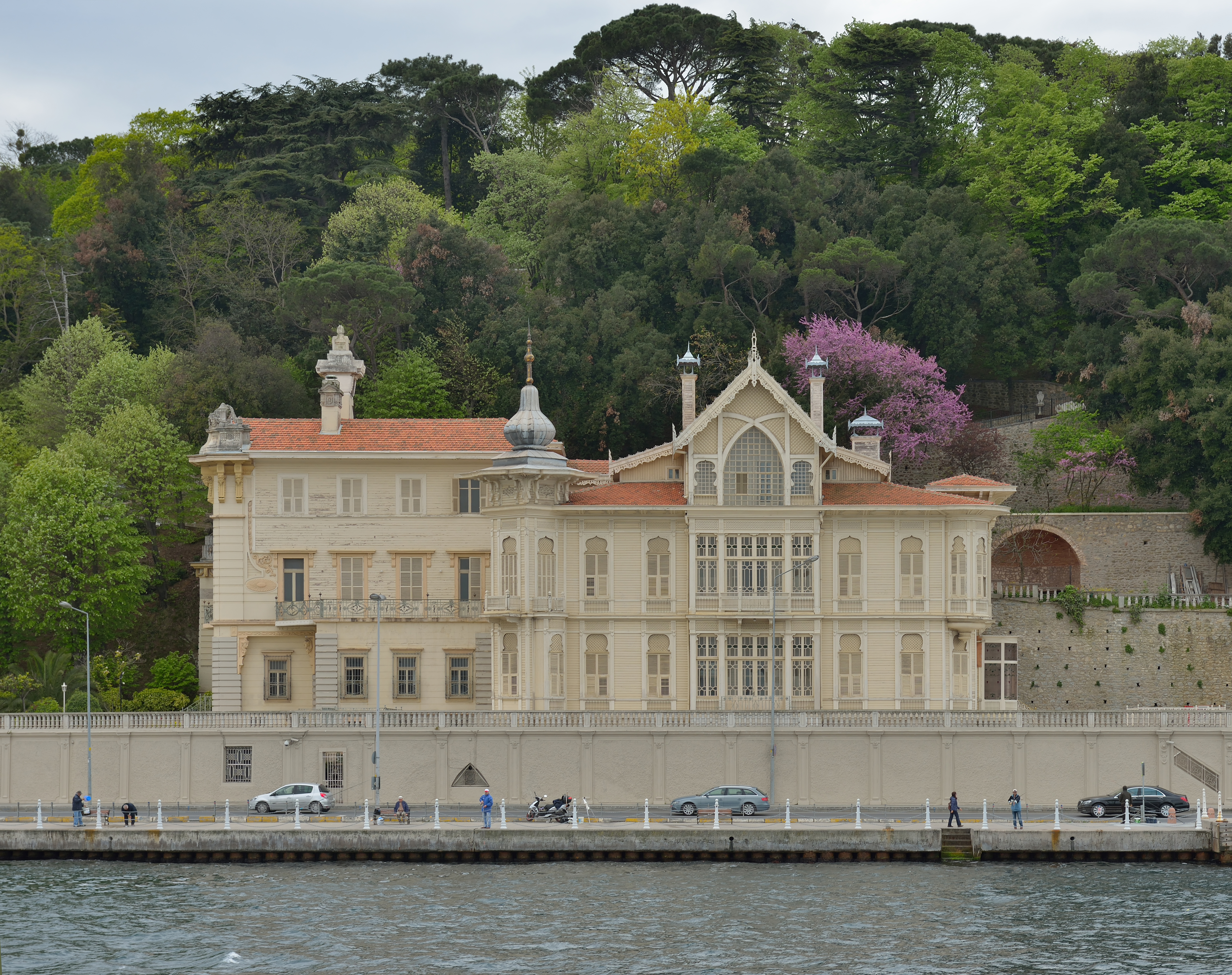

- Location within Istanbul
- Interactive map of the Huber Mansion area

General information
- Type: Residence
- Architectural style: Art Nouveau
- Location: Yeniköy, Sarıyer, Istanbul, Turkey
- Coordinates: 41°08′06″N 29°03′43″E
- Completed: 1890; 136 years ago
- Owner: Presidency of Turkey

Technical details
- Floor count: 3

Design and construction
- Architect: Raimondo D'Aronco

Website
- www.tccb.gov.tr/cumhurbaskanligi/yerleskeler/tarabya_yerleskesi/

Huber Mansion is one of the historical buildings in Yeniköy, Istanbul, Turkey. Built in the late 19th century, it was used as a private residence until 1930 when it was sold to Notre Dame Sion High School. The mansion was nationalized in 1985 and has been used as the residence of the Presidents of Turkey since then.

== History ==
The mansion was bought by Auguste Huber in 1890. He was a representative of the German armament firm Krupp and Mause in Istanbul and the reason for him to buy it was its closeness to the German embassy building. The building was expanded by Raimondo D'Aronco, an Italian architect in 1906. He also redesigned the garden of the mansion which was also employed as a summer residence by the Ottoman Sultan Abdulhamit. Huber had to leave Istanbul following the defeat of the Ottoman Empire in World War I and sold it to Necmeddin Mona. In 1922 the mansion was acquired by Kadria Hussein, daughter of Hussein Kamel who ruled Egypt between 1914 and 1917. Its owner became Lycée Notre Dame de Sion in 1930 when Kadria Hussein left Istanbul for Cairo. The school employed the building until 1973 when it was acquired by a private company. However, the sale occurred without the approval of the Supreme Board of Monuments which led to its nationalization in 1985. The building has been used as the presidential residence and the guesthouse for official visitors since then.

== Technical features and style ==
The mansion covers an area of 340,000 square meters, including a wooded area of 64.000 square meters. The building is within a wooded area in the south of Tarabya Bay. It has a main building surrounded with smaller structures, including a barn, a greenhouse and two small waterfalls. The main building has a large corridor and consists of four blocs. The three blocs were designed by Raimondo D'Aronco as three-story buildings and were connected to the older bloc through a bridge.

Huber Mansion is one of the Art Nouveau buildings in Istanbul.
