= Henri Barda =

French classical pianist

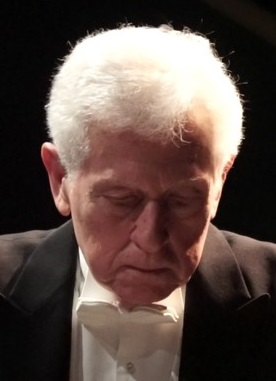
Henri Barda in concert at the Verdun Memorial, 2 July 2022.

Henri Barda is a French classical pianist born in Cairo.

== Biography ==
A student of Polish pianist Ignace Tiegerman, Henri Barda worked in Paris with Lazare Lévy, then entered the Conservatoire de Paris, where he obtained the first prize in piano and chamber music, with the friendship and advice of Joseph Benvenuti, and Jean Hubeau.

He then entered the Juilliard School in New York for four years, where he was taught by Carlos Buhler, Beveridge Webster and Paul Makanovitsky, perfecting his training by attending classes in writing and pedagogy. The diploma he received was accompanied by an exceptional distinction.

Henri Barda has performed in both Europe and the United States, and has toured extensively in Japan, where he performed with the NHK Orchestra.

Invited to numerous festivals in France and abroad, he has made several recordings, notably with Jean-Jacques Kantorow a collection of works for violin and piano by Liszt (Franz Liszt International Prize of Budapest, 1978), as well as the three Chopin Sonatas (Frédéric Chopin International Prize of Warsaw, 1990).

Henri Barda has also collaborated with American choreographer Jerome Robbins, on ballets set to the works by Chopin, performed by Étoiles of the Opéra de Paris. This proved to be a defining experience, leading Barda leading Barda to maintain a close and sustained relationship with dance for over a decade — both on the stage of the Palais Garnier and on international tours.

Henri Barda is professor of piano at the Conservatoire de Paris.

== Discography ==
Rare to discs, Henri Barda has recorded only 6 albums:

- Frédéric Chopin's Piano Sonata No. 1, Piano Sonata No. 2, Piano Sonata No. 3, (CD, Calliope, 1984)
- Maurice Ravel's Piano Trio, Violin Sonata No. 2 (CD, Calliope, 1990)
- Ignace Tiegerman's Meditation (1998)
- Olivier Greif's Sonate n°1 pour violon et piano, Sonate pour piano Codex Domini - Wiener Konzert, Cinq Lieder pour voix et piano - Le Tombeau de Ravel pour piano à quatre Mains - Concert "Live à l'archipel" with Jong Hwa Park (CD, Saphir Productions, 2008)
- Johannes Brahms, Ludwig van Beethoven, Frédéric Chopin, In Japan Kioi Hall, Tokyo, 2008 (CD, Sisyphe Records, 2011)
- Johannes Brahms's Trio pour violon, cor et piano en mi bemol majeur (opus 40), György Ligeti's Trio pour violon, cor et piano (editions Schott)(CD, Musicales - Actes Sud, 1992)
