= Jeshm Afet Hanim =

Wife of Khedive Isma'il Pasha

- Third Princess
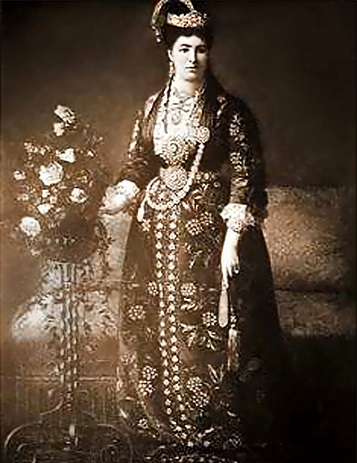

Princess consort of Egypt
- Tenure: 1863 – 26 June 1879
- Born: 1830
- Died: 11 November 1907 (aged 76–77); Khedivate of Egypt
- Burial: Al-Rifa'i Mosque
- Spouse: Isma'il Pasha of Egypt (m. 1863; died 1895)
- Issue: Adopted: Faika Hanim; Melek, Sultana of Egypt
Names
- Arabic: جشم افت هانم; Turkish: Çeşmiafet Hanım; Ottoman Turkish: چشم افت خانم
- House: Alawiyya (by marriage)
- Religion: Sunni Islam

Jeshm Afet Hanim (Arabic: جشم آفت هانم; Turkish: Çeşmiafet Hanım; died 11 November 1907) was the third wife of Khedive Isma'il Pasha of Egypt. She was the adoptive mother of the future Sultana of Egypt, Melek Tourhan.

== Life ==
Jeshm Afet was originally a concubine bought to the harem of the Muhammad Ali dynasty from the Circassian slave trade. She married Isma'il Pasha as his third wife just after his accession to the throne in 1863. She was given the title of "Third Princess", a position at which she remained throughout his entire reign, until his deposition in 1879. In Egypt she was known as Kutschuk Hanim or Little Lady. She mostly wore traditional Ottoman garments, featuring a few western details. She was a poet. In 1869, she met with the Princess of Wales Alexandra of Denmark, when the latter visited Istanbul with her husband Prince of Wales Edward (future Edward VII).

Al-Tahtawi's book on the education of women, titled al-Murshid al-Amin lil Banat wa al-Banin (the faithful guide for girls and boys) published in 1873, was commissioned by Khedive Ismail after Jeshm Afet, used her own money to establish the first general public school for girls at al-Suyufiya in 1873, the Suyufiyya Girls' School, which claimed additional fame to her. The genealogy of the dynasty revealed that Jeshm Afet had no children of her own, which might explain her interest in the education of young girls. She had adopted a daughter, Faika Hanim. She was married to Mustafa Pasha, son of "Mufettish" Isma'il Pasha Sadyk. Immediately after the downfall of her father-in-law, she was divorced by her husband.

Hasan Tourhan Pasha, a captain in the Ottoman Navy offered an adoption of his daughter Melek, in order to improve her lot in life. Melek was adopted by Jeshm Afet, during the 1870s. While they lost touch with each other following the exile of Khedive Ismail, when Melek Hanim became the second wife of Prince Husein Kamel in 1887 returning to Egypt with him, she resumed her acquaintance and a relationship with Aisha Taymur. There was no doubt that the relationship between Jeshm Afet and Taymur was shaped by their mutual interest in women's education and poetry that reflected the changing interests and concerns of some royal and upper-class women beyond mothering and feminine crafts.

Jeshm Afet was widowed at Isma'il's death in 1895. In 1897, she took an active part in the Greco-Turkish War by contributing to the donation collection efforts in Egypt.

== Death ==
Jeshm Afet Hanim died on 11 November 1907, and was buried at the Khedival Mausoleum, Al-Rifa'i Mosque, Cairo, Egypt.

== In popular culture ==
In the 2014 Egyptian historical drama series Saraya Abdeen, Jeshm Afet is portrayed by Egyptian actress Sawsan Arshid.

== Gallery ==
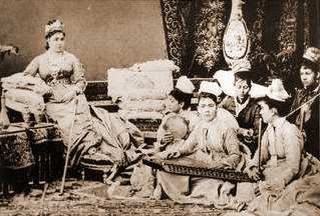
Jeshm Afet Hanim and her female orchestra, circa 1872

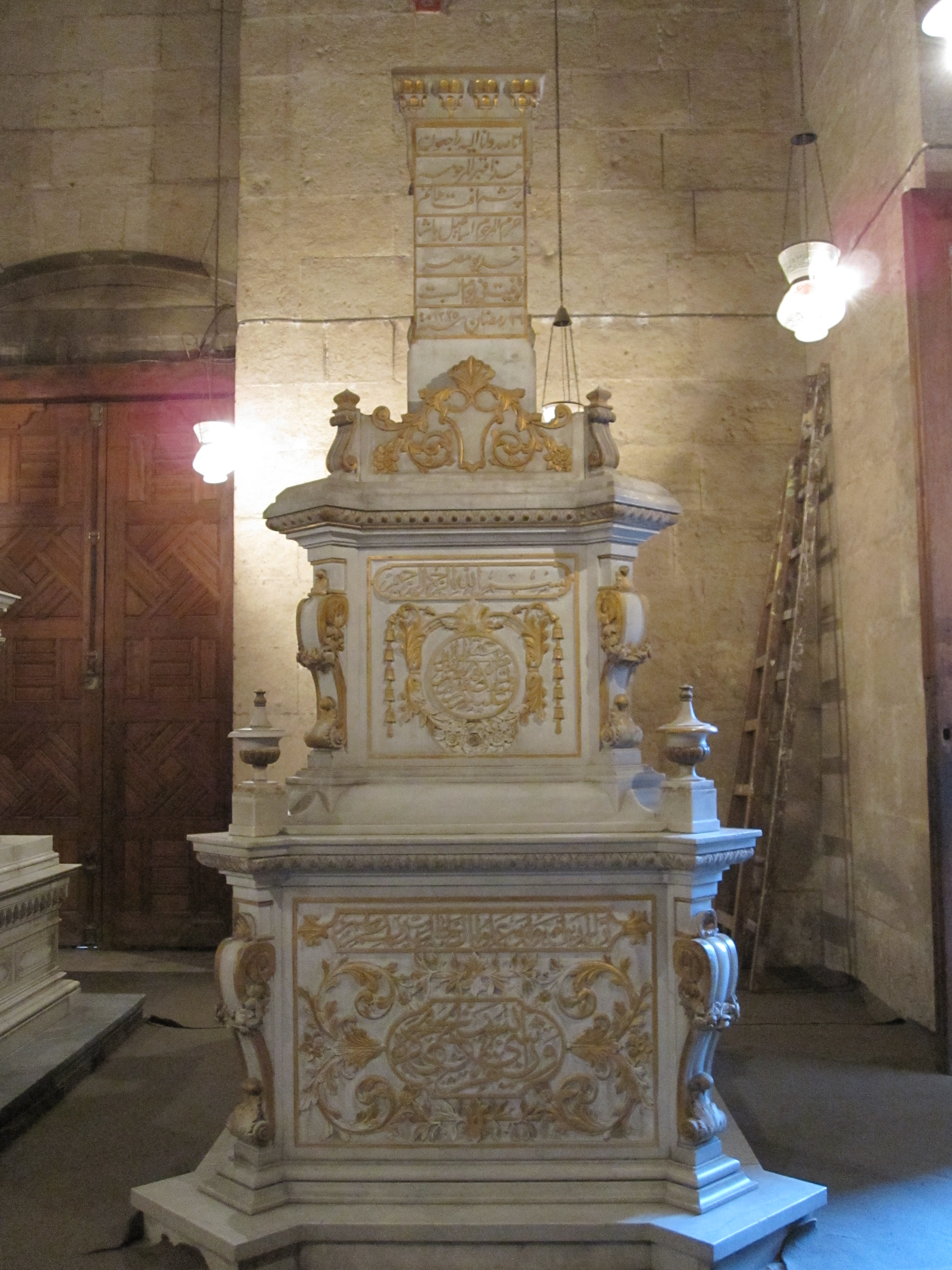
The tomb of Jeshm Afet Hanim

== See also ==
- List of consorts of the Muhammad Ali Dynasty

== Source ==
- Doumani, Beshara (2003). Family History in the Middle East: Household, Property, and Gender. SUNY Press. ISBN 978-0-791-48707-5.
