= Neshedil Qadin =

Consort to Khedive Isma'il Pasha of Egypt

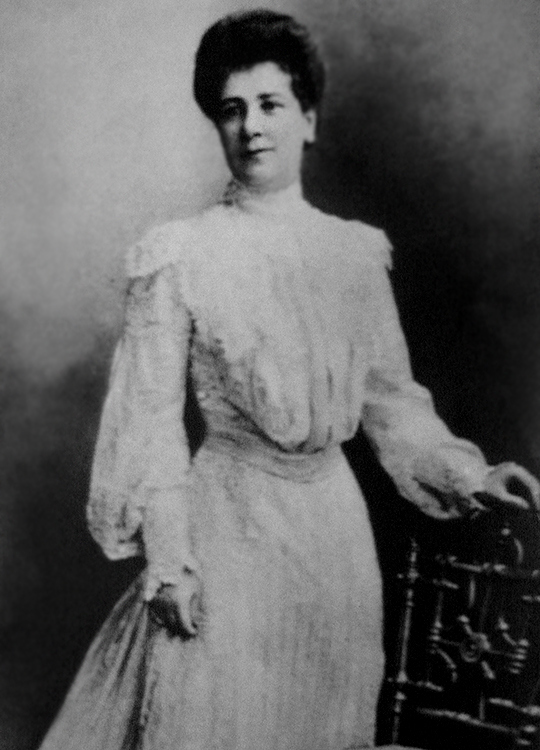
- Born: c. 1857; Caucasus
- Died: 30 January 1924 (aged 66–67); Nice, France
- Burial: Housh Tahir Pasha, grandson of Neshedil
- Spouse: Isma'il Pasha
- Issue: Princess Emina Aziza; Princess Nimetullah; Stillborn son
Names
- Turkish: Neşedil Kadın; Arabic: نشئة دل قادین
- House: Muhammad Ali (by marriage)
- Religion: Sunni Islam

Neshedil Qadin (Turkish: Neşedil Kadın, Arabic: نشئة دل قادین; c. 1857 – 30 January 1924; meaning "Gay-Hearted", "Joy of Soul") was a consort to Khedive Isma'il Pasha of Egypt.

== Early life ==
Born in 1857 in Caucasus, Neshedil was a Circassian, whose early childhood had been spent in the mountains. Disaster overtook the clan when Neshedil was aged seven. She along with her brother were captured during the raid and were sold to a slave dealer in the Circassian slave trade. He took them to Istanbul, where they were separated, and she never again saw or heard of her brother. She herself was brought by the wife of a pasha, who educated her according to the custom of the time. The child was kindly treated, received careful religious instruction, and was taught to read but not to write, as the latter accomplishment might have been an inducement to her penning love letters. She also became an accomplished needlewoman and learned to make the finest lace, oya, and embroidery.

== Life with the Khedive ==
At fifteen she was sold to the Khedive Ismail and went to Egypt. Together with other young Circassians she spent a year in the Guezireh Palace, being trained for a life for court, and was named Neshedil. She was about sixteen Khedive Ismail gave her a separate establishment in the Saffron Palace, with fifty Circassian and thirty Abyssinian slaves of her own. Her clothes, lingerie, and house linen were ordered from Paris. After she had settled in her new surroundings, the Khedive said that it was time for her to go and visit his senior wives at the Abdeen Palace. Trembling inwardly, she went dressed in the finest Brussels lace over a pale blue satin, with a necklace and earrings of rubies and diamonds. Outwardly she maintained her composure and her radiant beauty caused a sensation. Neither of them had expected so much grace and loveliness.

Ismail's unflagging devotion to her raised such a storm of jealousy that after the birth of her second child, during one of her visits to Abdeen, she was served with poisoned coffee. Feeling desperately ill, Neshedil hurried home, nearly dying on the way. The efforts to save her were successful. She slowly came back to life, but never to her former health. After giving birth to a premature son, she was debarred from having other children. Neshedil never mentioned names and disliked to talk about the incident. Ismail was so enraged that he made over to her name the title deeds of the Insha and small Ismailieh Palaces, a gift such as he had never made to any of his former wives, and offered her a set of diamonds, comprising a tiara, with matching earrings, necklace, brooch, belt, bracelets, and rings. He also advised her never again to take food or drink outside her own house. Contrary to his expectations, on receiving his gift Neshedil burst into tears, fell on her knees, and implored him not to give her anything that might cause further jealousy. She firmly refused the jewels, and only when threatened with the Khedive's displeasure reluctantly accepted the palaces. In Saffron Palace two daughters had been born to her, Emina Aziza, in 1874, and Nimetullah, in 1875, both in September.

Jamal Nur Qadin, another of Isma'il Pasha's consorts was the one who gave a slightest twinge to Neshedil.

When Hoshiyar Qadin died in 1885, Neshedil and her daughters went to Naples to rejoin the Khedive Ismail. Four years later, in 1889, the whole family sailed to Emirgan, on the Bosphorus near Istanbul. At Emirgan Neshedil, Princess Emina Aziza and Princess Nimetullah occupied the yali on the Tokmakburnu promontory, one of the seven buildings on Ismail's estate. He himself lived in the largest of four yalis, the other houses being at the disposal of his married sons and daughters, who came to visit him during the warm season.

== Widowhood ==
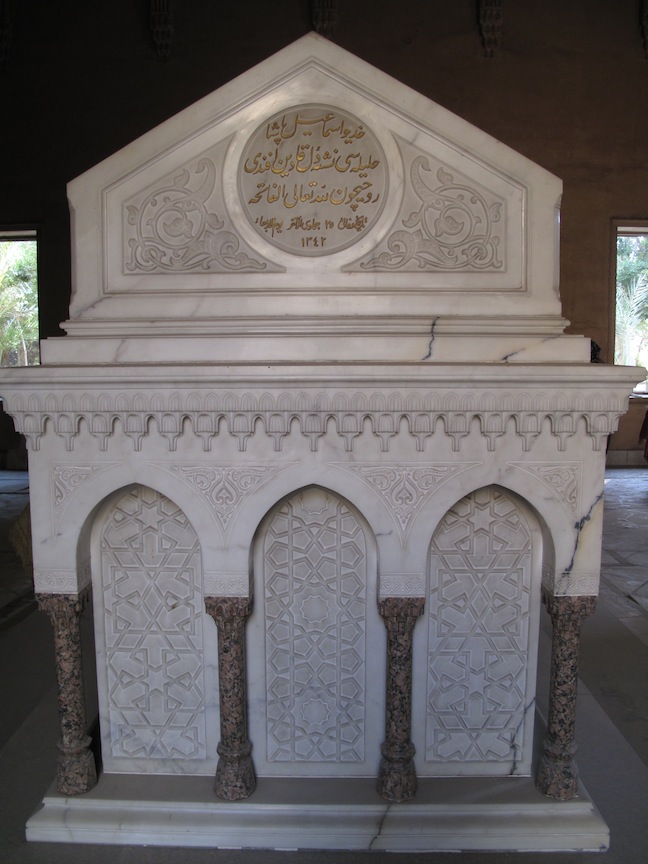
The tomb of Neshedil Qadin

After Isma'il Pasha's death in 1895, Neshedil's health deteriorated, and after months of sick nursing, to fall seriously ill. She eventually recovered, but remained an invalid for the rest of her life. Henceforth she dedicated herself entirely to her daughters and, later, to her grandchildren. After both daughters were married and settled in their own homes, she used to live with either one or the other, but chiefly with the elder, who needed her companionship more. She traveled a great deal on the European continent, with one or both of her daughters, to various spas or towns famous for their doctors, notably in Switzerland. She and her daughter Emina were always under doctor's orders, seeking the health which eluded them.

== Death ==
Neshedil Qadin died in Nice, France, on 30 January 1924, during an operation and was buried at Housh Tahir Pasha, her grandson. The graveyard was later nationalised and is managed by the endowment ministry. Various other families have rented it out. Neshedil's tomb sits in the center of the mausoleum flanked by the tombs of her two daughters and son-in-law.

== In popular culture ==
In the 2014 Egyptian historical drama series Saraya Abdeen, Neshedil is portrayed by Egyptian actress Ghada Adel.

== Sources ==
- Hassan, Hassan (2000). In the House of Muhammad Ali: A Family Album, 1805–1952. American University in Cairo Press. ISBN 978-977-424-554-1. OCLC 45016821.
- Lewis, Reina; Micklewright, Nancy, eds. (July 9, 2006). Gender, Modernity and Liberty: Middle Eastern and Western Women's Writings: A Critical Sourcebook. I.B.Tauris. ISBN 978-1-860-64956-1.
