= Sa'id of Egypt =

Wāli of Egypt and Sudan (1822–1863)

Mohamed Sa'id Pasha
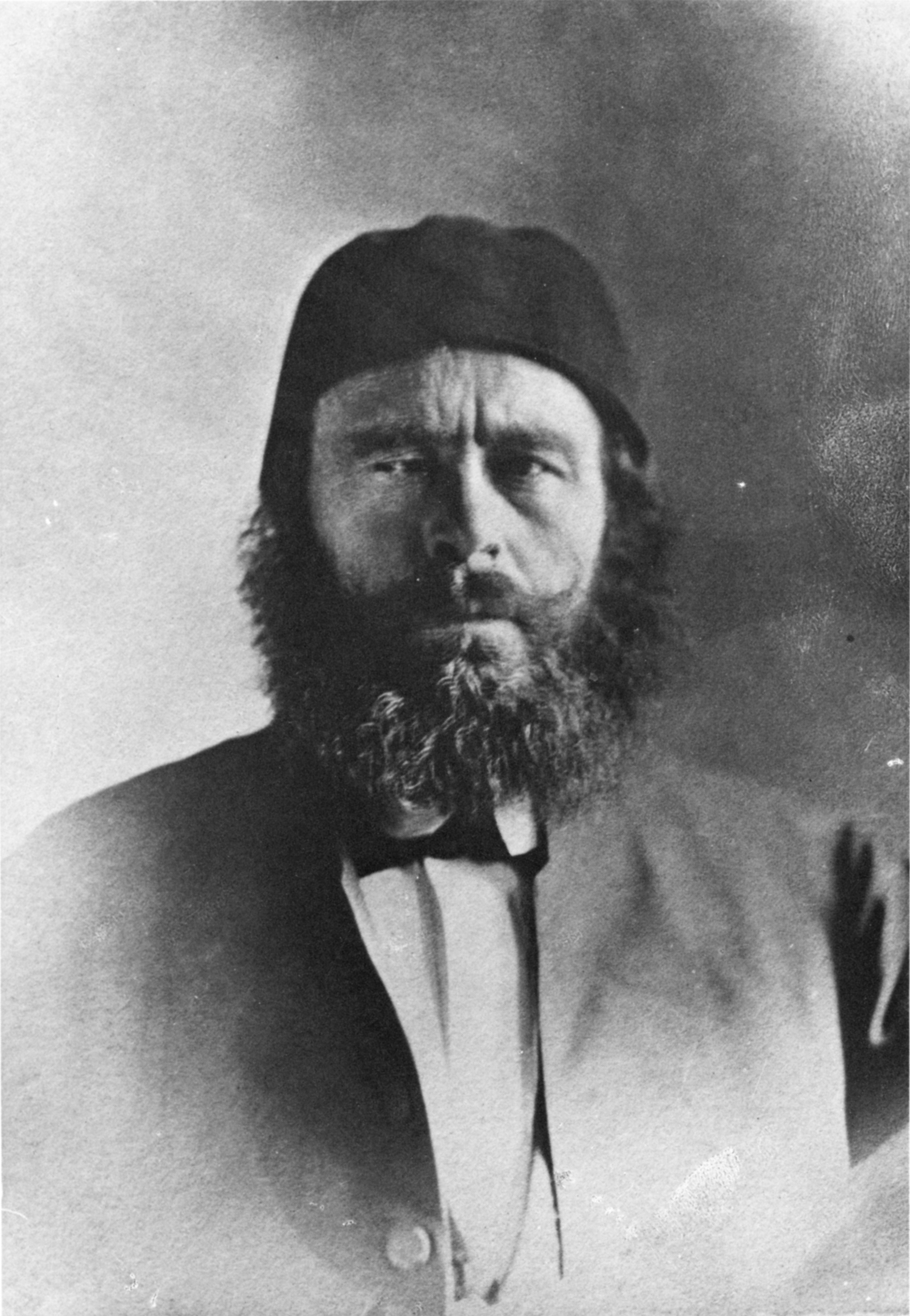
- Sa'id in 1855

Wāli of Egypt
- In office 13 July 1854 – January 1863
- Monarchs: Abdülmecid I Abdulaziz
- Preceded by: Abbas Hilmi I
- Succeeded by: Isma'il

Personal details
- Born: 17 March 1822 Cairo, Egypt Eyalet, Ottoman Empire
- Died: 17 January 1863 (aged 40) Cairo, Egypt Eyalet, Ottoman Empire
- Resting place: Hosh al-Basha, Imam-i Shafi'i Mausoleum, Cairo, Egypt
- Spouse(s): Inji Hanim; Melekber Hanim
- Children: Muhammad Toussoun Pasha; Mahmoud Toussoun Pasha
- Parents: Muhammad Ali Pasha of Egypt (father); Ayn al-Hayat Qadin (mother)
- House: Alawiyya
- Religion: Sunni Islam

Mohamed Sa'id Pasha (Arabic: محمد سعيد باشا, Turkish: Mehmed Said Paşa; March 17 1822 – January 17 1863) was the wāli of Egypt from 1854 to 1863, officially owing fealty to the Ottoman sultan but in practice exercising virtual independence. Construction of the Suez Canal began under his tenure. The Mediterranean port of Port Said is named after him.

A 1886 study described Sa'id as "sociable, witty, extravagant, sensual, and fond of all the delights of life, he seemed rather the gay French courtier than the imperturbable Moslem ruler. He set up a court not unlike that of Louis XIV. He welcomed foreigners and entertained most lavishly. He forgot the sobriety enjoined by the Prophet, so that his dinners and his wines became famed for their richness and excellence."

== Early life ==
He was the fourth son of Muhammad Ali Pasha. Ali Pasha wanted his son to have an athletic body, and to get rid of his obesity, so he ordered his young son to exercise daily for two hours and follow a very simple diet. To safeguard the child's morals, he could visit no other house than that of Mathieu de Lesseps, the French consul. The young prince became friend of Mathieu's son, Ferdinand, and "both of them revelled in devouring immense quantities of spaghetti. This intimacy and his longing for pasta caused Muhammad Said to hurry to the French consulate whenever the frugal diet of the viceregal table left a void in his stomach". Then, the young Egyptian was sent there to complete his education in Paris, where he again frequented the Lesseps' household.

== Reign ==
Under Sa'id's rule there were several law, land and tax reforms. Some modernization of Egyptian and Sudanese infrastructure also occurred using western loans. In 1854, he established the Bank of Egypt. In the same year Egypt's first standard gauge railway was opened, between Kafr el-Zayyat on the Rosetta branch of the Nile and Alexandria. In addition, he founded the Medjidieh, a precursor to the Khedivial Mail Line.

In 1854 the first act of concession of land for the Suez Canal was granted, to a French businessman, his old friend Ferdinand de Lesseps. The British opposed a Frenchman building the canal and persuaded the Ottoman Empire to deny its permission for two years. Sa'id signed the concession to build a canal on January 5, 1856, and oversaw the Egyptian portion of its construction.

Sudan had been conquered by his father in 1821 and incorporated into his Egyptian realm, mainly in order to seize slaves for his army. Slave raids (the annual 'razzia') also ventured beyond Sudan into Kordofan and Ethiopia. Facing European pressure to abolish official Egyptian slave raids in the Sudan, Sa'id issued a decree banning raids. Freelance slave traders ignored his decree. Under Sa'id's rule, the influence of sheikhs was curbed, and many Bedouin reverted to nomadic raiding.

When the American Civil War brought a cotton famine, the export of Egyptian cotton surged during Sa'id's rule to become the main source for European mills. At the behest of Napoleon III in 1863, Sa'id dispatched part of a Sudanese battalion as part of the Imperialist coalition in support of the Second Mexican Empire during the Second French intervention in Mexico.

== Death and succession ==
Sa'id's heir presumptive, Ahmad Rifaat, drowned in 1858 at Kafr el-Zayyat when a railway train on which he was travelling fell off a car float into the Nile. Therefore, when Sa'id died in January 1863 he was succeeded by his nephew Isma'il.

He was buried in Hosh al-Basha the Royal Mausoleum of Imam al-Shafi'i, Cairo, Egypt.

== Family ==
He married twice, to a first wife Inji Hanim with one son Ahmed Sherif Pasha, and to a second wife Melekber Hanim with two sons, Mahmoud Bey, and Mohamed Toussoun Pasha.

== Honours ==
- Belgium: Grand Cordon of the Order of Leopold (civil), 26 January 1855
- French Empire: Grand Cross of the Legion of Honour, 1863
- Ottoman Empire:
  - Order of Glory
  - Order of Osmanieh, Special Class
  - Order of the Medjidie, Special Class, 1853
- Tuscany: Grand Cross of St. Joseph, 1856
- Netherlands: Grand Cross of the Netherlands Lion, 1856

== Sources ==
- Karabell, Zachary (2003). Parting the desert: the creation of the Suez Canal. Alfred A. Knopf. ISBN 0-375-40883-5.

Sa'id of Egypt Muhammad Ali Dynasty Born: 1822 Died: 1863
Preceded by Abbas I	Wāli of Egypt and Sudan; 1854–1863	Succeeded by Isma'il
