= Hassan Aziz Hassan =

Egyptian prince (1924–2000)

Prince Hassan Aziz Hassan (Arabic: حسن عزيز حسن, also known as Nabil Hassan Aziz Hassan; February 22, 1924 – April 17, 2000) was an Egyptian prince. He was one of the last surviving members of the Muhammad Ali Dynasty. He held the title of "El-Nabil" (the noble prince, in Arabic), which was also his name at birth.

Having been educated in Beirut and England at Leighton Park School, he was a painter and pianist, and was a student and close friend of the expatriate Polish concert pianist Ignaz Tiegerman and of the artists Fabrizio Clerici and Leonor Fini who portrayed it.

Hassan was born in Sanremo, Italy, a great-grandson of the Khedive Ismail and a cousin of King Farouk of Egypt, the country's last king. His father, Prince Aziz, a brother of King Fuad I, was a founder of the Wafd Party, and his mother was Spanish.

He had two sisters, Princess Khadijah and Princess Aicha, and a brother, Ismail. Unlike many other members of the Egyptian royal family, he remained in Egypt following the Egyptian Revolution of 1952, living in an apartment with one of his sisters, with whom he did not speak for years. He died in 2000, in Cairo, Egypt, at the age of 76.
