= Al-Rifa'i Mosque =

Mosque in Cairo, Egypt

- مسجد الرفاعي
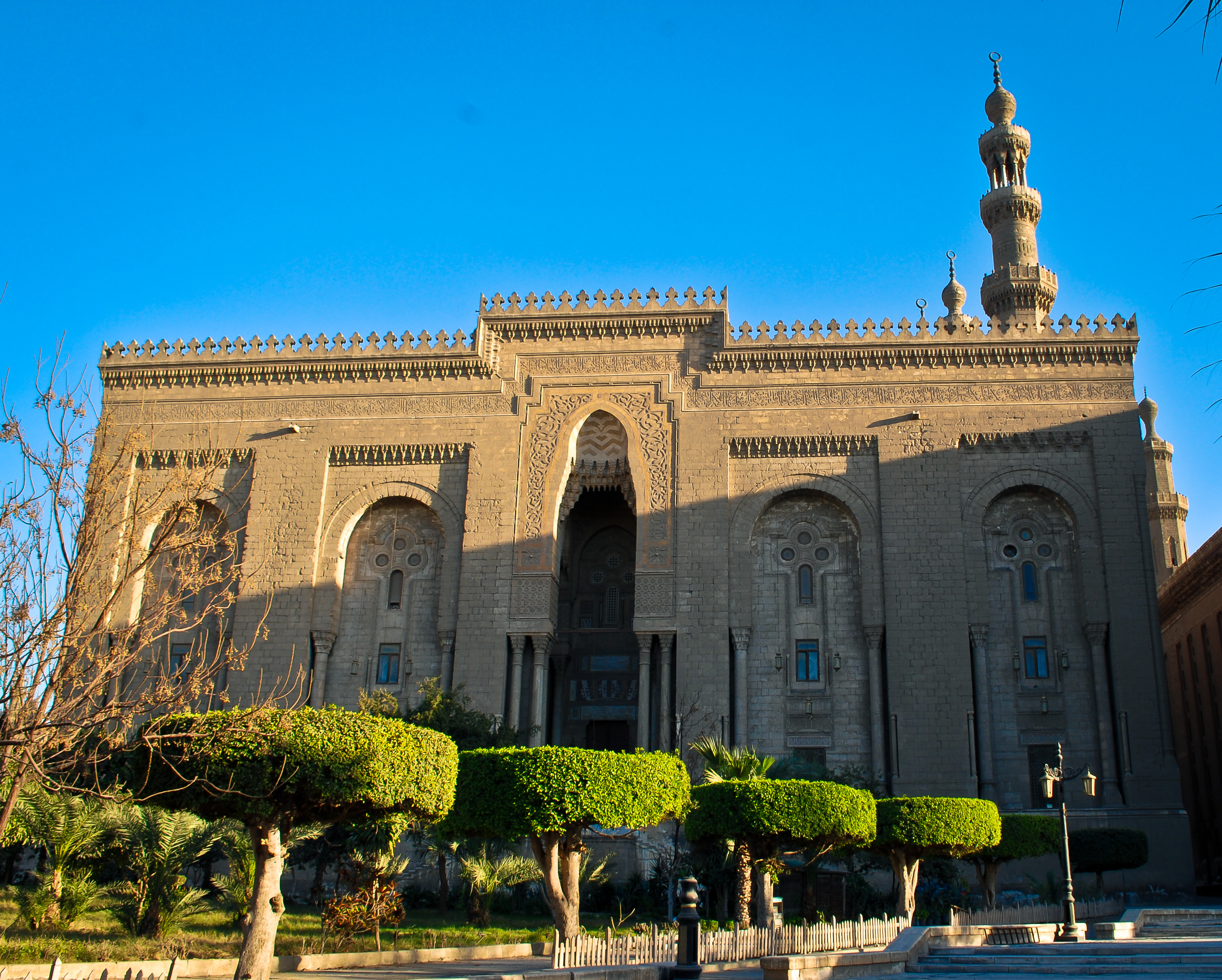

Religion
- Affiliation: Sunni Islam
- Sect: Sufism (Rifaʽi)
- Ecclesiastical or organisational status: Mosque and mausoleum
- Status: Active

Location
- Location: Citadel Square, Islamic Cairo
- Country: Egypt
- Interactive map of Al-Rifa'i Mosque
- Coordinates: 30°9′17″N 31°18′37″E

Architecture
- Architects: Hussein Fahmi Pasha; Max Herz
- Type: Mosque
- Style: Neo-Mamluk
- Completed: 1912

Specifications
- Capacity: 10,000 worshipers
- Interior area: 6,500 m^{2} (70,000 sq ft)
- Dome: 1
- Minaret: 2
- Shrine: 1: Ali Abu Shubbak
- Materials: Stone; marble

The Al-Rifa'i Mosque (Arabic: مسجد الرفاعي, romanized: Al-Rifai, lit. 'Refaai Mosque') (Note: Also transliterated as Al-Refai, Al-Refa'i, and locally known as El-Refa'i.) is a mosque located in Citadel Square, adjacent to the Citadel, in Islamic Cairo, Egypt. Its name is derived from the Ali Abu Shubbak who is buried in the mosque. It also serves as the royal mausoleum of Muhammad Ali's family. The building is located opposite the Mosque-Madrasa of Sultan Hassan, which dates from around 1361, and was architecturally conceived as a complement to the older structure as part of a vast campaign by the 19th century rulers of Egypt to both associate themselves with the perceived glory of earlier periods in Egypt's Islamic history and modernize the city.

== History ==
The original structure on the site was a small 12th century Fatimid-era mosque, known as the Al-Dakhirah Mosque. But later, the grandson of Ahmad al-Rifa'i, Ali Abu Shubbak al-Rifa'i, was buried within it, and the place was converted into a Zawiya for the Rifa'i tariqah. This Zawiya became known as the Al-Bayda Zawiya, and it not only contained the tomb of Ali Abu Shubbak, but also included the tomb of another Sufi mystic, Yahya al-Ansari.

The present structure of the Al-Rifa'i Mosque was constructed in two phases over the period between 1869 and 1912 when it was finally completed. It was originally commissioned for Hoshiyar Qadin, the mother of the 19th century Khedive Isma'il Pasha to expand and replace the old Zawiya. Hoshiyar ordered an extensive renovation of the zawiya, and so the original structure save for the graves of Ali Abu Shubbak and Yahya al-Ansari was demolished. The new structure was also intended to contain the burial place of the Khedive family.

The original architect was Hussein Fahmi Pasha, a distant cousin in the dynasty founded by Muhammad Ali of Egypt in 1803, but he died during the first phase of construction, and work was halted after the abdication of Khedive Isma'il Pasha in 1880. Hoshiyar Qadin herself died in 1885, and work was not resumed until 1905 when the new Khedive, Abbas II of Egypt, ordered its completion. Construction work was supervised by the Hungarian architect Max Herz, head of the Committee for the Conservation of the Monuments of Cairo.

== Architecture ==
The mosque was designed in a Neo-Mamluk style, which was fashionable in Cairo at the time and which referenced historic Mamluk architecture. When developing its design, the architects of Al-Rifai Mosque tried to match the Sultan Hassan Mosque next to it in grandeur and height even though they faced some difficulties that were criticized by archaeologists and which were remedied under the supervision of Max Herz.

The interior area of the mosque is 6,500 square metres (70,000 sq ft), the part designated for prayer is 1,767 square metres (19,020 sq ft), and the rest of the space is allocated for the zawiya shrine and the royal mausoleum. The mosque has two minarets built on circular bases, like the minarets of the Sultan Hassan Mosque. As for the entrances, they are towering and surrounded by stone and marble columns with Arabic capitals. Their lintels are decorated with marble, and their tops are also covered with polished and gilded arches.

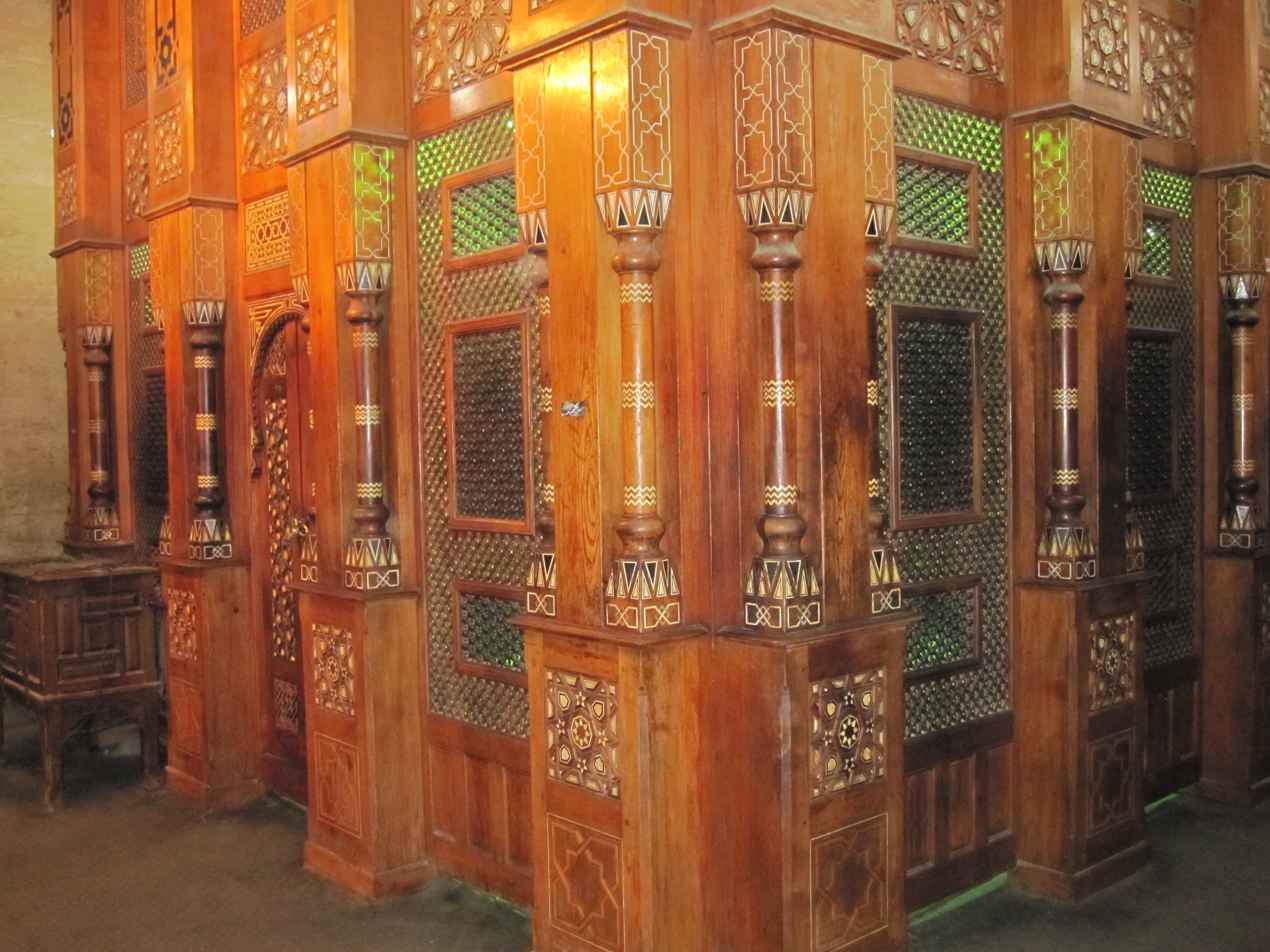
The wooden enclosure over the grave of Ali Abu Shubbak al-Rifa'i within the mosque

In the middle of the western side is the entrance to the royal mausoleum, which is surrounded by stone columns with ornate marble bases. To the right of the interior of this mausoleum is the tomb of Fuad I of Egypt in the western front corner of the mosque. It is covered with colored marble, and adjacent to it is the tomb of his mother, Ferial Qadin. At the end of the room, there is a door, which leads to another room that contains the tomb of Sheikh Ali Abu Shubbak Al-Rifa'i. This room is topped by a dome. The grave is covered by a wooden zarih built around it. Between the two front doors is a smaller entrance leading to a room which holds the grave of Yahya Al-Ansari.

== Usage ==
The mosque is the resting place of Ali Abu Shubbak, an important saint of the Rifa'i order who is also regarded as one of the Ahl al-Bayt, hence it is a very important place for pilgrimage.

It also contains the royal mausoleum of the Khedive family, where Hoshiyar Qadim and her son Ismail Pasha, as well as other members of Egypt's royal family, including Sultan Hussein Kamel, Sultan and King Fuad I, and King Farouk, are buried. Khedive Tewfik and Khedive Abbas II Hilmi, however, are buried in Qubbat Afandina, a mausoleum built in 1894 in Cairo's Eastern Cemetery, together with other late members of the Muhammad Ali Dynasty.

The mosque served briefly as the resting place of Reza Pahlavi of Iran, who died in exile in the Union of South Africa in 1944, and was returned to Iran after World War II. Part of the burial chamber is also occupied by Reza Pahlavi's son Mohammad Reza Pahlavi, who died in Cairo in July 1980. He was buried in Cairo following the Iranian Revolution of 1979 which was spearheaded by Ayatollah Ruhollah Khomeini.

== Burials ==
=== Sufi mystics ===
- Ali Abu Shubbak al-Rifa'i, mystic of the Rifa'i order and grandson of Ahmad al-Rifa'i.
- Yahya al-Ansari, patron saint of Cairo.

=== Royal family of Egypt ===
- Hoshiyar Qadin, Walida Pasha
- Ismail Pasha of Egypt, Khedive
- Jeshm Afet Hanim, wife of Khedive Ismail
- Shehret Feza Hanim, wife of Khedive Ismail
- Jananiyar Hanim, wife of Khedive Ismail
- Prince Ali Jamal al-Din, son of Khedive Ismail
- Princess Zainab Hanim, daughter of Khedive Ismail
- Hussein Kamel of Egypt, Sultan
- Fuad I of Egypt, King
- Farouk of Egypt, King
- Fawzia of Egypt, daughter of Fuad I

=== Pahlavi dynasty ===
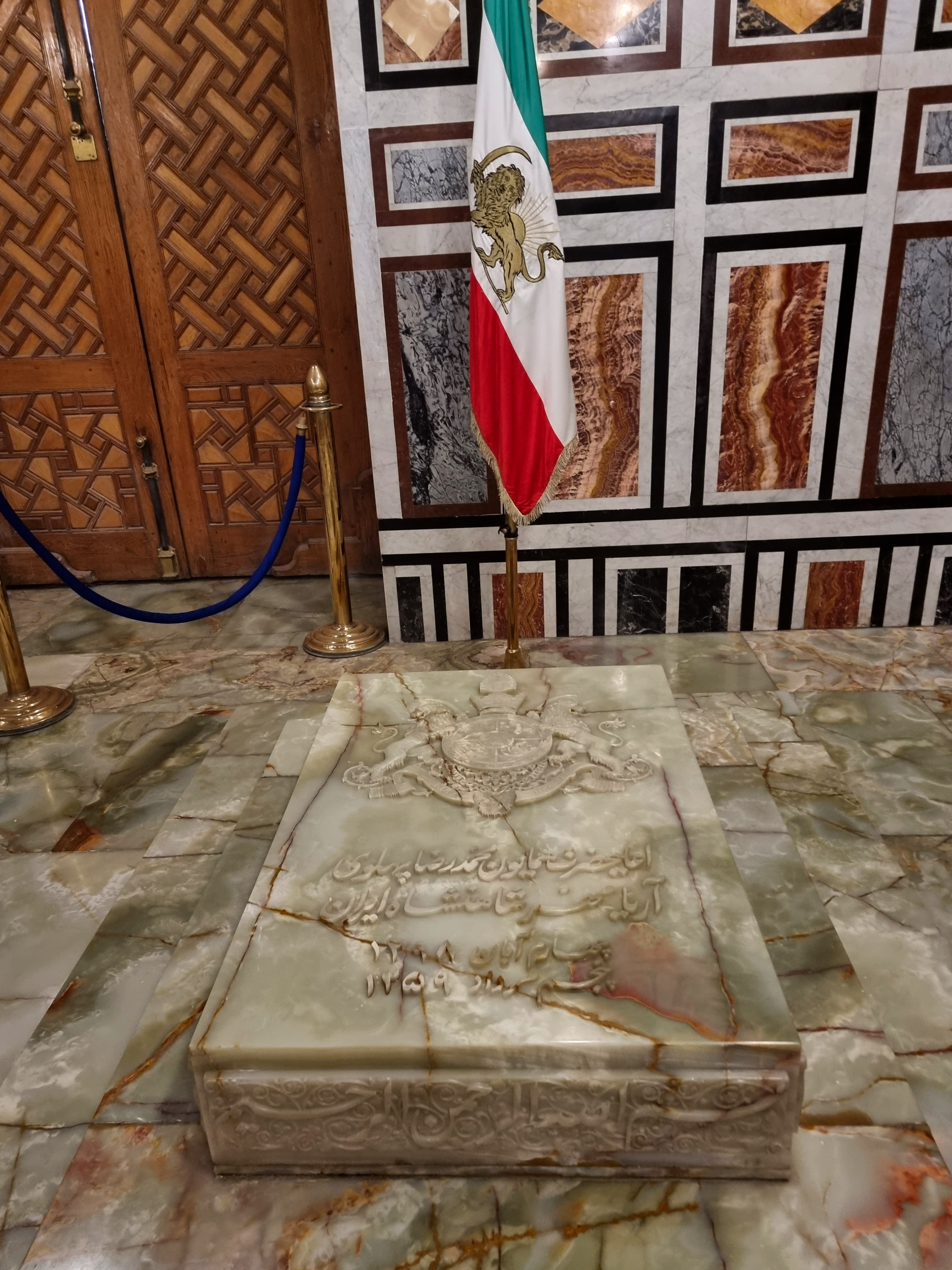
Tomb of Mohammad Reza Pahlavi

- Reza Shah Pahlavi, founder of the Pahlavi dynasty. His body was removed in 1950 and reburied in Iran.
- Mohammad Reza Pahlavi, last Shah of Iran

== See also ==
- Islam in Egypt
- List of mausoleums in Cairo
- List of mosques in Cairo
- Muhammad Ali Dynasty family tree
