= Isma'il Pasha of Egypt =

Khedive of Egypt and Sudan from 1863 to 1879

Isma'il Pasha إسماعيل باشا
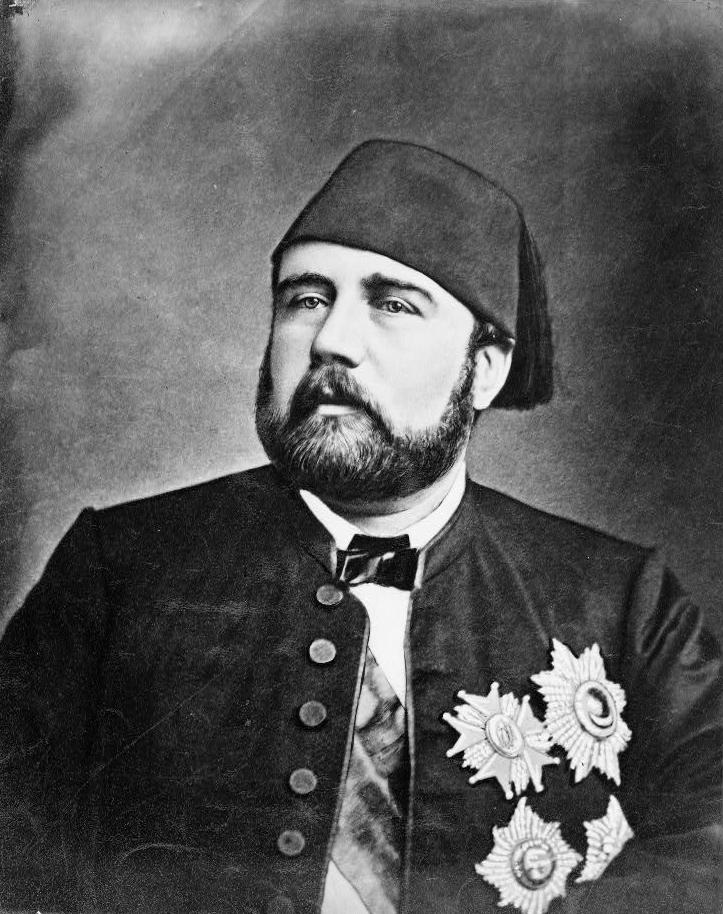

Khedive of Egypt and Sudan
- Reign: 19 January 1863 – 26 June 1879
- Predecessor: Sa'id (as Wāli) (unrecognized Khedive of Egypt)
- Successor: Tewfik
- Born: 31 December 1830; Cairo, Egypt Eyalet, Ottoman Empire
- Died: 2 March 1895 (aged 64); Constantinople, Ottoman Empire
- Burial: Al-Rifa'i Mosque, Cairo, Egypt
- Spouse: Shehret Feza Hanim; Jananiyar Hanim; Jeshm Afet Hanim; Shafaq Nur Hanim; Gulhiste Hanim; Gulendam Hanim; Nur Felek Qadin; Misl Melek Qadin; Jihan Shah Qadin; Bezmi Alem Qadin; Hur Jenan Qadin; Jamal Nur Qadin; Ferial Qadin; Misl Jihan Qadin; Neshedil Qadin; Felek Naz Qadin
- Issue: Tewfik, Khedive of Egypt; Hussein Kamel of Egypt; Fuad I of Egypt; Prince Ibrahim Ilhami Pasha; Prince Ali Jamal Pasha; Prince Hassan Ismail Pasha; Prince Mahmud Hamdi Pasha; Prince Reshid Ismail Bey; Princess Tawhida Hanim; Princess Fatima Hanim; Princess Zainab Hanim; Princess Jamila Fadila Hanim; Princess Amina Hanim; Princess Nimetullah Hanim; Princess Amina Aziza Hanim
- House: Alawiyya
- Father: Ibrahim Pasha of Egypt
- Mother: Hoshiyar Qadin
- Religion: Sunni Islam

Isma'il Pasha (Arabic: إسماعيل باشا Ismā‘īl Bāshā; 25 November 1830 or 31 December 1830 – 2 March 1895), also known as Ismail the Magnificent, was the Khedive of Egypt and ruler of Sudan from 1863 to 1879, when he was removed at the behest of Great Britain and France. Sharing the outlook of his grandfather, Muhammad Ali Pasha, he made Egypt and Sudan more competitive during his reign, investing heavily in industry, urbanization, and the expansion of the country's boundaries in Africa.

In 1867, in exchange for a hefty financial compensation to the Ottoman sultan, he secured a firman for the recognition for his title of Khedive ('great master' or 'sovereign prince') in preference to wāli (governor), which was previously used by his predecessors in the Eyalet of Egypt and Sudan (1517–1867), and also for the exclusivity of the transfer of this title to only his direct descendants, thereby excluding all other members of Muhammed Ali's family from the line of succession. However, Isma'il's policies placed the Khedivate of Egypt and Sudan (1867–1914) in severe debt, leading to the sale of the country's shares in the Suez Canal Company to the British government, and his ultimate toppling from power in 1879 under British and French pressure. The city of Ismailia is named in his honour.

== Family ==
The second of the three sons of Ibrahim Pasha, and the grandson of Muhammad Ali, of Albanian descent, Isma'il was born in Cairo at Al Musafir Khana Palace. His mother was Circassian, Hoshiyar Qadin, the third wife of his father. Hoshiyar Qadin (also known as Khushiyar Qadin) is reported to be the sister of Pertevniyal Sultan, mother of the Ottoman Sultan Abdulaziz, who ruled from 1861 to 1876 and who also was deposed at the behest of the western powers. Thus, Isma'il Pasha was ruling Egypt and Sudan for the entire period when his cousin, Abdulaziz, was ruling the Ottoman Empire.

== Youth and education ==
After receiving a European education in Paris where he attended the École d'état-major, he returned home, and on the death of his elder brother became heir to his uncle, Sa'id, the wāli of Egypt and Sudan. Sa'id, who apparently conceived his safety to lie in ridding himself as much as possible of the presence of his nephew, employed him in the next few years on missions abroad, notably to the Pope, the Emperor Napoleon III, and the Sultan of the Ottoman Empire. In 1861 he was dispatched at the head of an army of 18,000 to quell an insurrection in Sudan, a mission which he accomplished.

== Khedive of Egypt ==
After the death of Sa'id, Isma'il was proclaimed Khedive on 19 January 1863, though the Ottoman Empire and the other Great Powers recognized him only as Wāli. Like all Egyptian and Sudanese rulers since his grandfather Muhammad Ali Pasha, he claimed the higher title of Khedive, which the Sublime Porte had consistently refused to sanction. Finally, in 1867, Isma'il succeeded in persuading the Ottoman Sultan Abdülaziz to grant a firman finally recognizing him as Khedive in exchange for an increase in the tribute, because of the Khedive's help in the Cretan revolt between 1866 and 1869. Another firman changed the law of succession to direct descent from father to son rather than brother to brother, and a further decree in 1873 confirmed the virtual independence of the Khedivate of Egypt from the Porte.

=== Reforms ===
Isma'il spent heavily—some went to bribes to Constantinople to facilitate his reform projects. Much of the money went for the construction of the Suez Canal. About £46 million went to construct 8,000 miles (13,000 km) of irrigation canals to help modernize agriculture. He built over 900 miles (1,400 km) of railroads, 5,000 miles (8,000 km) of telegraph lines, 400 bridges, harbor works in Alexandria, and 4,500 schools. The national debt rose from £3 million to about £90 million, in a country with 5 million population and an annual treasury revenue of about £8 million.

Isma'il launched vast schemes of internal reform on the scale of his grandfather, remodeling the customs system and the post office, stimulating commercial progress, creating a sugar industry, building the cotton industry, building palaces, entertaining lavishly, and maintaining an opera and a theatre. Over one hundred thousand Europeans came to work in Cairo, where he facilitated building an entire new quarter of the city on its western edge modeled on Paris. Alexandria was also developed. He launched a vast railroad building project that saw Egypt and Sudan rise from having virtually none to the most railways per habitable kilometer of any nation in the world.

Education reform increased the education budget more than tenfold. Traditional primary and secondary schools were expanded and specialized technical and vocational schools were created. Students were once again sent to Europe to study on educational missions, encouraging the formation of a Western-trained elite. A national library was founded in 1871.

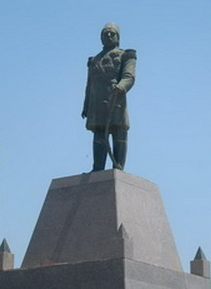
Isma'il Pasha Statue in Alexandria, Egypt

One of his most significant achievements was to establish an assembly of delegates in November 1866. Though this was supposed to be a purely advisory body, its members eventually came to have an important influence on governmental affairs. Village headmen dominated the assembly and came to exert increasing political and economic influence over the countryside and the central government. This was shown in 1876 when the assembly persuaded Isma'il to reinstate the law (enacted by him in 1871 to raise money and later repealed) that allowed landownership and tax privileges to persons paying six years' land tax in advance.

Isma'il tried to reduce slave trading and with the advice and financial backing of Yacoub Cattaui extended Egypt's rule in Africa. In 1874 he annexed Darfur, but was prevented from expanding into Ethiopia after his army was repeatedly defeated by Emperor Yohannes IV, first at Gundet on 16 November 1875, and again at Gura in March of the following year.

=== War with Ethiopia ===
Isma'il dreamt of expanding his realm across the entire Nile including its diverse sources, and over the whole African coast of the Red Sea. This, together with rumours about rich raw material and fertile soil, led Isma'il to expansive policies directed against Ethiopia under the Emperor Yohannes IV. In 1865 the Ottoman Sublime Porte ceded the African portion of the Habesh Eyalet (with Massawa and Suakin at the Red Sea as the main cities of that province) to Isma'il. This province, which neighboured Ethiopia, first consisted of a coastal strip only but expanded subsequently inland into territory controlled by the Ethiopian ruler. Here Isma'il occupied regions originally claimed by the Ottomans when they had established the province (eyalet) of Habesh in the 16th century. New economically promising projects, like huge cotton plantations in the Barka delta, were started. In 1872 Bogos (with the city of Keren) was annexed by the governor of the new "Province of Eastern Sudan and the Red Sea Coast", Werner Munzinger Pasha. In October 1875 Isma'il's army tried to occupy the adjacent highlands of Hamasien, which were then tributary to the Ethiopian Emperor, and suffered defeat at the Battle of Gundet. In March 1876 Isma'il's army tried again and suffered a second dramatic defeat by Yohannes's army at Gura. Isma'il's son Hassan was captured by the Ethiopians and only released after a large ransom. This was followed by a long cold war, only finishing in 1884 with the Anglo-Egyptian-Ethiopian Hewett Treaty, when Bogos was given back to Ethiopia. The Red Sea Province created by Ismail and his governor Munzinger Pasha was taken over by the Italians shortly thereafter and became the territorial basis for the Colony of Eritrea (proclaimed in 1890).

=== Khedive's Somali Coast ===
The jurisdiction of Isma'il Pasha from the 1870s until 1884 included the entire northern coast of Somalia, up to the eastern coast at Ras Hafun in contemporary Puntland. The Khedive's northern Somali Coast territory was reached as far inland as Harar, although it was subsequently ceded to Britain in 1884 due to internal difficulties of Egypt.

=== Suez Canal ===
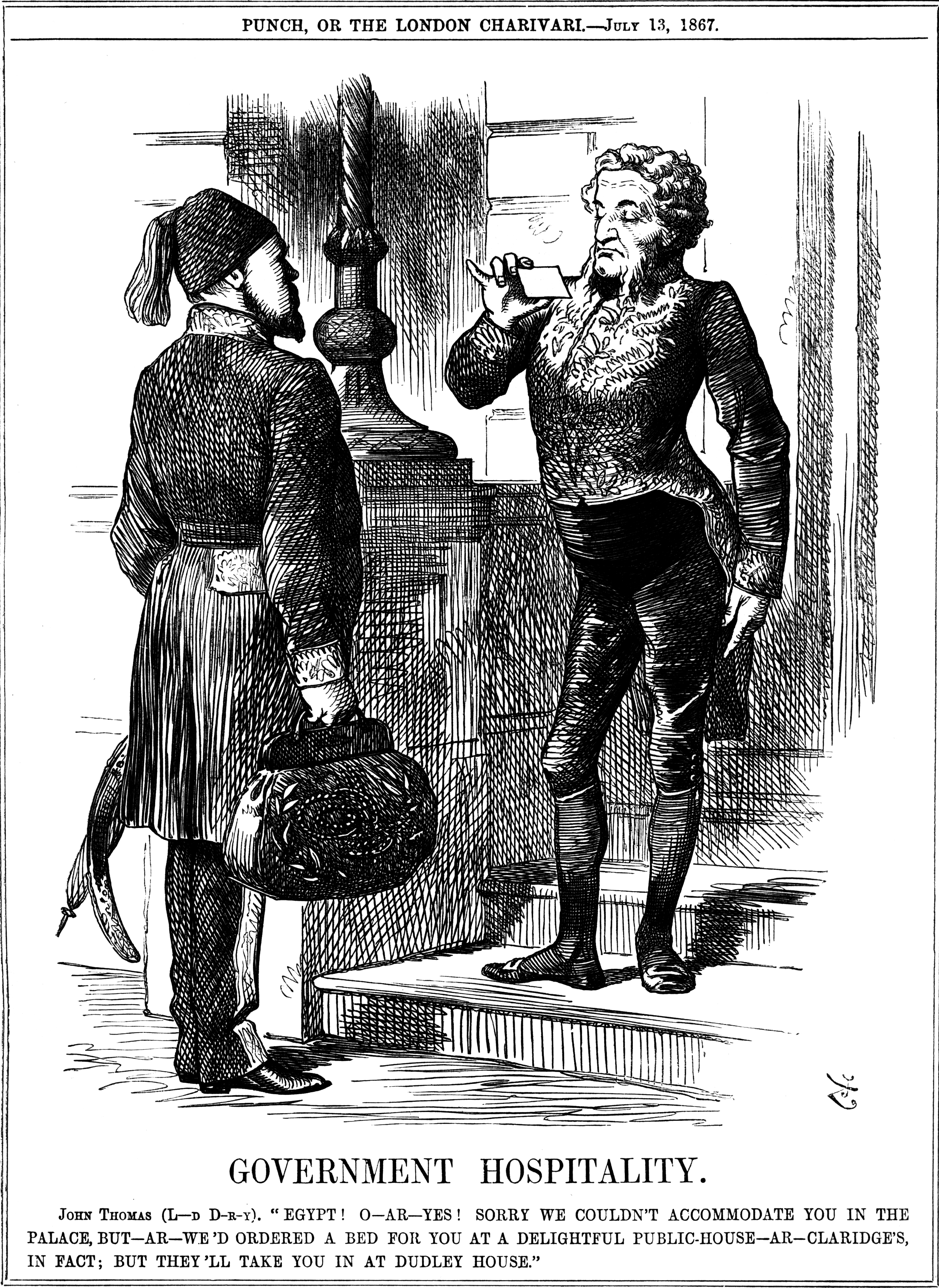
Punch cartoon featuring Isma'il Pasha during his visit to Britain in 1867

Isma'il's khedivate is closely connected to the building of the Suez Canal. He agreed to, and oversaw, the Egyptian portion of its construction. On his accession, at the behest of Yacoub Cattaui his minister of Finance and close advisor, he refused to ratify the concessions to the Canal company made by Sa'id, and the question was referred in 1864 to the arbitration of Napoleon III, who awarded £3,800,000 to the company as compensation for the losses they would incur by the changes which Isma'il insisted upon in the original grant. Isma'il then used every available means, by his own undoubted powers of fascination and by judicious expenditure, to bring his personality before the foreign sovereigns and public, and he had much success. In 1867 he visited Paris during the Exposition Universelle with Sultan Abdülaziz, and also London, where he was received by Queen Victoria and welcomed by the Lord Mayor. While in Britain he also saw a British Royal Navy Fleet Review with the Sultan. In 1869 he again paid a visit to Britain. When the Canal finally opened, Isma'il held a festival of unprecedented scope, most of it financed by the Cattaui banking house, from whom he borrowed $1,000,000, inviting dignitaries from around the world.

=== Debts ===
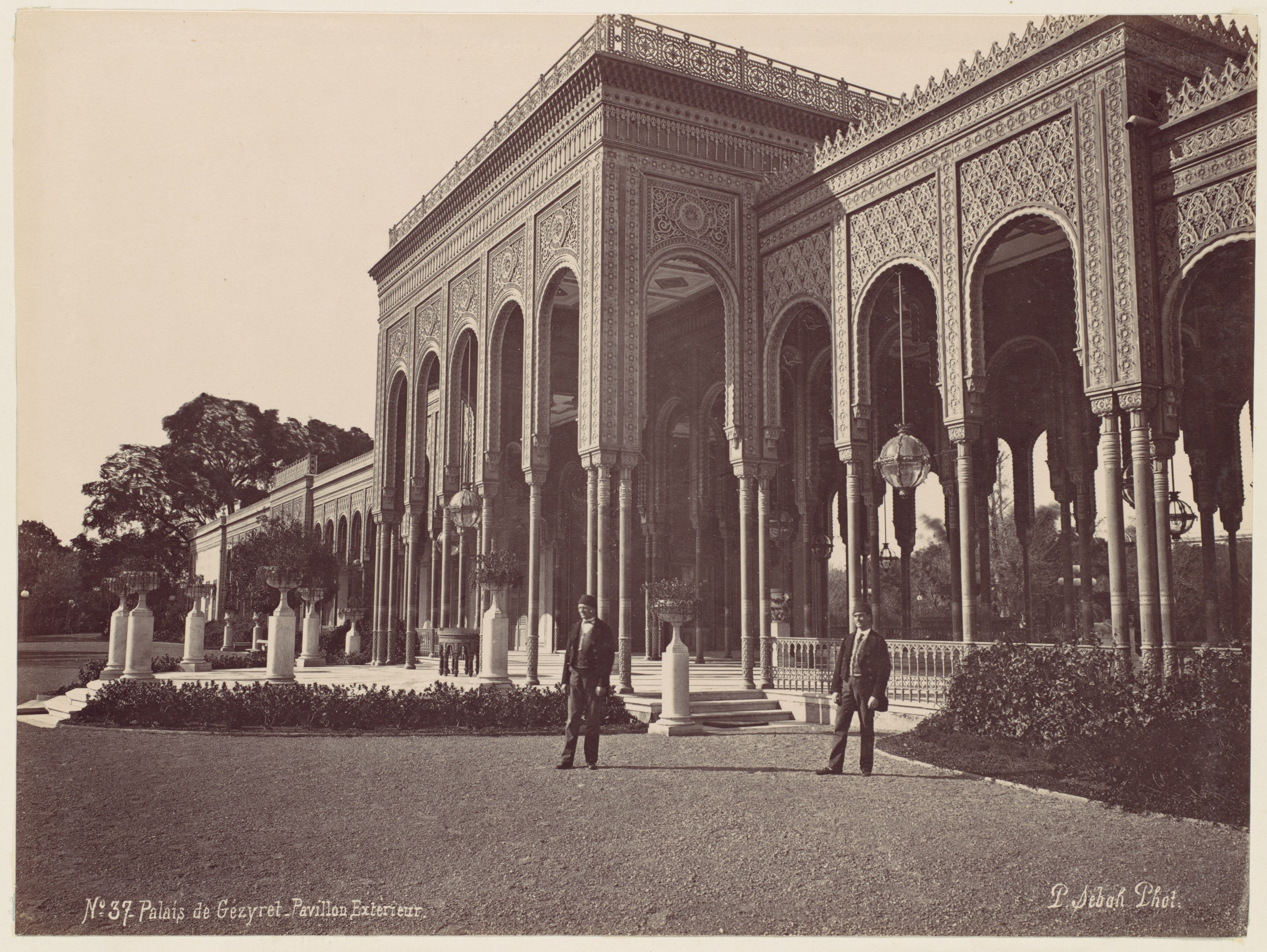
Pavillion of the Gezirah Palace, commissioned by Khedive Isma'il to receive foreign leaders for the occasion of the inauguration of the Suez Canal. Among the events was the premiere of Giuseppe Verdi's opera Aida.

These developments – especially the costly war with Ethiopia – left Egypt in deep debt to the European powers, and they used this position to wring concessions out of Isma'il. One of the most unpopular among Egyptians and Sudanese was the new system of mixed courts, by which Europeans were tried by judges from their own states, rather than by Egyptian and Sudanese courts. But at length the inevitable financial crisis came. A national debt of over £100 million sterling (as opposed to three millions when he acceded to the throne) had been incurred by the Khedive, whose fundamental idea of liquidating his borrowings was to borrow at increased interest. The bond-holders became restive, chief among them the House of Cattaui. Judgments were given against the Khedive in the international tribunals. When he could raise no more loans, he sold the Egyptian and Sudanese shares in the Suez Canal Company in 1875 with the assistance of Yacoub Cattaui to the British government for £3,976,582; this was immediately followed by the beginning of direct intervention by the Great Powers in Egypt and Sudan.

In December 1875, Stephen Cave and John Stokes were sent out by the British government to inquire into the finances of Egypt, and in April 1876 their report was published, advising that in view of the waste and extravagance it was necessary for foreign Powers to interfere in order to restore credit. The result was the establishment of the Caisse de la Dette. A subsequent investigation in October by George Goschen and Joubert resulted in the establishment of joint Anglo-French control over most of the Egyptian government's finances. A further commission of inquiry by Major Evelyn Baring (afterwards 1st Earl of Cromer) and others in 1878 culminated in Isma'il handing over much of his personal estates' to the nation and accepting the position of a constitutional sovereign, with Nubar as premier, Charles Rivers Wilson as finance minister, and de Blignières as minister of public works.

As the historian Eugene Rogan has observed, "the irony of the situation was that Egypt had embarked on its development schemes to secure independence from Ottoman and European domination. Yet with each new concession, the government of Egypt made itself more vulnerable to European encroachment."

== Deposition by Abdulhamid and exile ==
Isma'il's "Yellow Pavilion" in Emirgan

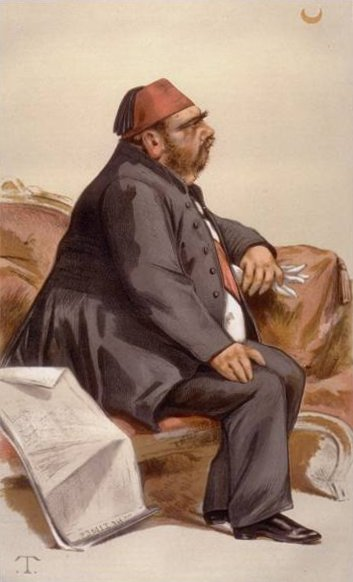
"The ex-Khedive" as depicted by Théobald Chartran in Vanity Fair, May 1881

This control of the country by Europeans was unacceptable to many Egyptians, who united behind a disaffected Colonel Ahmed Urabi. The Urabi revolt consumed Egypt. Hoping the revolt could relieve him of European control, Isma'il did little to oppose Urabi and gave into his demands to dissolve the government. Britain and France took the matter seriously, and insisted in May 1879 on the reinstatement of the British and French ministers. With the country largely in the hands of Urabi, Isma'il could not agree, and had little interest in doing so. As a result, the British, and French governments pressured the Ottoman Sultan Abdülhamid II to depose Isma'il Pasha, and this was done on 26 June 1879. The more pliable Tewfik Pasha, Ismail's eldest son, was made his successor. Isma'il Pasha left Egypt and initially went into exile to Resina, today Ercolano near Naples, until 1885 when he was eventually permitted by Sultan Abdülhamid II to retire to his palace in Emirgan on the Bosporus in Constantinople. There he remained, more or less a state prisoner, until his death. He was later buried in Cairo.

== Language of the administration ==
During his reign, Ismail replaced Ottoman Turkish with Egyptian Arabic as the language of the administration, in a move to further mark the independence of Egypt relative to Constantinople. On 25 November 1866, during the inauguration of Egypt's first parliament, Ismail gave the commencement speech to the assembly in Arabic. In the following decades, Arabic would further expand and eventually replace Turkish in the army and in administration, leaving Turkish to be used only in correspondence with the Ottoman Sultan in Constantinople.

== Honours ==
- (Ottoman Empire) Order of Glory, Nichan Iftikhar
- (Belgium) Grand Cordon (civil) of the Order of Leopold, 10 February 1863
- (Ottoman Empire) Order of Nobility, Special Class, 1863
- (Ottoman Empire) Order of Osmanieh, Special class, 1863
- (Austrian Empire) Grand Cross of the Imperial Order of Leopold, 1864
- (Second Mexican Empire) Grand Cross of the Imperial Order of the Mexican Eagle, 1865
- (Sweden) Commander Grand Cross of the Order of the Sword, 27 July 1866
- (United Kingdom of Great Britain and Ireland) Honorary Grand Cross (civil) of the Order of the Bath, 18 December 1866
- Grand Cross of the Order of the Netherlands Lion, 1866
- (Kingdom of Italy) Knight of the Supreme Order of the Most Holy Annunciation, 29 January 1867
- (Second French Empire) Grand Cross of the Legion d'Honneur, 1867
- (United Kingdom of Great Britain and Ireland) Honorary Grand Commander of the Order of the Star of India, 27 August 1868
- Knight of the Order of the Black Eagle, 30 December 1868
- Grand Cross of the Order of the Red Eagle, 3 April 1865
- (Denmark) Grand Cross of the Order of the Dannebrog, 3 November 1869
- (Kingdom of Italy) Grand Cross of the Order of Saints Maurice and Lazarus, 1869
- (Kingdom of Italy) Grand Cross of the Order of the Crown of Italy, 1869
- (Greece) Grand Cross of the Order of the Redeemer, 1869
- (Austria-Hungary) Grand Cross of the Order of St. Stephen, 1869
- (Saxe-Coburg and Gotha) (Duchy of Saxe-Altenburg) (Saxe-Meiningen) Grand Cross of the Saxe-Ernestine House Order, 1872
- (Kingdom of Bavaria) Honorary member: Bavarian Academy of Sciences and Humanities, 1874
- (Grand Duchy of Oldenburg) Grand Cross of the House and Merit Order of Peter Frederick Louis, with Golden Crown, 5 February 1875
- (Sultanate of Zanzibar) Order of the Brilliant Star of Zanzibar, 1st Class, 1875
- Order of the Brilliant Star of Egypt, 1st Class, 1875

Isma'il Pasha of Egypt Muhammad Ali Dynasty Born: 31 December 1830 Died: 2 March 1895
Regnal titles
| Preceded by Sa'id | Wali and Khedive of Egypt and Sudan; 1863–1867 | Recognized as Khedive |
| New title Previously Wali and Khedive | Khedive of Egypt and Sudan; 1867–1879 | Succeeded by Tewfik Pasha |
