= Boutros Boutros-Ghali =

UN Secretary-General, 1992–1996

- بطرس بطرس غالي
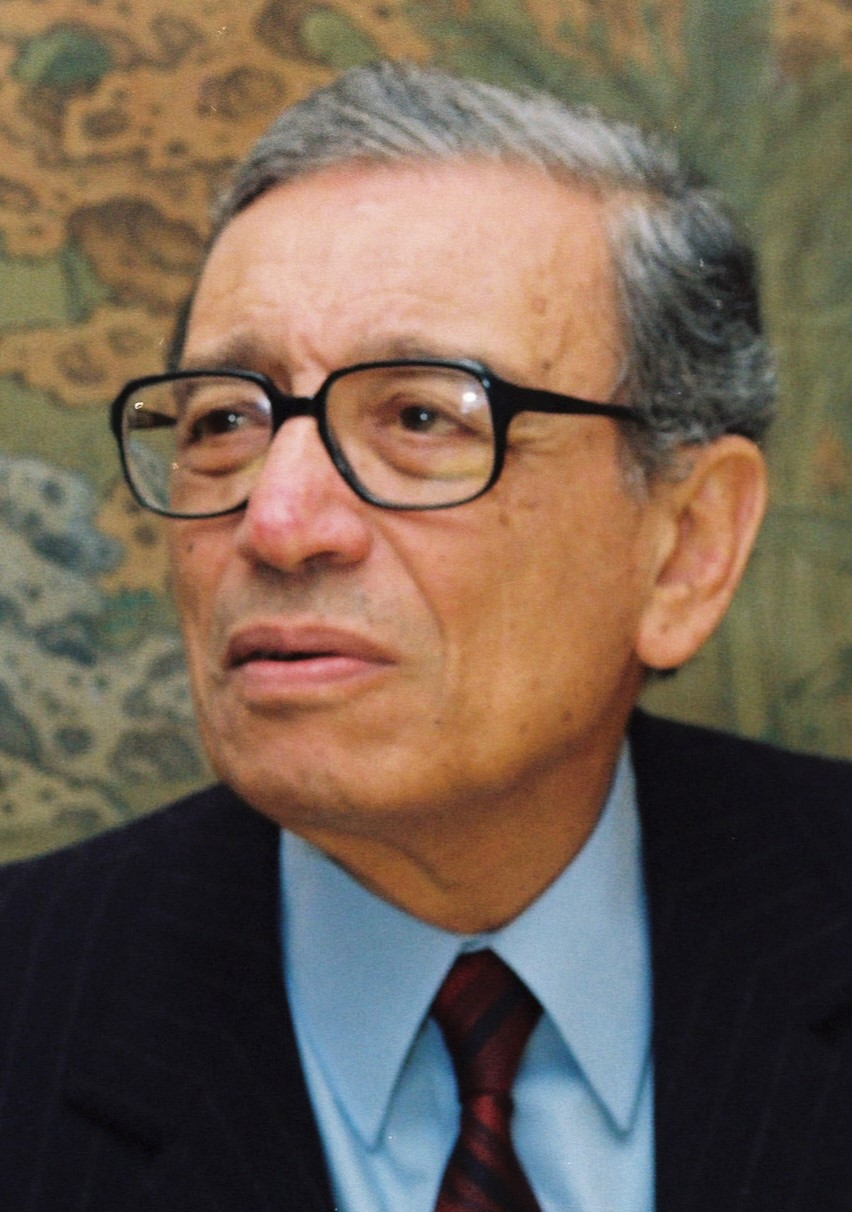
- Boutros-Ghali in 1993

6th Secretary-General of the United Nations
- In office 1 January 1992 – 31 December 1996
- Preceded by: Javier Pérez de Cuéllar
- Succeeded by: Kofi Annan

Secretary-General of La Francophonie
- In office 16 November 1997 – 31 December 2002
- Preceded by: Jean-Louis Roy (ACCT)
- Succeeded by: Abdou Diouf

Acting Minister of Foreign Affairs
- In office 17 September 1978 – 17 February 1979
- Prime Minister: Mamdouh Salem; Mustafa Khalil
- Preceded by: Muhammad Ibrahim Kamel
- Succeeded by: Mustafa Khalil
- In office 17 November 1977 – 15 December 1977
- Prime Minister: Mamdouh Salem
- Preceded by: Ismail Fahmi
- Succeeded by: Muhammad Ibrahim Kamel

Personal details
- Born: 14 November 1922 Cairo, Egypt
- Died: 16 February 2016 (aged 93) Cairo, Egypt
- Party: ASU (before 1978); NDP (1978–2011); Independent (from 2011)
- Spouse: Leia Maria Nadler (before 2016)
- Education: Cairo University; University of Paris; Sciences Po

Boutros Boutros-Ghali (Note: /ˈbuːtrɒs ˈɡɑːli/; Arabic: بطرس بطرس غالي, romanized: Buṭrus Buṭrus Ghālī; Coptic: Ⲡⲉⲧⲣⲟⲥ Ⲡⲉⲧⲣⲟⲥ-Ⲅⲁⲗⲓ) (14 November 1922 – 16 February 2016) was an Egyptian politician and diplomat who served as the sixth secretary-general of the United Nations from 1992 to 1996. Prior to his appointment as secretary-general, Boutros-Ghali was the acting minister of foreign affairs of Egypt between 1977 and 1979. He oversaw the United Nations over a period coinciding with several world crises, including the breakup of Yugoslavia and the Rwandan genocide.

Born to a Coptic Christian family in Cairo, Boutros-Ghali was an academic by training and taught international law and international relations at Cairo University from 1949 to 1979. His political career began during the presidency of Anwar Sadat, who appointed him acting foreign minister in 1977. In that capacity, he helped negotiate the Camp David Accords and the Egypt–Israel peace treaty between Sadat and Israeli Prime Minister Menachem Begin. He was acting foreign minister until early 1991, when he served as deputy foreign minister for a few months.

Boutros-Ghali was elected secretary-general by the United Nations General Assembly in 1991 and began his term in 1992, succeeding Javier Pérez de Cuéllar. His tenure was marked by controversy and crises, which included the Somali Civil War, the Rwandan Civil War, the continuing Angolan Civil War and the Yugoslav Wars. He received criticism over UN inaction in Angola and during the genocide in Rwanda, and the perceived ineffectiveness of the UN peacekeeping operation in Bosnia led to a NATO intervention. In 1996, Boutros-Ghali ran unopposed for a second term as secretary-general, but the United States, long dissatisfied with his leadership, denied his bid by exercising its Security Council veto.

After leaving the UN, Boutros-Ghali served as the first Secretary-General of La Francophonie from 1997 to 2002. He then became chairman of the South Centre, an intergovernmental think tank for developing countries. He died in 2016, in Cairo at the age of 93.

== Early life and education ==
Boutros Boutros-Ghali was born in Cairo, Egypt, on 14 November 1922 into a Coptic Orthodox Christian family. His father Yusuf Butros Ghali was the son of Boutros Ghali Bey then Pasha (also his namesake), who was Prime Minister of Egypt from 1908 until he was assassinated in 1910. His mother, Safeya (Sophie) Mikhail Sharubim, was daughter of Mikhail Sharubim (1861–1920), a prominent public servant and historian. The young boy was brought up by a Slovenian nanny, one of the so-called Aleksandrinke; he was closer to Milena, "his invaluable friend and confidant", than to his own mother.

Boutros-Ghali graduated from Cairo University in 1946. He received a PhD in international law from the Faculty of Law of Paris (University of Paris) and diploma in international relations from Sciences Po in 1949. During 1949–1979, he was appointed Professor of International Law and International Relations at Cairo University. He became President of the Centre of Political and Strategic Studies in 1975 and President of the African Society of Political Studies in 1980. He was a Fulbright Research Scholar at Columbia University from 1954 to 1955, Director of the Centre of Research at The Hague Academy of International Law from 1963 to 1964, and Visiting Professor at the Faculty of Law of Paris from 1967 to 1968. In 1986, he received an honorary doctorate from the Faculty of Law at Uppsala University, Sweden. He was also the Honorary Rector of the Graduate Institute of Peace Studies, a branch of Kyunghee University Seoul.

== Political career ==
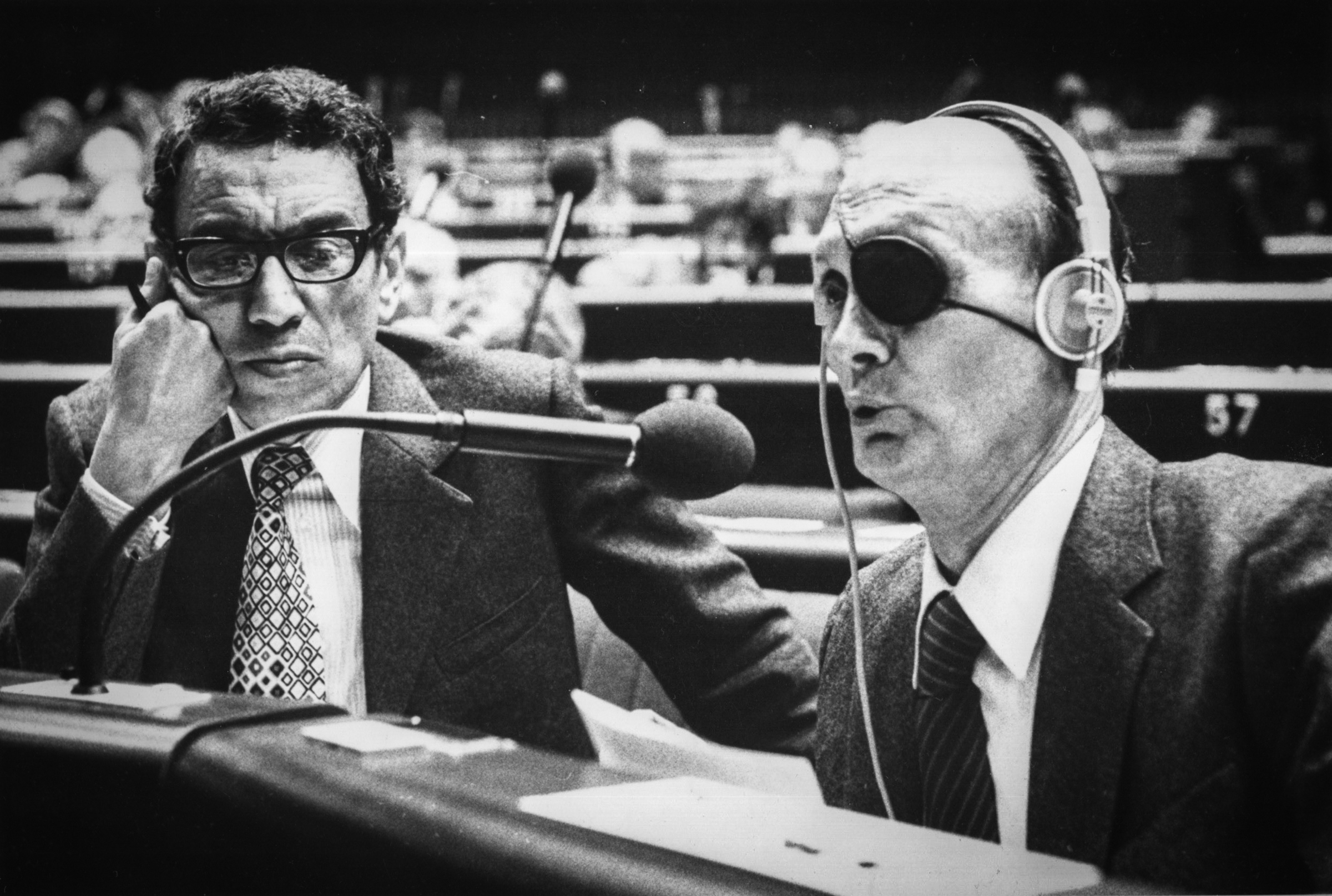
Boutros-Ghali (left) and Moshe Dayan at the Council of Europe in Strasbourg, 1979

Boutros-Ghali's political career developed during the presidency of Anwar Sadat. He was a member of the Central Committee of the Arab Socialist Union from 1974 to 1977. He served as Egypt's Minister of State for Foreign Affairs from 1977 until early 1991. He then became Deputy Minister for Foreign Affairs for several months before moving to the UN. As Minister of State, he played a part in the peace agreements between President Sadat and Israeli prime minister Menachem Begin.

According to investigative journalist Linda Melvern, Boutros-Ghali approved a secret $26 million arms sale to the government of Rwanda in 1990, when he was foreign minister, the weapons stockpiled by the Hutu regime as part of the fairly public, long-term preparations for the subsequent genocide. He was serving as UN secretary-general when the killings occurred four years later.

== United Nations Secretary-General ==
=== 1991 selection ===
Boutros-Ghali ran for Secretary-General of the United Nations in the 1991 selection. The top post in the UN was opening up as Javier Pérez de Cuéllar of Peru reached the end of his second term, and Africa was next in the rotation. Boutros-Ghali tied Bernard Chidzero of Zimbabwe in the first two rounds of polling, edged ahead by one vote in round 3, and fell behind by one vote in round 4. After several countries withdrew their support for Chidzero, fed by fears that the United States was trying to eliminate both of the leading candidates, Boutros-Ghali won a clear victory in round 5.

=== Tenure (1992–1996) ===
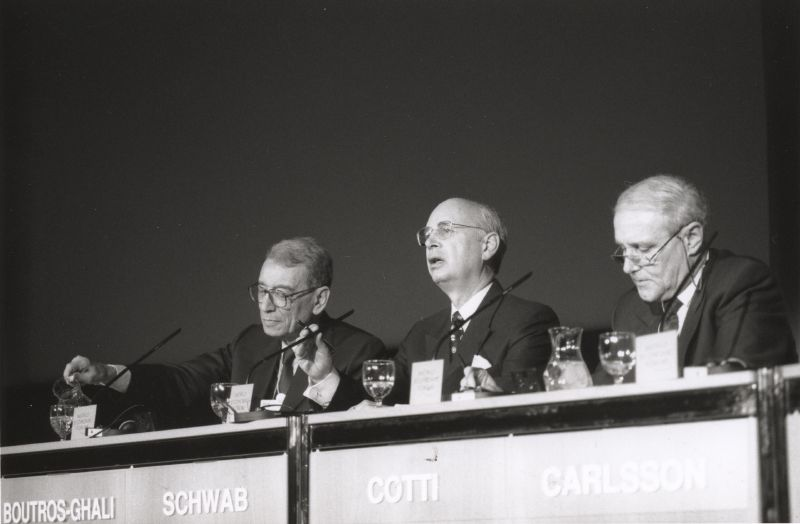
Boutros-Ghali, Klaus Schwab and Flavio Cotti at the World Economic Forum Annual Meeting in Davos, 1995

Boutros-Ghali's term in office remains controversial. In 1992, he submitted An Agenda for Peace, a suggestion for how the UN could respond to violent conflict. He set three goals: for the UN to be more active in promoting democracy, for the UN to conduct preventative diplomacy to avert crises, and to expand the UN's role as peacekeeper. Although the goals were consistent with those of US president George H. W. Bush, he nevertheless repeatedly clashed with the United States, especially with his efforts to enlist the support of the US, to involve UN more deeply in the civil wars in Somalia (1992) and in Rwanda (1994). The United States refused to send peace enforcement units under UN leadership. Malaysian Prime Minister Mahathir Mohamad called on Boutros-Ghali to resign for failing to take any firm action to help resolve the conflict in Bosnia-Herzegovina.

Boutros-Ghali was criticised for the UN's failure to act during the 1994 Rwandan genocide, during which over a half million people were killed. Boutros-Ghali also appeared unable to muster support in the UN for intervention in the continuing Angolan Civil War. One of the hardest tasks during his term was dealing with the crisis of the Yugoslav Wars after the disintegration of the former Yugoslavia. The UN peacekeeping force was ineffective in Bosnia and Herzegovina, leading to the intervention by NATO in December 1995. His reputation became entangled in the larger controversies over the effectiveness of the UN and the role of the United States in the UN.

The US journalist Mark Bowden argues that he was responsible for an escalation of the Somalia crisis by undertaking a personal vendetta against Mohamed Farrah Aidid and his Habar Gidir clan, favouring their rivals, the Darod, the clan of the former dictator Siad Barre. In Bowden's opinion, it was believed that he demanded the 12 July 1993 US helicopter attack on a meeting of Habar Gidir clan leaders, who were meeting to discuss a peace initiative put forward by the leader of the UN Mission in Mogadishu, retired US Admiral Jonathan Howe. Bowden further suggests that most of the clan elders were eager to arrange peace and rein in the subversive activities of their clan leader Aidid. Still, after this attack on a peaceful meeting, the clan was resolved to fight the Americans and the UN, leading to the Battle of Mogadishu on 3–4 October 1993.

=== United States blocks second term ===
Boutros-Ghali ran unopposed for the customary second term in 1996, despite efforts by the United States to unseat him. US ambassador Madeleine Albright denounced him as "disengaged" and "neglect[ful]" of genocide in Rwanda and demanded Boutros-Ghali resign. He refused and seemingly had the votes. He won 14 of the 15 votes in the Security Council, but the sole opposing vote was a US veto. After four deadlocked meetings of the Security Council, France offered a compromise in which Boutros-Ghali would be appointed to a short term of two years, but the United States rejected the French offer. Finally, Boutros-Ghali suspended his candidacy, becoming the only Secretary-General ever to be denied re-election by a veto.

== Later life ==
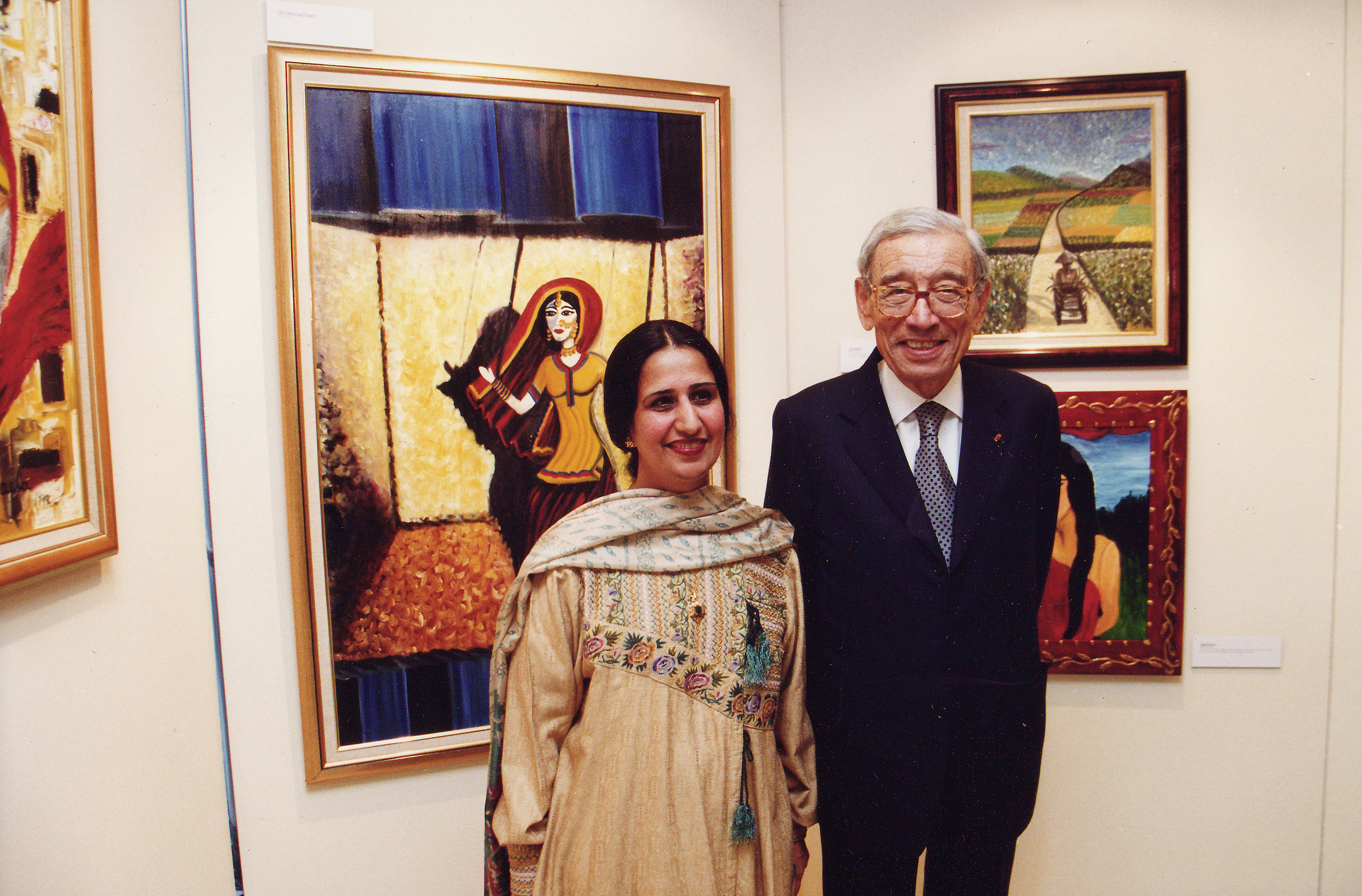
Boutros-Ghali with Naela Chohan at UNESCO in Paris, 2002

From 1997 to 2002, Boutros-Ghali was Secretary-General of La Francophonie, an organisation of French-speaking nations. From 2002 to 2005, he served as the chairman of the board of the South Centre, an intergovernmental research organisation of developing countries. Boutros-Ghali played a "significant role" in creating Egypt's National Council for Human Rights and served as its president until 2012.

Boutros-Ghali supported the Campaign for the Establishment of a United Nations Parliamentary Assembly and was one of the initial signatories of the Campaign's appeal in 2007. In a message to the Campaign, he stressed the necessity to establish democratic participation of citizens at the global level. From 2009 to 2015, he also participated as a jury member for the Conflict Prevention Prize, awarded every year by the Fondation Chirac.

== Death ==
Boutros-Ghali died aged 93 in a Cairo hospital after being admitted for a broken pelvis or leg on 16 February 2016. A military funeral was held for him with prayers led by Pope Tawadros II of Alexandria. He is buried at Petrine Church in Abbassia, Cairo.

== Personal life ==
Boutros-Ghali's wife, Leia Maria Nadler (1924–2024), was raised in an Egyptian Jewish family in Alexandria and converted to Catholicism as a young woman.

== Honorary degrees ==
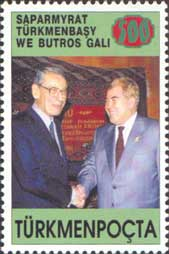
Boutros-Ghali in a stamp of Turkmenistan with Saparmurat Niyazov, 1996

He received honorary degrees from Sciences Po, Russian Academy of Sciences, Catholic University of Leuven, Université Laval, Université de Moncton, Carleton University, Université du Québec à Chicoutimi, Charles III University of Madrid, University of Bucharest, Baku State University, Yerevan State University, University of Haifa, University of Vienna, University of Melbourne, Seoul National University, Waseda University, University of Bordeaux, and Uppsala University.

== Awards and recognition ==
- The World Affairs Council Christian A. Herter memorial award, Boston (March 1993)
- The Arthur A. Houghton Jr. Star Crystal Award for Excellence de l'Institut afro- américain, New York (November 1993)
- Member of the Académie des Sciences Morales et Politiques
- Honorary membership of the Order of Canada
- Honorary membership of the Russian Academy of Natural Sciences, Moscow (April 1994)
- Honorary foreign membership of the Russian Academy of Sciences, Moscow (April 1994)
- Honorary foreign membership of the Academy of Sciences of Belarus, Minsk (April 1994)
- Fellow of Berkeley College, Yale University (March 1995)
- The recipient of the Onassis Award for International Understanding and Social Achievement (July 1995)

== Honours ==
=== National honors ===
Year	Ribbon	Honour
1991		Grand Collar of the Order of the Nile
1989		Grand Cordon of the Order of the Arab Republic of Egypt
1977		Grand Cross of the Order of Merit

=== Foreign honors ===
Country	Year	Ribbon	Honour
(Argentina)			Grand Cross of the Order of the Liberator General San Martín
(Belgium)			Grand Cordon of the Order of Leopold
(Brazil)			Grand Cross of the Order of the Southern Cross
(Canada)	2003		Companion of the Order of Canada
(Central African Republic)		CAR Ordre de la Reconnaissance Centrafricaine GC ribbon	Grand Cross of the Order of Central African recognition
(Chile)			Grand Cross of the Order of Merit (Chile)
(Colombia)			Grand Cross of the Order of Boyaca
(Denmark)			Knight of the Order of the Elephant
(Ecuador)			Grand Cross of the National Order of San Lorenzo
(El Salvador)			Grand Cross with Silver Star of the Order of José Matías Delgado
(France)	1994		Grand Cross of the Legion of Honour
(Germany)		GER Bundesverdienstkreuz 9 Sond des Grosskreuzes	Grand Cross of the Order of Merit of the Federal Republic of Germany
(Greece)			Grand Cross of the Order of the Redeemer
(Italy)	1982		Knight Grand Cross Order of Merit of the Italian Republic
(Ivory Coast)			Grand Cross of the Order of Ivory Merit
(Japan)			Grand Cordon of the Order of the Chrysanthemum
(Luxembourg)			Grand Cross of the Order of Merit of the Grand Duchy of Luxembourg
(Mali)			Grand Cross of the National Order of Mali
(Mexico)		MEX Order of the Aztec Eagle 1Class BAR	Grand Cross of the Order of the Aztec Eagle
(Nepal)			Grand Commander of the Order of the Star of Nepal
(Norway)	1994		Grand Cross of the Order of St. Olav
(Peru)			Grand Cross of the Order of the Sun of Peru
(Portugal)	1996		Grand Cross of the Order of Prince Henry
(Quebec)	2002		Grand Cross of the Order of La Pléiade
(Romania)	2001	ROU Order of the Star of Romania 1999 GCross BAR	Grand Cross of the Order of the Star of Romania
(Senegal)		SEN Order of the Lion – Grand Cross BAR	Grand Cross of the National Order of the Lion
(South Korea)			Grand Order of Mugunghwa
(Sovereign Military Order of Malta)		MaltaBali	Grand Cross of the Sovereign Military Order of Malta
(Sweden)			Grand Cross of the Order of the Polar Star
(Holy See)	1993		Knight of the Order of Pope Pius IX

== Published works ==
As Secretary-General, Boutros-Ghali wrote An Agenda for Peace. He also published other memoirs:

=== In English ===
- The Arab League, 1945–1955: Ten Years of Struggle, ed. Carnegie Endowment for International Peace, New York, 1954
- New Dimensions of Arms Regulations and Disarmament in the Post Cold War, ed. United Nations, New York, 1992
- An Agenda for Development, ed. United Nations, New York, 1995
- Confronting New Challenges, ed. United Nations, New York, 1995
- Fifty Years of the United Nations, ed. William Morrow, New York, 1995
- The 50th Anniversary: Annual Report on the Work of the Organization, ed. United Nations, New York, 1996
- An Agenda for Democratization, ed. United Nations, New York, 1997
- Egypt's Road to Jerusalem: A Diplomat's Story of the Struggle for Peace in the Middle East, ed. Random House, New York, 1998
- Essays on Leadership (with George H. W. Bush, Jimmy Carter, Mikhail Gorbachev, and Desmond Tutu), ed. Carnegie Commission on Preventing Deadly Conflict, Washington, 1998
- Unvanquished: A US-UN Saga, ed. I. B. Tauris, New York, 1999
- The Papers of United Nations Secretary (with Charles Hill), ed. Yale University Press, New York, 2003
- The Arab League, 1945–1955: International Conciliation, ed. Literary Licensing Publisher, London, 2013

=== In French ===
- Contribution à l'étude des ententes régionales, ed. Pedone, Paris, 1949
- Cours de Diplomatie et de Droit Diplomatique et consulaire, ed. Librairie Anglo-égyptienne, Cairo, 1951
- Le problème du canal de Suez, ed. Société égyptienne du droit international, Cairo, 1957
- Le principe d'égalité des États et des organisations internationales, ed. Académie de droit international, Leiden, 1961
- Contribution à une théorie générale des alliances, ed. Pedone, Paris, 1963
- Le Mouvement afro-asiatique, ed. Presses universitaires de France, Paris, 1969
- L'organisation de l'Unité africaine, ed. Armand Colin, Paris, 1969
- Les difficultés institutionnelles du panafricanisme, ed. Institut Universitaire des Hautes études Internationales, Geneva, 1971
- Les conflits des frontières en Afrique, ed. Techniques et Économiques, Paris, 1972
- Contribution à une théorie générale des alliances, ed. Pedone, Paris, 1991
- L'interaction démocratie et développement [eds.], ed. Unesco, Paris, 2002
- Démocratiser la mondialisation, ed. Rocher, Paris, 2002
- Émanciper la Francophonie, ed. L'Harmattan, Paris, 2003
- 60 Ans de conflit israélo-arabe : Témoignages pour l'Histoire (with Shimon Peres), ed. Complexes, Paris, 2006

== See also ==
- List of Copts

== Notes ==
Political offices
Preceded by Ismail Fahmi	Minister of Foreign Affairs; Acting; 1977	Succeeded by Muhammad Ibrahim Kamel
Preceded by Muhammad Ibrahim Kamel	Minister of Foreign Affairs; Acting; 1978–1979	Succeeded by Mustafa Khalil
Positions in intergovernmental organisations
Preceded by Javier Pérez de Cuéllar	Secretary-General of the United Nations; 1992–1996	Succeeded by Kofi Annan
Preceded by Jean-Louis Roy as Secretary-General of the Agence de Coopération Culturelle et Technique	Secretary-General of La Francophonie; 1997–2002	Succeeded by Abdou Diouf
