= 1977 visit by Anwar Sadat to Jerusalem =

1977 trip by the President of Egypt

Anwar Sadat's visit to Jerusalem
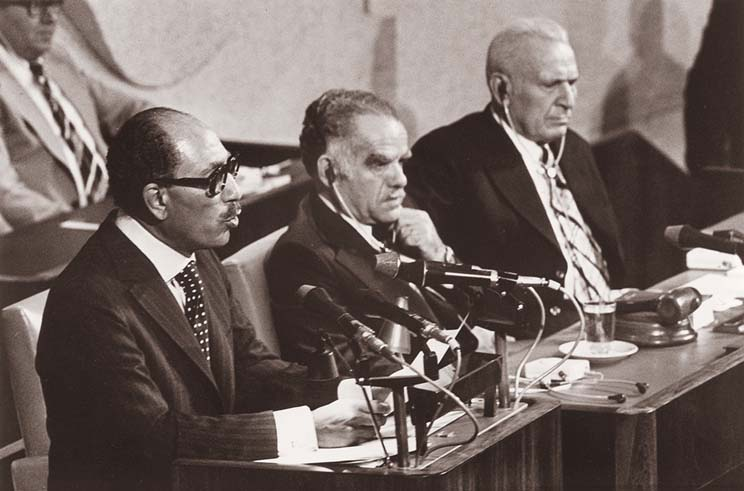
- Anwar Sadat addressing the Knesset
- Date: 19–21 November 1977
- Location: Jerusalem
- Motive: Ending the 'neither peace nor war' status quo that worsened the economic situation.; Maintaining the 1973 war's achievements by preventing a fifth war that would forfeit these gains.; Dismantling the barrier of direct communication and illustrating Egypt's serious intent for peace directly to the Israelis.
- Participants: Anwar Sadat; Boutros Boutros-Ghali; Hassan Tuhami

On 19–21 November 1977, Egyptian President Anwar Sadat visited Jerusalem. The purpose of the visit was to address the Knesset, the legislative body of Israel, to try to advance the Arab-Israeli peace process. Sadat met with senior Israeli officials, including Prime Minister Menachem Begin. It was the first visit of its kind by an Arab leader to Israeli-controlled territory. As of today, it remains the only such visit. At that time, the two countries were considered at war. The visit effectively marked Cairo's de facto recognition of the State of Israel. Sadat declared his wish for the October 1973 War to be 'the last war.' Sadat's initiative is deemed unique and significant, as it was unprecedented for an Arab leader to meet with a Zionist official since the meeting of Prince Faisal bin Al-Hussein with Chaim Weizmann, President of the Zionist Organization, in June 1918.

== Background ==
International Zionist leaders sent telegrams to the Egyptian embassies in Austria and Washington D.C. expressing their desire to hold a secret meeting with Sadat, but these attempts failed due to the objection of the foreign minister. The Israelis did not despair, so they went to Moroccan King Hassan II, where Menachem Begin suggested direct contact with Egypt, and Sadat accepted that. He sent Hassan Al-Tahami as his delegate to meet Moshe Dayan, the then minister of foreign affairs, in Rabat.

Sadat had stated before a special session of the Egyptian People's Assembly that he was ready to go to their "home," the Knesset in Jerusalem, and discuss peace on 9 November 1977. Among those present was the leader of the Palestine Liberation Organization, Yasser Arafat. Sadat got a standing ovation, and the audience did not think that the president was serious about what he was saying. The Israelis responded and sent an official invitation to him through the American ambassador in Cairo.

Foreign Minister Ismail Fahmi submitted his resignation in protest just two days ahead of the visit. Sadat then turned to Minister of State for Foreign Affairs Mohamed Riad to head the ministry, but he too stepped down within hours over his objections to the move.

== Visit ==
Ahead of his trip to Israel, Sadat traveled to Damascus to sound out Syria's position directly with Assad. Refusing to alter his plans, he insisted on going to Jerusalem, remarking, "I am going; I always mean what I say." He also stated, "I will tell the Israelis in their very center: if you want to live in this region, these are the facts." Just hours after Sadat departed Damascus, two bombs detonated outside the Egyptian embassy, with no casualties disclosed immediately. The Egyptians subsequently organized a flight on November 18 for citizens who felt their safety was at risk. Support for the initiative also existed, with Saudi Arabia believed to have provided behind-the-scenes backing. In tandem, Tunisian President Habib Bourguiba extended his endorsement by sending his wife to Cairo with a personal letter commending the gesture as an advancement toward a "just and honorable peace".

After taking off from Abu Suweir Air Base, the President's plane landed at Ben Gurion Airport at 8:03 p.m., carrying officials and reporters. President Ephraim Katzir and Prime Minister Menachem Begin received him at the airport, where both national anthems were played and cannons were fired in salute.

“You want to live with us in this part of the world,” Sadat declared. “In all sincerity, I tell you, we welcome you among us, with full security and safety.” During the speech, he also fervently rejected Israeli sovereignty over the Old City of Jerusalem. After visiting Al Aqsa Mosque, Sadat toured the Church of the Holy Sepulchre.

== Motives ==
Sadat justified his openness toward a diplomatic settlement and the potential establishment of bilateral relations through his deep conviction that the rules must be changed. In his view, protracted conventional wars subjected Egypt and the Arab nations to severe economic and human casualties without yielding a final solution for the restoration of occupied lands. On the economic and military fronts, he was aware of the structural challenges and internal crises exhausting Egypt, as well as the Western-supported Israeli technological and military supremacy that precluded a total military victory. Sadat maintained that Arab division and the lack of a clear, cohesive strategy among "confrontation states" undermined the collective bargaining stance, driving him to take unilateral action to retrieve Sinai and break the political stalemate.

== Aftermath ==
Sadat's move was widely condemned by Arab leaders. In response, Arab leaders, including the leaders of Libya, Algeria, Syria, South Yemen, Iraq, and the Palestine Liberation Organization, met in Tripoli, Libya, on 2 and 5 December 1977.

Talks continued in the Egyptian city of Ismailia, with American mediation. In 1978, the two sides would reach a bilateral agreement at Camp David that culminated in a peace treaty. On 6 October 1981, while watching the annual parade that marked Egypt's initial success in the Yom Kippur War, Sadat was assassinated. Some claim that one of the motives for the murder was the peace agreement.
