= Geneva Conference (1973) =

Arab–Israeli peace conference

The Geneva Conference of 1973 was an attempt to negotiate a solution to the Arab–Israeli conflict as envisioned in United Nations Security Council Resolution 338 following the called-for cease-fire to end the Yom Kippur War. After considerable "shuttle diplomacy" negotiations by Henry Kissinger, the conference opened on 21 December 1973 under the auspices of the United Nations Secretary General, with the United States and the USSR as co-chairmen. The foreign ministers of Egypt, Jordan and Israel were in attendance. The table with Syria's nameplate remained unoccupied, although Syria had indicated possible future participation. Each foreign minister spoke, mainly directed to their domestic audiences rather than to each other. Kissinger articulated his step-by-step strategy and stated that the goal of the conference was peace; the immediate need was to strengthen the cease-fire by accomplishing a disengagement of forces as the "essential first step" toward implementation of UN 242. The meeting was then adjourned.

Although no agreement was reached at Geneva, the effort was not in vain. Following the Israeli election, a military disengagement between Israel and Egypt was signed on 18 January 1974, and a disengagement between Israel and Syria was signed on 31 May.

Although attempts in later years to revive the Conference failed, the Sinai Interim Agreement between Israel and Egypt was formally signed in Geneva on 4 September 1975, as part of the Geneva Conference process. This agreement stated that the conflicts between Egypt and Israel "shall not be resolved by military force but by peaceful means."

== Egypt's goals ==
By the time of the accession of Anwar Sadat as president (15 October 1970), Egypt was disassociating itself from Arab nationalism and from radical regimes in the region. Egypt discouraged the participation of those nations in the Geneva Conference. The Egyptians' primary goal was to win back the territory they lost in 1967 to Israel in the Six-Day War under president Gamal Abdel Nasser. This was their goal during the Yom Kippur War just prior to the conference and the goal during the Camp David Accords in 1978.

== Palestinian representation issue ==
The Egyptians, Americans, Jordanians, and the Soviets hoped that, through the conference, some sort of international agreement on the Palestinian problem and on which specific persons would represent Palestinians in international affairs would be developed. Egypt was in favor of the Palestine Liberation Organization (PLO) to represent the Palestinians and to join Egypt, Israel, the United States, and other established nations in the Geneva Conference. Syrian officials went one step further and insisted that if the PLO was not present at the Geneva Conference, Syria would not be present either. Israel and the United States opposed formal recognition of the PLO at the Geneva Conference because the PLO Charter did not recognize Israel's right to exist. Thus, no representatives from Syria were present at the conference either.

== US–Soviet relations ==
The Geneva Conference was the last time that the US accepted the Soviet Union as a co-equal partner in Middle East peace efforts. Later, the marked shift in the allegiance of Egypt – a decades-long Soviet ally which abruptly moved into the American orbit – enabled the US to shut out the Soviets and assert a role as the sole mediator between Israelis and Arabs, manifested first in Israeli–Egyptian relations and later also in Israeli–Palestinian relations.

== See also ==
- History of the Arab–Israeli conflict
- Israeli–Palestinian peace process
- Sinai Interim Agreement
