= Ismail Fahmy =

Egyptian diplomat and politician (1922–1997)

- اسماعيل فهمى
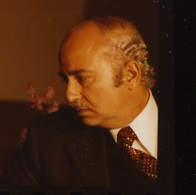

Personal details
- Born: 2 October 1922 Cairo, Kingdom of Egypt
- Died: 21 November 1997 (aged 75) Cairo, Egypt
- Party: Arab Socialist Union (until 1977); New Wafd Party (from 1984)
- Spouse: Afaf Hamed Mahmoud
- Children: 3, including Nabil Fahmy
- Education: Cairo University
- Profession: Diplomat

Ismail Fahmy (Egyptian Arabic: اسماعيل فهمى) (2 October 1922 – 21 November 1997) was an Egyptian diplomat and politician. He served as ambassador to Austria (1968–1971), Tourism Minister (1973), Foreign Minister (1973–1977) and Deputy Prime Minister (1975–1977). He was awarded a professorship. He resigned from the government in 1977 to protest President Anwar Sadat's visit to Jerusalem in Israel. Although initially a supporter and confidant of Sadat, he later became sharply critical of his policies and decision making.

== Early life and education ==
Fahmy was born on 2 October 1922. The son of a public prosecutor in Cairo, he earned a degree in political science from Cairo University in 1945.

== Early career ==
Fahmy joined the Ministry of Foreign Affairs in 1946. He served as a diplomat, being part of Egypt's delegation to the United Nations from 1949 to 1957. He was an activist and a tough negotiator. Fahmy then served in Egypt's delegation to the International Atomic Energy Agency until 1959.

He returned to Egypt and worked at the foreign office. He was appointed ambassador to Austria in 1968. From 1969 to 1970 he served as the ambassador of Egypt to France. His next post was Deputy Foreign Minister which he held from 1971 to November 1973.

Fahmy came to the attention of Sadat at a symposium in Egypt. His arguments in relation to Egyptian military action against Israel, the re-evaluation and reshaping of Egyptian-Soviet relations, closer contact with the United States and the involvement with both Moscow and Washington in solving the Middle East conflict impressed Sadat, who appointed Fahmy as foreign minister following the Yom Kippur War.

== Foreign Minister of Egypt, 1973–1977 ==
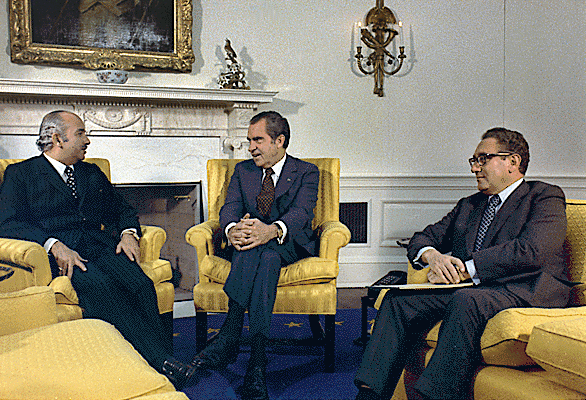
On 31 October 1973, Ismail Fahmy met with Richard Nixon and Henry Kissinger, about a week after the end of the Yom Kippur War.

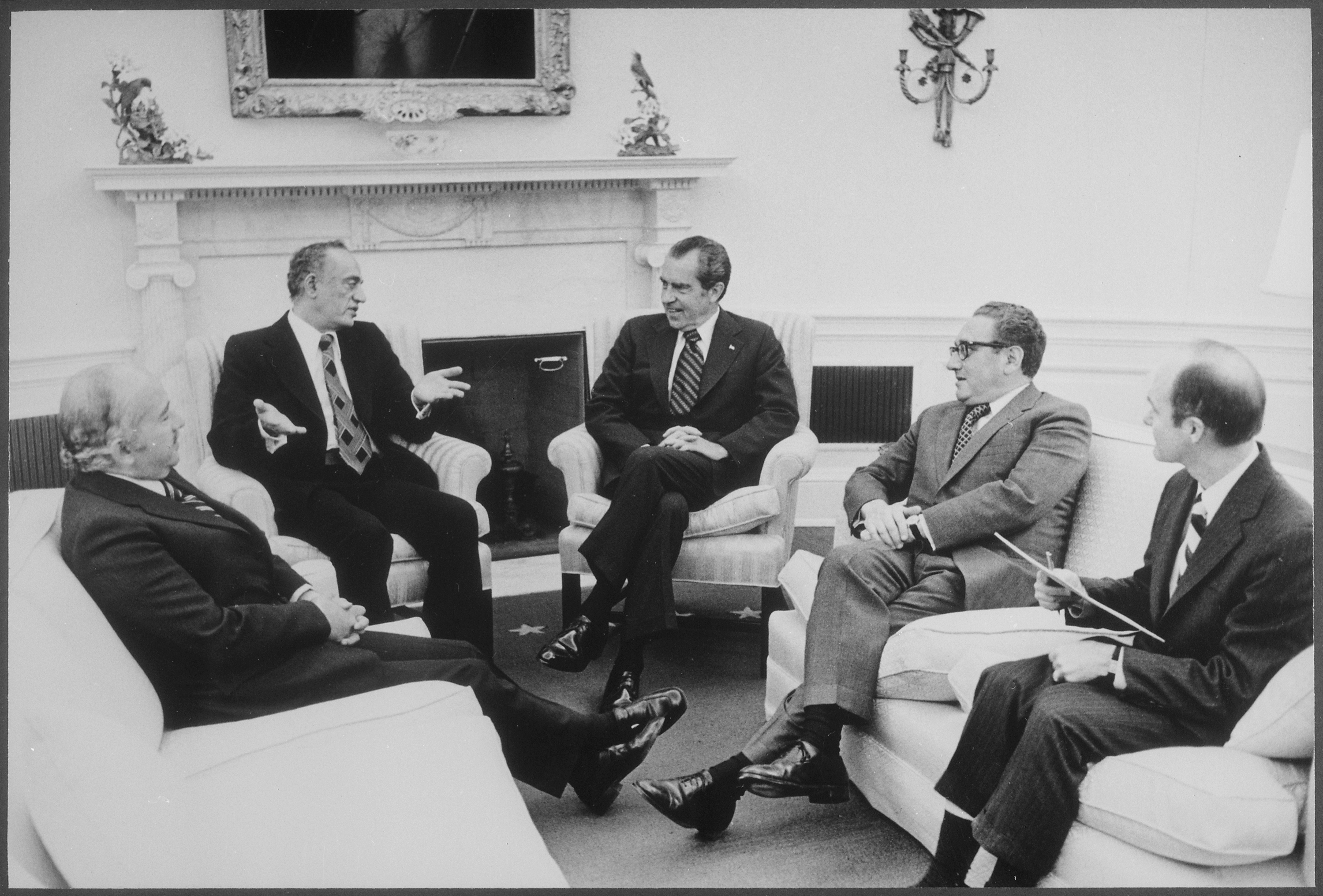
From the left: Fahmi, Omar Al Saqqaf, Richard Nixon, Henry Kissinger, and Brent Scowcroft on 19 February 1974

Fahmy served as foreign minister from 31 October 1973 to 17 November 1977. He decided to keep lines of communication open between Egypt and the Soviet Union. However, Fahmy recounts certain events in which he was directly involved: his first encounters with Henry Kissinger and Richard Nixon; his participation in talks leading to the Egyptian-Israeli disengagement agreement of 1974 and the Sinai Interim Agreement of 1975. He reluctantly supported the first agreement and was opposed to the second. He met with both US and Soviet foreign ministers. According to Fahmy, “Kissinger is highly intelligent but he has a tendency to manipulate people”. On Zbigniew Brzezinski, Fahmy stated that he was "a professor at heart inclined to lecture an experienced diplomat”. When Sadat decided to visit Jerusalem, the proclaimed capital of Israel, he reacted to the decision by saying "I believed it would harm Egypt’s national security, damage our relations with the other Arab countries, and destroy our leadership of the Arab world."

Furthermore, he argued that Sadat could not provide any proof that the Israelis would respond to his move with comparable good will. After Sadat's visit, he resigned from his post and was replaced by Mohamed Ibrahim Kamel.

== Later career ==
Following his resignation, Fahmy continued to support the convocation of the Geneva Conference of 1973 as the only way to achieve peace. He continued to write books and articles about peacemaking activities in the Middle East. His most well-known book was Negotiating for Peace in the Middle East: An Arab View. For many years, he worked as an academic in Egypt. In 1984, he unsuccessfully ran for office in the general elections as a candidate of the New Wafd Party.

== Personal life and death ==
Fahmy died on 21 November 1997 at the age of 75. He and his wife Afaf Hamed Mahmoud had three children. One of his sons, Nabil, was appointed Foreign Minister of the interim government of Egypt led by Hazem al-Beblawi in July 2013.

Political offices
Preceded by Mohammed Hassan El-Zayyat	Foreign Minister of Egypt; 1973-1977	Succeeded by Muhammad Ibrahim Kamel
