= Muhammad Ibrahim Kamel =

Egyptian diplomat and politician (1927–2001)

Minister of Foreign Affairs
- In office 24 December 1977 – 16 September 1978
- Preceded by: Ismail Fahmi
- Succeeded by: Mustafa Khalil

Personal details
- Born: 6 January 1927
- Died: 22 November 2001 (aged 74)

Muhammad Ibrahim Kamel (6 January 1927 – 22 November 2001) was an Egyptian diplomat and politician.

== Biography ==
Kamel was born on 6 January 1927. He studied law at Cairo University and graduated in 1947. He and Anwar Sadat, later President of Egypt, were both jailed due to their alleged role in the assassination of Amin Osman, former finance minister, in January 1946. Kamel entered the Egyptian diplomatic service in 1956 and served as ambassador to Zaire, Sweden and West Germany.

Kamel succeeded Ismail Fahmi as the minister of foreign affairs in December 1977 when Fahmi resigned from the office. He was appointed to the post on 24 December 1977 and served as foreign minister until 16 September 1978 when he also resigned from the office. As foreign minister, he took part in the Camp David Accords, but resigned without signing the treaty.

Kamel was married and had two sons. He died on 22 November 2001 at the age of 74.

=== Works ===
Kamel published a book entitled The Lost Peace of The Camp David Accords in 1984.

Political offices
Preceded by Ismail Fahmi	Foreign Minister of Egypt; 1977-1978	Succeeded by Mustafa Khalil
