= Nabil Fahmy =

Egyptian diplomat and politician (born 1951)

- نبيل فهمي
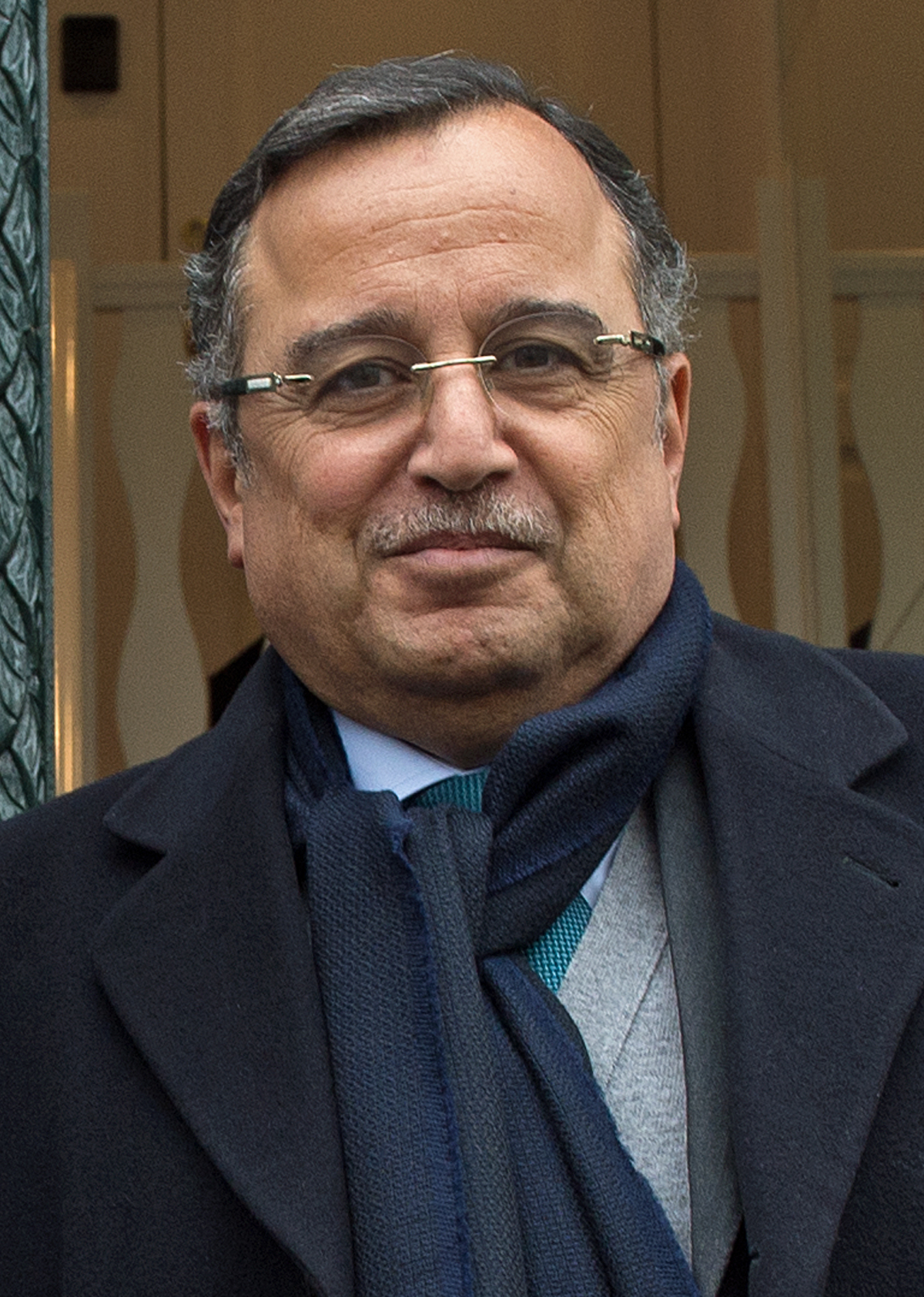
- Fahmy in 2014

9th Secretary-General of the Arab League
- Incumbent
- Assumed office 1 July 2026
- Deputy: TBD
- Preceded by: Ahmed Aboul Gheit

Minister of Foreign Affairs
- In office 16 July 2013 – 17 June 2014
- Prime Minister: Hazem Al Beblawi; Ibrahim Mahlab
- Preceded by: Mohamed Kamel Amr
- Succeeded by: Sameh Shoukry

Personal details
- Born: 5 January 1951 (age 75) New York City, New York, US
- Party: Independent
- Other political affiliations: Constitution Party (until July 2013)
- Spouse: Nermin Fahmy
- Children: 3
- Parent: Ismail Fahmy (father)
- Education: American University in Cairo
- Profession: Diplomat, Academic

Nabil Fahmy (Arabic: نبيل فهمي; born 5 January 1951) is an Egyptian diplomat and politician who has served as the Secretary-General of the Arab League since July 2026. He also served as the minister of foreign affairs of Egypt from June 2013 to July 2014.

== Early life and education ==
Nabil Fahmy was born in New York on 5 January 1951. His father, Ismail Fahmy, was Anwar Sadat's foreign minister from 1973 to 1977.

He holds a Bachelor of Science degree in physics and mathematics and a master's degree in management, both of which he received from the American University in Cairo in 1974 and 1976, respectively.

== Career ==
Fahmy is a career diplomat. He served in the Egyptian cabinet from 1974 to 1978 in various posts, including deputy foreign minister. He also assumed the post of advisor to the Vice President of Egypt and was the secretary of the president for external communications from February 1974 to August 1976. He worked at the Ministry of Foreign Affairs in different capacities, including member of the Egyptian mission to the United Nations Office at Geneva and New York and political advisor from August 1993 to September 1997. He served as the Ambassador of Egypt to Japan from September 1997 to September 1999. Next he served as the Ambassador of Egypt to the United States from October 1999 to September 2008.

From 1999 to 2003 he was also among the members of the UN Secretary General's advisory board on disarmament issues and he was appointed chairman of the board in 2001. Upon returning to Cairo he was named Ambassador-at-Large at the ministry.

After leaving his diplomatic post, he entered politics. He was a member of the Constitution Party headed by Mohamed ElBaradei. He also joined The American University in Cairo as a faculty member. He is also the founding dean of university's school of public affairs. In addition, he worked as the dean at the faculty. He was named non-resident chair of the Middle East project carried out by the James Martin center for nonproliferation studies in 2009. He was also a board member of McLarty associates.

On 14 July 2013, he announced that he had accepted a proposal to become minister of foreign affairs in the interim government of Egypt led by Hazem Al Beblawi. He accepted the post after Mohamed Kamel Amr had declared his intention not to continue in the post. On 16 July Fahmy's term as foreign minister began. Fahmy suspended his membership at the Constitution Party when he began to serve as foreign minister.

In March 2026, Fahmy was nominated as the secretary-general of the Arab League, succeeding Ahmed Aboul Gheit on 1 July 2026.

== Personal life ==
Fahmy is married to Nermin Fahmy and has three children. He publishes various articles in his blog at The Huffington Post. He is the author of Egypt’s Diplomacy in War, Peace and Transition which was published by Palgrave Macmillan in 2020.

He was given an honorary PhD by the Monterey Institute of International Studies, Middlebury College, in May 2009.
