= Hassan Tuhami =

Egyptian politician (1924–2009)

Hassan Tuhami (1924–2009) was an Egyptian deputy prime minister during Anwar Sadat's presidency. He also held various posts during the presidency of Gamal Abdel Nasser, including ambassador of Egypt to Austria and director general of the Arab Socialist Union.

== Biography ==
Tuhami was born in 1924. In 1961 he was named as the ambassador of Egypt to Austria. After serving in the post for one year he was given other posts such as chief observer of the International Atomic Energy Agency. In 1969 he was appointed secretary general of the Egyptian cabinet and director general of the ruling party Arab Socialist Union. In 1971 he became minister of state. Between 1974 and 1975 he served as secretary general of the Organisation of Islamic Cooperation.

In 1977, Tuhami met with Yitzhak Hofi, chief of Israel's Mossad, in Morocco. This was followed, on 16 September, by a meeting between Tuhami and Israeli foreign minister Moshe Dayan to discuss if Israel was sincere in pursuing peace talks with Egypt. This first Tuhami–Dayan meeting, facilitated by King Hassan II of Morocco, preceded Anwar Sadat's November 1977 trip to Jerusalem. It was in these meetings where the Egyptians first learned of Israel's willingness to withdraw "from Sinai in return for full, contractual, bilateral peace between the two states." Dayan, however, indicated in his book Breakthrough that he did not make such a promise and "was pleased that Sadat...would be coming to Jerusalem unaccompanied by any preconditions."

Tuhami and Dayan met again on 2 December 1977, in Morocco. Tuhami's meetings with Dayan were part of the process that led to the Camp David Accords (1978) and Egyptian–Israeli Peace Treaty (1979).

== See also ==
- War of Attrition
- List of modern conflicts in the Middle East
