= Shuttle diplomacy =

Acting as an intermediary and contact link between states in dispute

In diplomacy and international relations, shuttle diplomacy is the action of an outside party in serving as an intermediary between (or among) principals in a dispute, without direct principal-to-principal contact. Originally and usually, the process entails successive travel ("shuttling") by the intermediary, from the working location of one principal, to that of another.

The term was first applied to describe the efforts of United States Secretary of State Henry Kissinger, beginning November 5, 1973, which facilitated the cessation of hostilities following the Yom Kippur War.

Negotiators often use shuttle diplomacy when one or both of two principals refuses recognition of the other prior to mutually desired negotiation.

Mediators have adopted the term "shuttle diplomacy" as well.

== Examples ==
An early form of shuttle diplomacy emerged at the Paris Peace Conference in 1919 when Italy briefly withdrew from the Conference in protest of the other international delegations' refusal to grant its irredentist territorial claims promised by the Treaty of London in 1915. Upon Italy's return, Colonel Edward House of the U.S. delegation attempted to solve its conflict with the Kingdom of Serbs, Croats, and Slovenes by placing the two countries' delegates in separate rooms and attempting to broker a compromise between the two. House's efforts were ultimately unsuccessful, leading to the collapse of Italian Prime Minister Vittorio Orlando's government in Rome and Gabriele D'Annunzio's takeover of Fiume.

Kissinger continued to participate in shuttle diplomacy in the Middle East during the Nixon and Ford administrations (1969–1977); it resulted in the Sinai Interim Agreement (1975) and arrangements between Israel and Syria on the Golan Heights (1974). The term became widespread during Kissinger's service as Secretary of State.

Soon after Kissinger's efforts, shuttle diplomacy came to the United States in the form of Israel and Egypt conducting negotiations at Camp David. The negotiations were successfully facilitated by President Jimmy Carter.

Turkey has carried out shuttle diplomacy, often involving Israel: Turkey was Israel's closest ally in the Muslim world, and some Arab countries (notably Syria, which has common borders with both Turkey and Israel) have been amenable to Turkey, with its own Muslim majority population. Another Turkish mediation took place between Russia and Georgia during their war in 2008.

US Secretary of State Alexander Haig attempted to use shuttle diplomacy to mediate between the United Kingdom and Argentina during the Falklands War in 1982.

French president Emmanuel Macron's shuttle diplomacy was unsuccessful in preventing the 2022 Russian invasion of Ukraine.

== Proximity talks ==
Proximity talks are a diplomatic approach in which a neutral intermediary communicates between two opposing sides that agree to participate in the same conference but refuse direct contact. It is a kind of shuttle diplomacy with the mediator going between rooms.

== See also ==
- Track II diplomacy
