= Camp David Accords =

1978 political agreement between Egypt and Israel

Framework for Peace in the Middle East and Framework for the Conclusion of a Peace Treaty Between Egypt and Israel
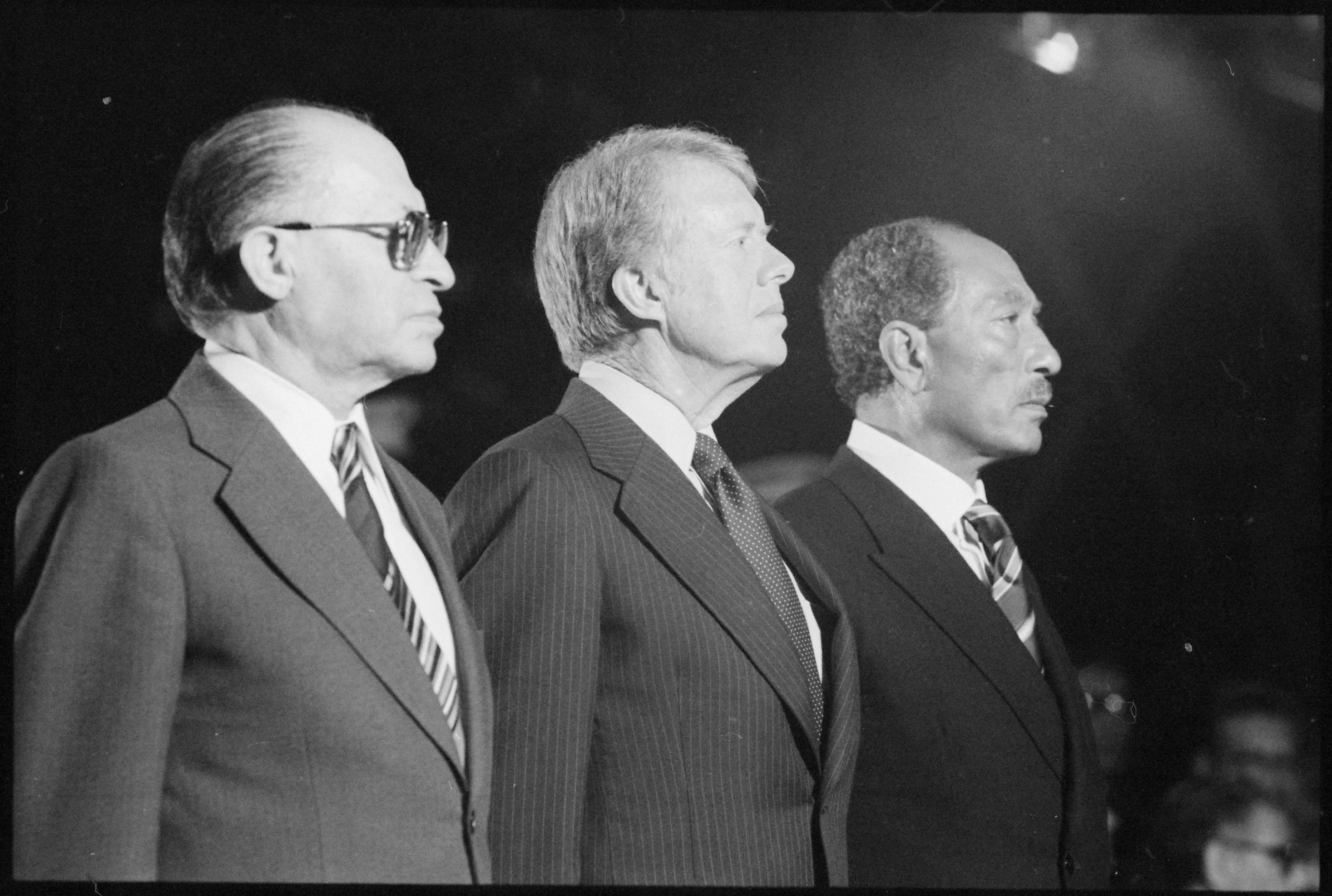
- Celebrating the signing of the Camp David Accords: Menachem Begin, Jimmy Carter, Anwar Sadat
- Type: Bilateral treaty
- Signed: 17 September 1978; 48 years ago
- Location: Washington, D.C., United States
- Signatories: Menachem Begin; Anwar Sadat; Jimmy Carter
- Parties: Egypt; Israel
- Ratifiers: Egypt; Israel
- Language: English; French

The Camp David Accords were a pair of political agreements signed by Egyptian president Anwar Sadat and Israeli prime minister Menachem Begin on 17 September 1978, following twelve days of secret negotiations at Camp David, the country retreat of the president of the United States in Maryland. The two framework agreements were signed at the White House and were witnessed by President Jimmy Carter. The second of these frameworks (A Framework for the Conclusion of a Peace Treaty Between Egypt and Israel) led directly to the 1979 Egypt–Israel peace treaty. Due to the agreement, Sadat and Begin received the shared 1978 Nobel Peace Prize. The first framework (A Framework for Peace in the Middle East), which dealt with the Palestinian territories, was written without participation of any Palestinians and was condemned by the United Nations.

The agreement sparked broad discontent throughout much of the Arab world, as it was perceived as a unilateral peace initiative that neglected the establishment of a Palestinian state, ultimately seen as weakening the cohesion of the Arab position.

== Preceding diplomacy ==
=== Carter Initiative ===
Carter's and Secretary of State Cyrus Vance's exploratory meetings gave a basic plan for reinvigorating the peace process based on a Geneva Peace Conference and had presented three main objectives for Arab–Israeli peace: Arab recognition of Israel's right to exist in peace, Israel's withdrawal from occupied territories gained in the Six-Day War through negotiating efforts with neighboring Arab nations to ensure that Israel's security would not be threatened, and securing an undivided Jerusalem.

The Camp David Accords were the result of 14 months of diplomatic efforts by Egypt, Israel, and the United States that began after Jimmy Carter became president. The efforts initially focused on a comprehensive resolution of disputes between Israel and the Arab countries, gradually evolving into a search for a bilateral agreement between Israel and Egypt.

Upon assuming office on 20 January 1977, President Carter moved to rejuvenate the Middle East peace process that had stalled throughout the 1976 presidential campaign in the United States. Following the advice of a Brookings Institution report, Carter opted to replace the incremental, bilateral peace talks which had characterized Henry Kissinger's shuttle diplomacy following the 1973 Yom Kippur War with a comprehensive, multilateral approach. The Yom Kippur War further complicated efforts to achieve the objectives written in United Nations Security Council Resolution 242.

Israel's prime minister Yitzhak Rabin and his successor, Menachem Begin, were both skeptical of an international conference. While Begin, who took office in May 1977, officially favored the reconvening of the conference, perhaps even more vocally than Rabin, and even accepted the Palestinian presence, in actuality the Israelis and the Egyptians were secretly formulating a framework for bilateral talks. Even earlier, Begin had not been opposed to returning the Sinai, but a major future obstacle was his firm refusal to consider relinquishing control over the West Bank.

=== Participating parties ===
Territory held by Israel: before the Six-Day War after the war

Carter visited the heads of government on whom he would have to rely to make any peace agreement feasible. By the end of his first year (1977) in office, Carter had met with Anwar El Sadat of Egypt, Hussein of Jordan, Hafez al-Assad of Syria, and Yitzhak Rabin of Israel. The new Israeli prime minister Menachem Begin however, taking over the office from Yitzhak Rabin in June 1977, specifically demanded that the PLO would be excluded from peace talks. Despite the fact that Jordan’s King Hussein supported Sadat's peace initiative, Hussein refused to take part in the peace talks; Menachem Begin offered Jordan little to gain and Hussein also feared he would isolate Jordan from the Arab world and provoke Syria and the PLO if he engaged in the peace talks as well. Hafez al-Assad, who had no interest in negotiating peace with Israel, also refused to come to the United States.

=== Sadat Initiative ===
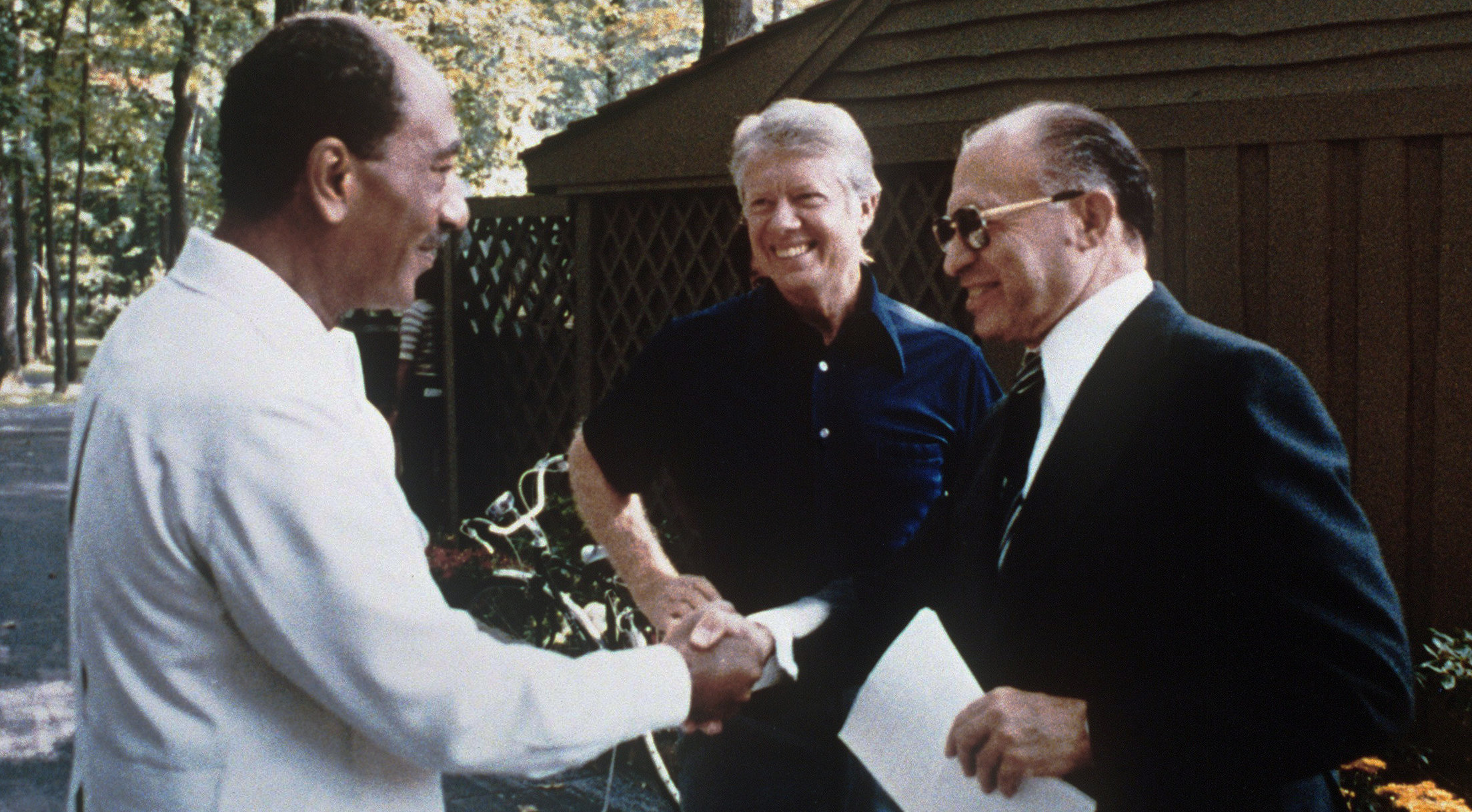
Anwar Sadat, Jimmy Carter and Menachem Begin (left to right), at Camp David, September 1978

Sadat first spoke about the possibility of peace with Israel in February 1971; Egypt was the initiator of many moves in the 1970s. On 9 November 1977, he startled the world by announcing his intention to go to Jerusalem and speak before the Knesset. Shortly afterward, the Israeli government cordially invited him to address the Knesset in a message passed to Sadat via the US ambassador to Egypt. Ten days after his speech, Sadat arrived for the groundbreaking three-day visit, which launched the first peace process between Israel and an Arab state. As would be the case with later Israeli–Arab peace initiatives, Washington was taken by surprise; the White House and State Department were particularly concerned that Sadat was merely reaching out to reacquire Sinai as quickly as possible, putting aside the Palestinian problem. Considered as a man with strong political convictions who kept his eye on the main objective, Sadat had no ideological base, which made him politically inconsistent. The Sadat visit came about after he delivered a speech in Egypt stating that he would travel anywhere, "even Jerusalem," to discuss peace. That speech led the Begin government to declare that, if Israel thought that Sadat would accept an invitation, Israel would invite him. In Sadat's Knesset speech he talked about his views on peace, the status of Israel's occupied territories, and the Palestinian refugee problem. This tactic went against the intentions of both the West and the East, which were to revive the Geneva Conference.

The gesture stemmed from an eagerness to enlist the help of the NATO countries in improving the ailing Egyptian economy, a belief that Egypt should begin to focus more on its own interests than on the interests of the Arab world, and a hope that an agreement with Israel would catalyze similar agreements between Israel and her other Arab neighbors and help solve the Palestinian problem. Prime Minister Begin's response to Sadat's initiative, though not what Sadat or Carter had hoped, demonstrated a willingness to engage the Egyptian leader. Like Sadat, Begin also saw many reasons why bilateral talks would be in his country's best interests. It would afford Israel the opportunity to negotiate only with Egypt instead of with a larger Arab delegation that might try to use its size to make unwelcome or unacceptable demands. Israel felt Egypt could help protect Israel from other Arabs and Eastern communists. In addition, the commencement of direct negotiations between leaders – summit diplomacy – would distinguish Egypt from her Arab neighbors. Carter's people apparently had no inkling of the secret talks in Morocco between Dayan and Sadat's representative, Hassan Tuhami, that paved the way for Sadat's initiative. Indeed, in a sense Egypt and Israel were ganging up to push Carter off his Geneva track. The basic message of Sadat's speech at the Knesset were the request for the implementation of Resolutions 242 and 338. Sadat's visit was the first step to negotiations such as the preliminary Cairo Conference in December 1977.

=== Searching a negotiation modus ===
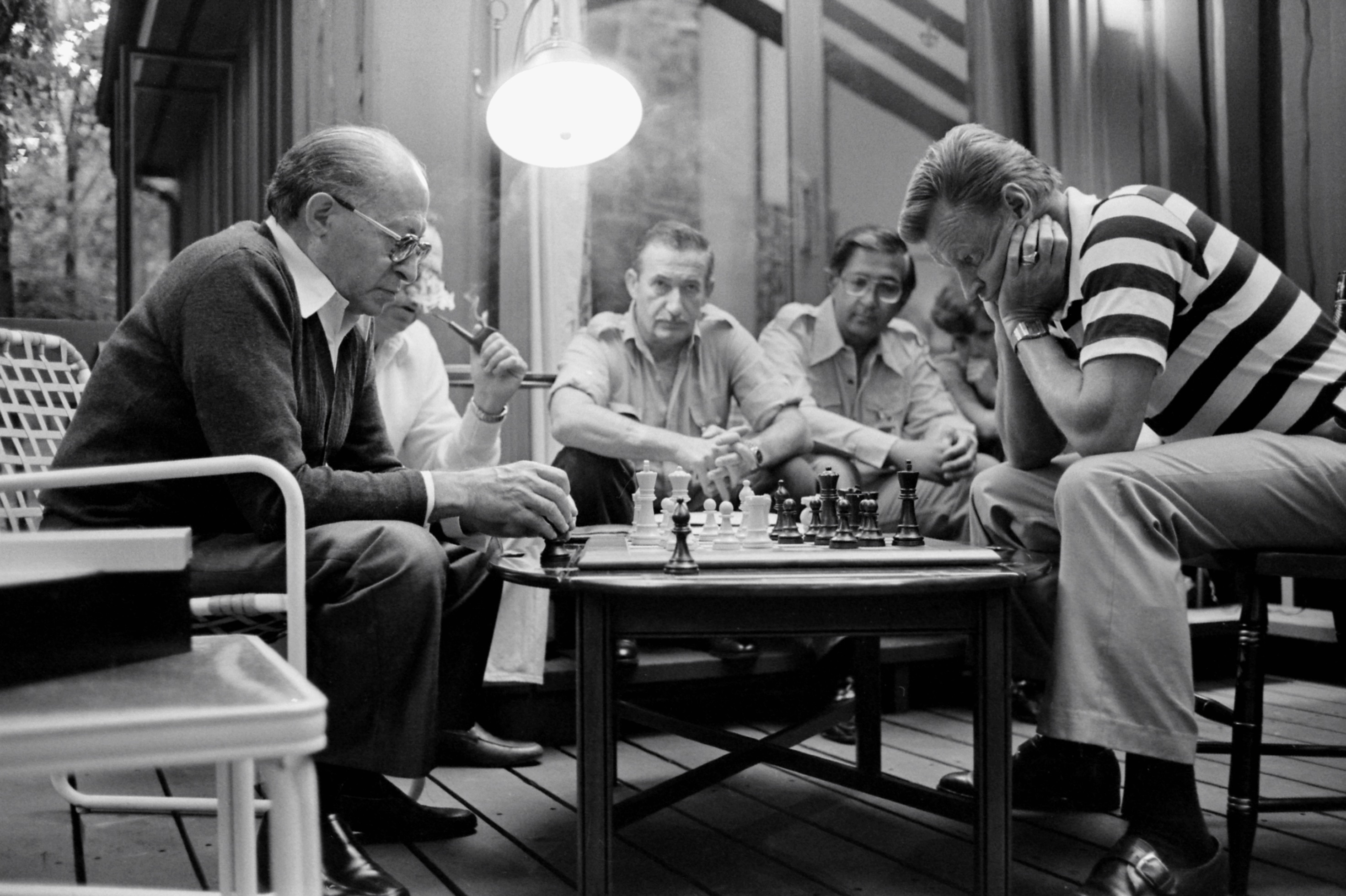
Begin and Brzezinski playing chess at Camp David

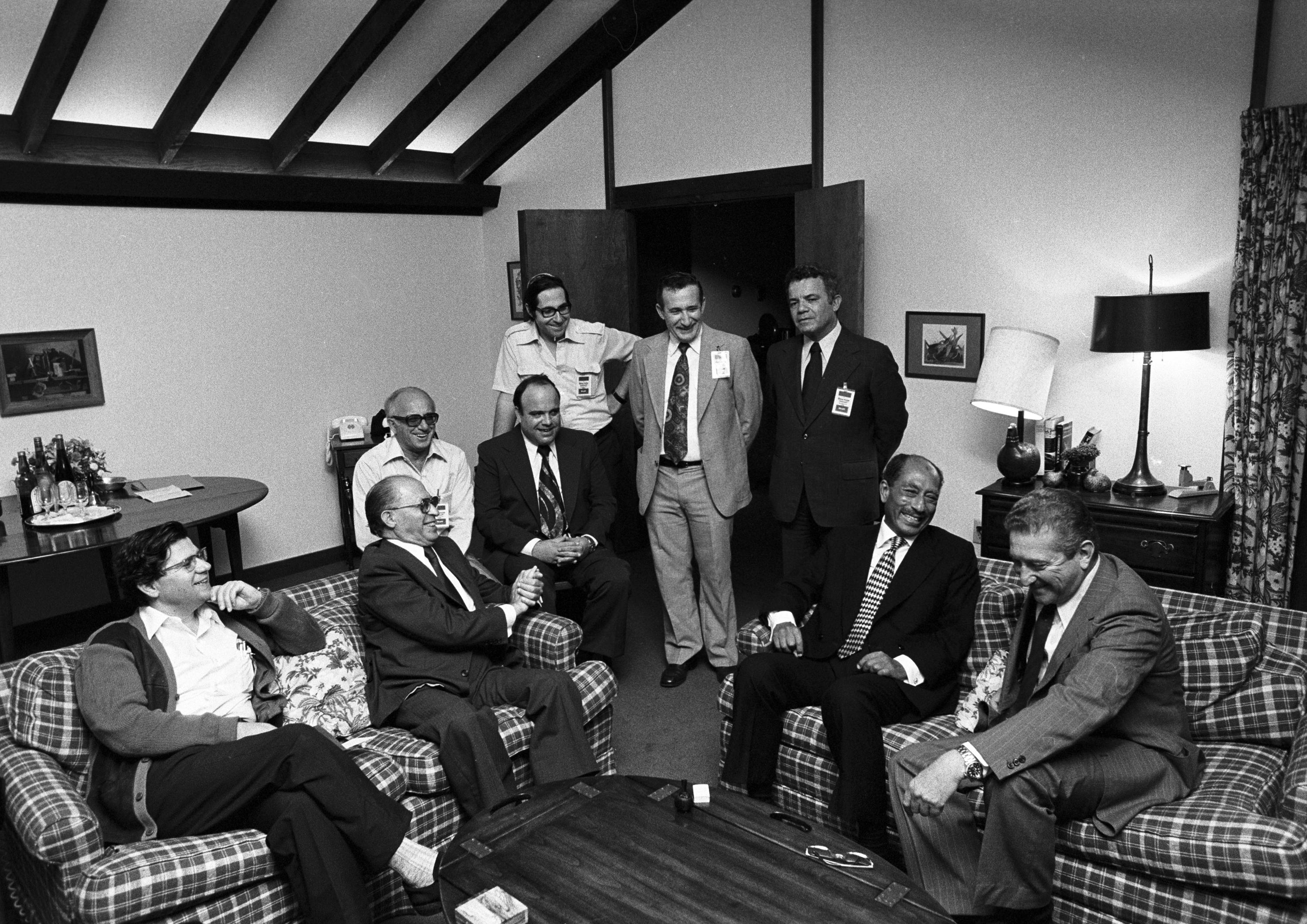
A 1978 meeting at Camp David with (seated, l-r) Aharon Barak, Menachem Begin, Anwar Sadat, and Ezer Weizman.

A mechanism had yet to be created for Israel and Egypt to pursue the talks begun by Sadat and Begin in Jerusalem. The Egyptian president suggested to Begin that Israel place a secret representative in the American embassy in Cairo. With American "cover," the true identity of the Israeli, who would liaise between the Egyptian and Israeli leaders, would be known only to the American ambassador in Cairo.

Carter's acceptance of the proposed liaison scheme would have signaled American backing for Sadat's unprecedented peace initiative, but Carter rejected the proposal. However, Carter could not thwart the Israeli–Egyptian peace push. Within days Israeli journalists were allowed into Cairo, breaking a symbolic barrier, and from there the peace process quickly gained momentum. An Israeli–Egyptian working summit was scheduled for 25 December in Ismailiya, near the Suez Canal.

== Proceedings of the Camp David meeting ==
Accompanied by their capable negotiating teams and with their respective interests in mind, the Israeli and Egyptian leaders Menachem Begin and Anwar Sadat converged on Camp David for 13 days of tense and dramatic negotiations from 5 to 17 September 1978.

Carter's advisers insisted on the establishment of an Egyptian–Israeli agreement which would lead to an eventual solution to the Palestine issue. They believed in a short, loose, and overt linkage between the two countries amplified by the establishment of a coherent basis for a settlement. However, Carter felt they were not "aiming high enough" and was interested in the establishment of a written "land for peace" agreement with Israel returning the Sinai Peninsula and West Bank. Numerous times both the Egyptian and Israeli leaders wanted to scrap negotiations, only to be lured back into the process by personal appeals from Carter.

Begin and Sadat had such mutual antipathy toward one another that they only seldom had direct contact; thus Carter had to conduct his own microcosmic form of shuttle diplomacy by holding one-on-one meetings with either Sadat or Begin in one cabin, then returning to the cabin of the third party to relay the substance of his discussions. Begin and Sadat were "literally not on speaking terms," and "claustrophobia was setting in."

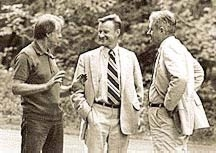
President Carter, National Security Advisor Zbigniew Brzezinski, and Secretary of State Cyrus Vance at Camp David

A particularly difficult situation arose on the tenth stalemated day of the talks. The issues of Israeli settlement withdrawal from the Sinai and the status of the West Bank created what seemed to be an impasse. In response, Carter had the choice of trying to salvage the agreement by conceding the issue of the West Bank to Begin, while advocating Sadat's less controversial position on the removal of all settlements from the Sinai Peninsula. Or he could have refused to continue the talks, reported the reasons for their failure, and allowed Begin to bear the brunt of the blame.

Carter chose to continue and for three more days negotiated. During this time, Carter even took the two leaders to the nearby Gettysburg National Military Park in the hopes of using the American Civil War as a simile to their own struggle.

Consequently, the 13 days marking the Camp David Accords were considered a success, in part due to Carter's determination in obtaining an Israeli–Egyptian agreement, which represented considerable time focused on a singular international problem. Additionally, Carter was beneficiary to a fully pledged American foreign team. Likewise, the Israeli delegation had a stable of excellent talent in Ministers Dayan and Weizman and legal experts Dr. Meir Rosenne and Aharon Barak. Furthermore, the absence of the media contributed to the Accord's successes: there were no possibilities provided to either leader to reassure his political body or be driven to conclusions by members of his opposition. An eventual scrap of negotiations by either leader would have proven disastrous, resulting in taking the blame for the summit's failure as well as a disassociation from the White House. Ultimately, neither Begin nor Sadat was willing to risk those eventualities. Both of them had invested enormous amounts of political capital and time to reach an agreement.

== Partial agreements ==
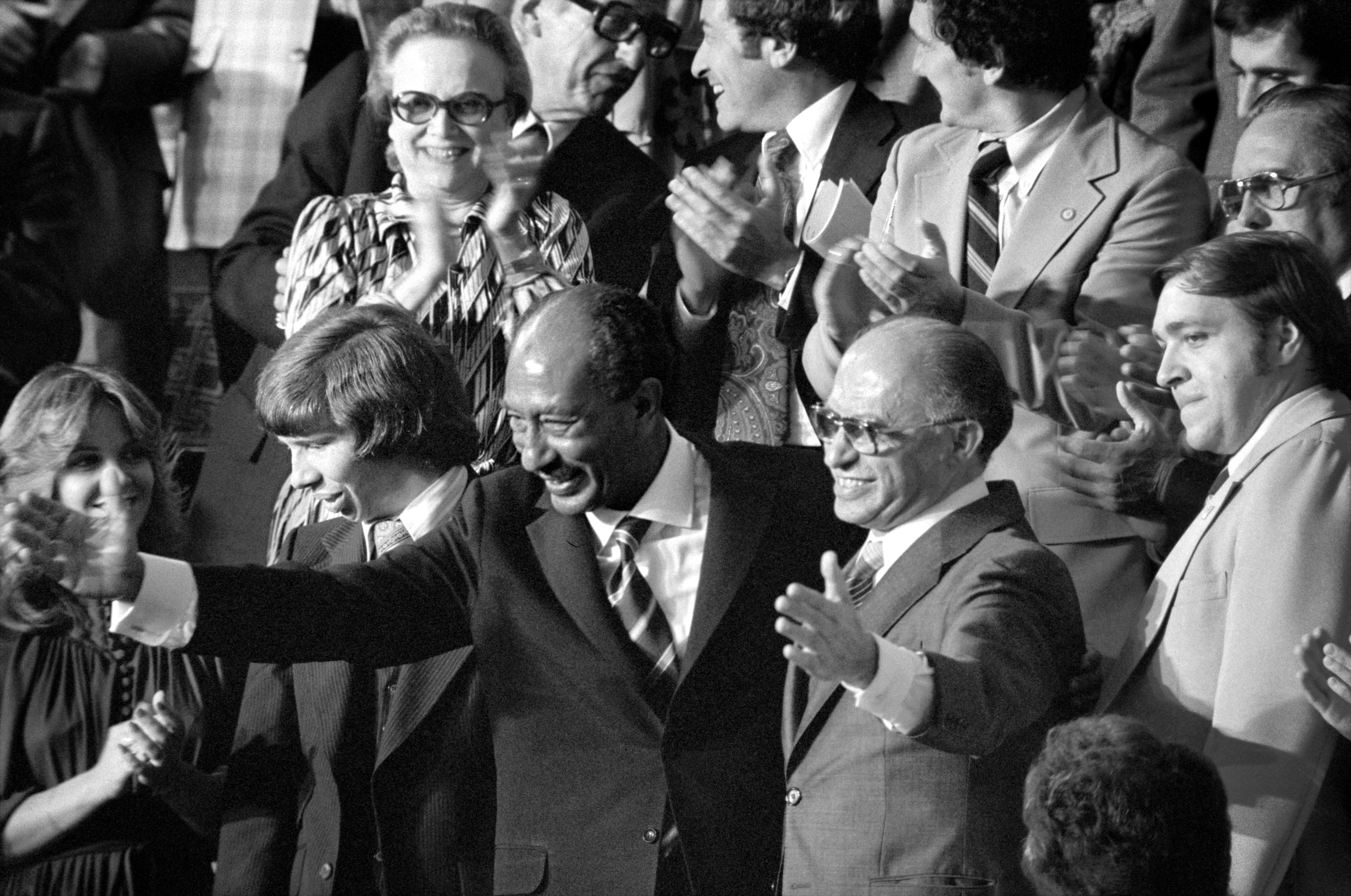
Egyptian president Anwar Sadat and Israeli prime minister Menachem Begin acknowledge applause during a joint session of Congress in Washington, D.C., during which President Jimmy Carter announced the results of the Camp David Accords, 18 September 1978.

"Remarks on the Signing of the Camp David Accords"
Jimmy Carter, seated with Egyptian president Anwar Sadat and Israeli prime minister Menachem Begin, makes statements at a Joint session of the United States Congress following the Camp David Accords.

The Camp David Accords comprise two separate agreements: "A Framework for Peace in the Middle East" and "A Framework for the Conclusion of a Peace Treaty between Egypt and Israel", the second leading towards the Egypt–Israel peace treaty signed in March 1979. The agreements and the peace treaty were both accompanied by "side-letters" of understanding between Egypt and the U.S. and Israel and the U.S.

=== Framework for Peace in the Middle East ===
The preamble of the "Framework for Peace in the Middle East" starts with the basis of a peaceful settlement of the Arab–Israeli conflict:

The agreed basis for a peaceful settlement of the conflict between Israel and its neighbors is United Nations Security Council Resolution 242, in all its parts.

The framework itself consists of 3 parts. The first part of the framework was to establish an autonomous self-governing authority in the West Bank and the Gaza Strip and to fully implement Resolution 242.

The Accords recognized the "legitimate rights of the Palestinian people", a process to be implemented guaranteeing the full autonomy of the people within a period of five years. The Israeli prime minister Begin insisted on the adjective "full" to ensure that it was the maximum political right attainable; however, Begin also specifically insisted that "on no condition will there be a Palestinian state". This so-called 'full autonomy' was to be discussed with the participation of Israel, Egypt, Jordan and the Palestinians. The withdrawal of Israeli troops from the West Bank and Gaza was agreed to occur after an election of a self-governing authority to replace Israel's military government. The Accords did not mention the Golan Heights, Syria, or Lebanon. This was not the comprehensive peace that Kissinger, Ford, Carter, or Sadat had in mind during the previous American presidential transition. It was less clear than the agreements concerning the Sinai, and was later interpreted differently by Israel, Egypt, and the United States. The fate of Jerusalem was deliberately excluded from this agreement.

The second part of the framework dealt with Egyptian–Israeli relations, the real content worked out in the second Egypt–Israel framework. The third part, "Associated Principles," declared principles that should apply to relations between Israel and all of its Arab neighbors.

==== West Bank, Gaza and "the Palestinian problem" ====
- Egypt, Israel, Jordan and the representatives of the Palestinian people should participate in negotiations on the resolution of the Palestinian problem in all its aspects.
- (1.) Egypt and Israel agree that, in order to ensure a peaceful and orderly transfer of authority, and taking into account the security concerns of all the parties, there should be transitional arrangements for the West Bank and Gaza for a period not exceeding five years. In order to provide full autonomy to the inhabitants, under these arrangements the Israeli military government and its civilian administration will be withdrawn as soon as a self-governing authority has been freely elected by the inhabitants of these areas to replace the existing military government.
- (2.) Egypt, Israel, and Jordan will agree on the modalities for establishing elected self-governing authority in the West Bank and Gaza. The delegations of Egypt and Jordan may include Palestinians from the West Bank and Gaza or other Palestinians as mutually agreed. The parties will negotiate an agreement which will define the powers and responsibilities of the self-governing authority to be exercised in the West Bank and Gaza. A withdrawal of Israeli armed forces will take place and there will be a redeployment of the remaining Israeli forces into specified security locations. The agreement will also include arrangements for assuring internal and external security and public order. A strong local police force will be established, which may include Jordanian citizens. In addition, Israeli and Jordanian forces will participate in joint patrols and in the manning of control posts to assure the security of the borders.
- (3.) When the self-governing authority (administrative council) in the West Bank and Gaza is established and inaugurated, the transitional period of five years will begin. As soon as possible, but not later than the third year after the beginning of the transitional period, negotiations will take place to determine the final status of the West Bank and Gaza and its relationship with its neighbors and to conclude a peace treaty between Israel and Jordan by the end of the transitional period. These negotiations will be conducted among Egypt, Israel, Jordan and the elected representatives of the inhabitants of the West Bank and Gaza. ... The negotiations shall be based on all the provisions and principles of UN Security Council Resolution 242. The negotiations will resolve, among other matters, the location of the boundaries and the nature of the security arrangements. The solution from the negotiations must also recognize the legitimate right of the Palestinian peoples and their just requirements.

The framework merely concerned autonomy of the inhabitants of West Bank and Gaza. It neither mentions the status of Jerusalem, nor the Palestinian Right of Return.

==== Criticism on the concept of 'autonomy' ====
The French historian, arabist, orientalist and professor Jean-Pierre Filiu, diplomatic adviser to three French ministers between 1990 and 2002, and also U.S.-born (with Palestinian roots) historian and Professor Rashid Khalidi, in the years 2013–2014 criticised the concept of 'autonomy' as used in the Camp David Accords: it is "devoid of meaning and content", it does not facilitate Palestinian's "right to liberty and self-determination" (etc.). The Israeli prime minister Menachem Begin, these professors say, had emphatically construed an 'autonomy'-concept that did not include (or according to Begin not even allowed for) a Palestinian state to be created. This flawed non-sovereignty-concept would be repeated in the 1993 Oslo Accords, Khalidi asserted.

==== UN Rejection of the Middle East Framework ====
The UN General Assembly rejected the Framework for Peace in the Middle East, because the agreement was concluded without participation of UN and PLO and did not comply with the Palestinian right of return, of self-determination and to national independence and sovereignty. In December 1978, it declared in Resolution 33/28 A that agreements were only valid if they are within the framework of the United Nations and its Charter and its resolutions, include the Palestinian right of return and the right to national independence and sovereignty in Palestine, and concluded with the participation of the PLO. On 6 December 1979, the UN condemned in Resolution 34/70 all partial agreements and separate treaties that did not meet the Palestinian rights and comprehensive solutions to peace; it condemned Israel's continued occupation and demanded withdrawal from all occupied territories. On 12 December, in Resolution 34/65 B, the UN rejected more specific parts of the Camp David Accords and similar agreements, which were not in accordance with mentioned requirements. All such partial agreements and separate treaties were strongly condemned. The part of the Camp David Accords regarding the Palestinian future and all similar ones were declared invalid.

=== Framework Peace Treaty Egypt and Israel ===
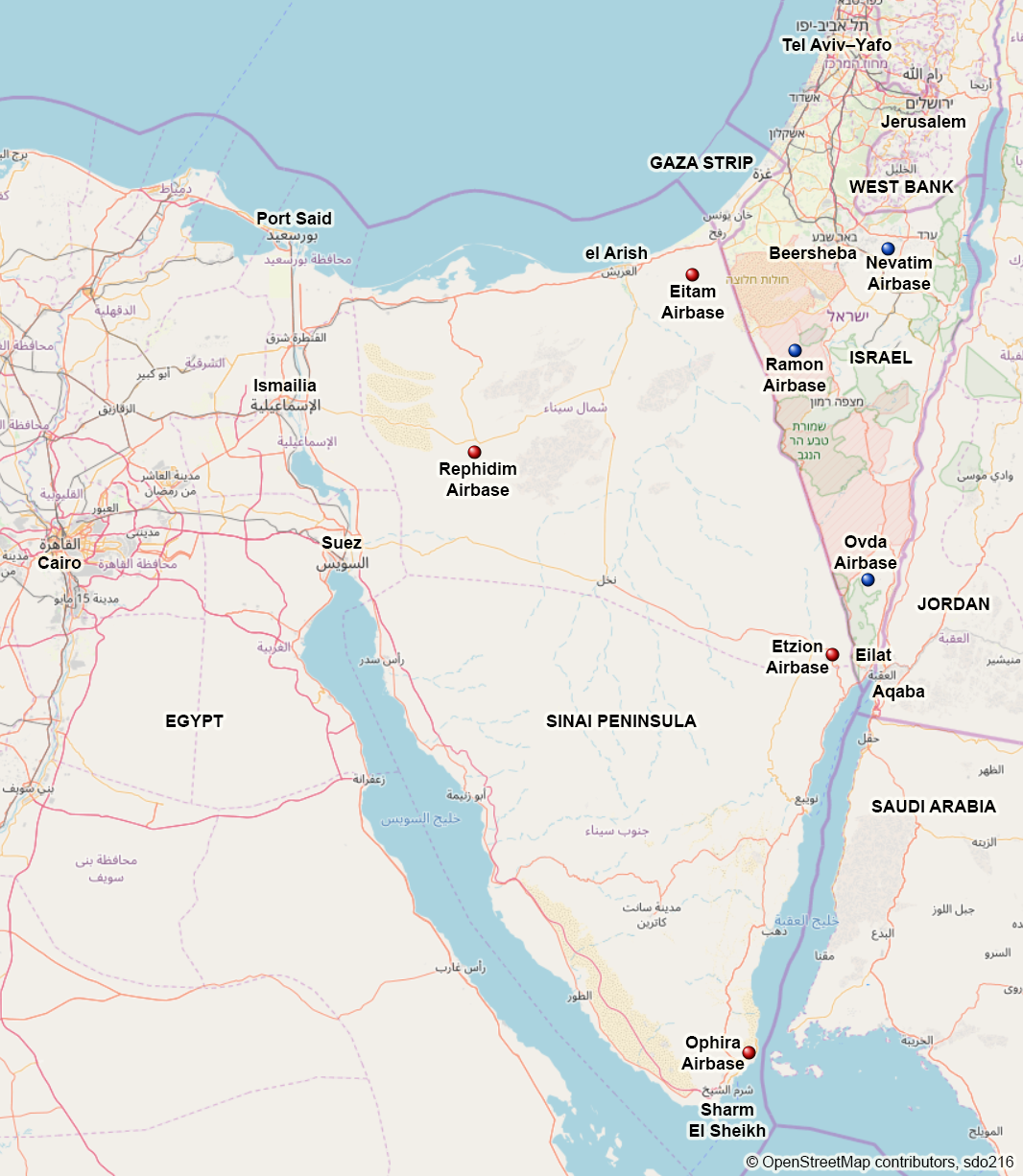
Abandoned IAF bases on the Sinai Peninsula (red) and newly established bases in southern Israel (blue)

The second framework outlined a basis for the peace treaty six months later, in particular deciding the future of the Sinai Peninsula. Israel agreed to withdraw its armed forces from the Sinai, gave up its four air bases that had been built there since the Six-Day War (see map to the right), evacuate its 4,500 civilian inhabitants, and restore it to Egypt in return for normal diplomatic relations with Egypt, guarantees of freedom of passage through the Suez Canal and other nearby waterways (such as the Straits of Tiran), and a restriction on the forces Egypt could place on the Sinai peninsula, especially within 20–40 km from Israel. This process would take three years to complete. Israel also agreed to limit its forces a smaller distance (3 km) from the Egyptian border, and to guarantee free passage between Egypt and Jordan. With the withdrawal, Israel also returned Egypt's Abu-Rudeis oil fields in western Sinai, which contained long term, commercially productive wells.

== Implementation and outcomes ==
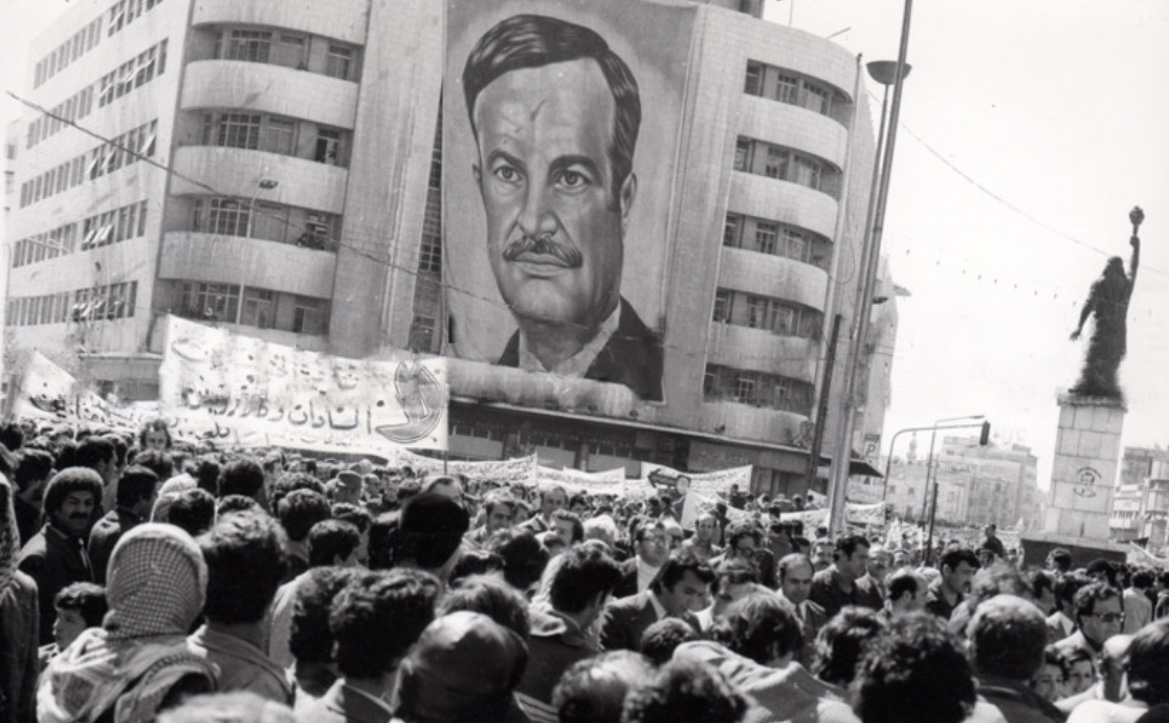
Anti Camp-David accords demonstration in Damascus, Syria, 1978.

The Camp David Accords changed Middle Eastern politics. Notably, the perception of Egypt within the Arab world changed. With the most powerful of the Arab militaries and a history of leadership in the Arab world under Nasser, Egypt had more leverage than any of the other Arab states to advance Arab interests. Egypt was subsequently suspended from the Arab League from 1979 until 1989.

Jordan's King Hussein saw it as a slap to the face when Sadat volunteered Jordan's participation in deciding how functional autonomy for the Palestinians would work. Specifically, Sadat effectively said that Jordan would have a role in how the West Bank would be administered. Like the Rabat Summit Resolution, the Camp David Accords circumscribed Jordan's objective to reassert its control over the West Bank. Focusing as it did on Egypt, the Carter administration accepted Sadat's claim that he could deliver Hussein. However, with Arab world opposition building against Sadat, Jordan could not risk accepting the Accords without the support of powerful Arab neighbours, like Iraq, Saudi Arabia, and Syria. Hussein consequently felt diplomatically snubbed. One of Carter's regrets was allowing Sadat to claim that he could speak for Hussein if Jordan refused to join the talks, but by then the damage was done to the Jordanians.

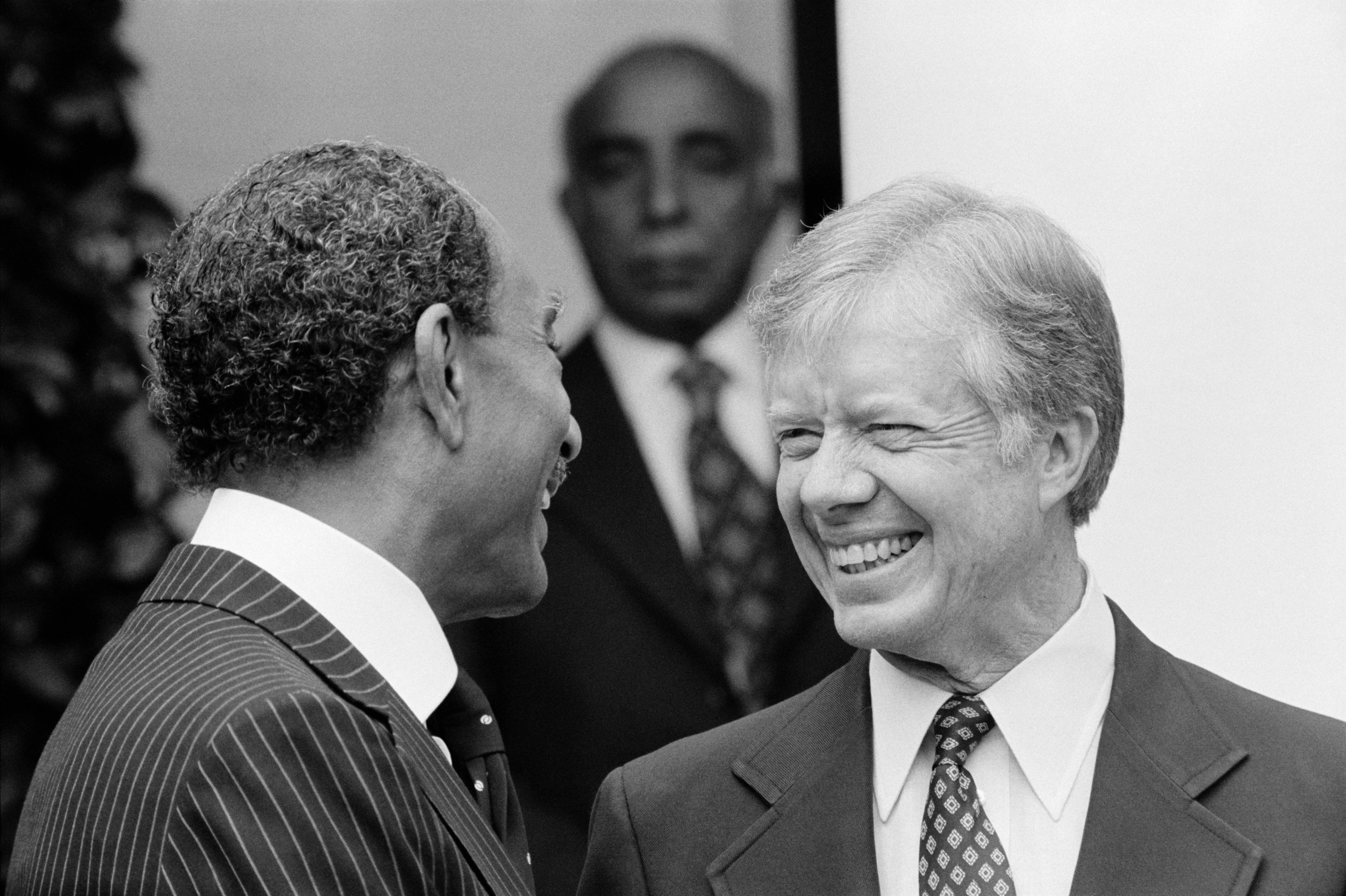
United States President Jimmy Carter greeting Egyptian president Anwar Sadat at the White House shortly after the Camp David Accords went into effect, 8 April 1980.

The Camp David Accords also prompted the disintegration of a unified Arab front in opposition to Israel. Egypt's realignment created a power vacuum that Saddam Hussein of Iraq, at one time only a secondary power, hoped to fill. Because of the vague language concerning the implementation of Resolution 242, the Palestinian problem became the primary issue in the Arab–Israeli conflict. Many of the Arab nations blamed Egypt for not putting enough pressure on Israel to deal with the Palestinian problem in a way that would be satisfactory to them. Syria also informed Egypt that it would not reconcile with the nation unless it abandoned the peace agreement with Israel.

According to The Continuum Political Encyclopedia of the Middle East:

The normalization of relations [between Israel and Egypt] went into effect in January 1980. Ambassadors were exchanged in February. The boycott laws were repealed by Egypt's National Assembly the same month, and some trade began to develop, albeit less than Israel had hoped for. In March 1980 regular airline flights were inaugurated. Egypt also began supplying Israel with crude oil".

According to Kenneth Stein in Heroic Diplomacy: Sadat, Kissinger, Carter, Begin, and the Quest for Arab–Israeli Peace:

The Accords were another interim agreement or step, but negotiations that flowed from the Accords slowed for several reasons. These included an inability to bring the Jordanians into the discussions; the controversy over settlements; the inconclusive nature of the subsequent autonomy talks; domestic opposition sustained by both Begin and Sadat and, in Sadat's case, ostracism and anger from the Arab world; the emergence of a what became a cold peace between Egypt and Israel; and changes in foreign policy priorities including discontinuity in personnel committed to sustaining the negotiating process[.]

Historian Jørgen Jensehaugen argues that by the time Carter left office in January 1981:

[Carter] was in an odd position—he had attempted to break with traditional US policy but ended up fulfilling the goals of that tradition, which had been to break up the Arab alliance, side-line the Palestinians, build an alliance with Egypt, weaken the Soviet Union and secure Israel.

== Israeli public support ==
Although most Israelis supported the Accords, the Israeli settler movement opposed them because Sadat's refusal to agree to a treaty in which Israel had any presence in the Sinai Peninsula at all meant they had to withdraw from the entire Sinai Peninsula. Israeli settlers tried to prevent the government from dismantling their settlements, but were unsuccessful.

In Israel, there is lasting support of the Camp David Peace Accords, which have become a national consensus, supported by 85% of Israelis according to a 2001 poll taken by the Jaffee Center for Strategic Studies (Israel-based).

== Assassination of Anwar Sadat ==
President Sadat's signing of the Camp David Accords on 17 September 1978 and his shared 1978 Nobel Peace Prize with Israeli prime minister Begin led to Sadat’s assassination on 6 October 1981 by members of the Egyptian Islamic Jihad during the annual victory parade held in Cairo to celebrate Egypt's crossing of the Suez Canal. The president's personal protection was infiltrated by four members of this organization, who were hiding in a truck passing through the military parade with other military vehicles. As the truck approached the president, the leader of the belligerents – Lieutenant Khalid Islambouli – came out of the truck and threw three grenades towards the president; only one of the three exploded. The rest of the team opened fire with automatic assault rifles and struck President Sadat with 37 rounds. He was airlifted to a military hospital, where he died two hours after arriving.

In total, 11 were killed from collateral gunfire and 28 were injured. Among the killed were the Cuban ambassador, an Omani general, and a Coptic Orthodox bishop. Among the wounded were Egyptian Vice-President Hosni Mubarak, Irish Defence Minister James Tully, and four U.S. military liaison officers. One of the assassins was killed and the other three were wounded and taken into custody. The surviving assassins were tried and found guilty of assassinating the president and killing 10 others in the process; they were sentenced to capital punishment, and were executed on 15 April 1982.

== Arab–Israeli peace diplomacy and treaties ==
Treaties and meetings

- Paris Peace Conference, 1919
- Faisal–Weizmann Agreement (1919)
- 1949 Armistice Agreements
- Geneva Conference (1973)
- Camp David Accords (1978)
- Egypt–Israel peace treaty (1979)
- Madrid Conference of 1991
- Oslo Accords (1993)
- Israel–Jordan peace treaty (1994)
- Camp David 2000 Summit
- Philadelphi Accord (2005)
- Abraham Accords (2020)

General articles

- International law and the Arab–Israeli conflict
- Israeli–Palestinian peace process
- List of Middle East peace proposals
- Projects working for peace among Israelis and Arabs

== See also ==
- 1948 Arab–Israeli War
- 1956 Suez War
- 1967 Six-Day War
- 1970 War of Attrition
- 1973 Yom Kippur War
- Arab–Israeli conflict
- Arab League and the Arab–Israeli conflict
- Egypt–Israel relations
- Israeli–Palestinian conflict
- Palestinian autonomy talks
- History of the State of Palestine
