= Sinai Interim Agreement =

Egyptian–Israeli diplomatic agreement

- Type: Bilateral treaty
- Signed: 4 September 1975
- Location: Geneva, Switzerland
- Original signatories: Egypt; Israel

The Sinai Interim Agreement, also known as the Sinai II Agreement, was a diplomatic agreement signed by Egypt and Israel on September 4, 1975, with the intention of peacefully resolving territorial disputes. The signing ceremony took place in Geneva.

The agreement stated that the conflicts between the countries "shall not be resolved by military force but by peaceful means." It also called "for a further withdrawal in the Sinai and a new UN buffer zone." Thus, the agreement strengthened Israel's and Egypt's commitment to abiding by United Nations Security Council Resolution 338 and strengthened diplomatic relations between Egypt, Israel, and the United States.

The purpose of this agreement, in the eyes of the Egyptians, was to gain back as much of the Sinai Peninsula (which had been occupied by Israel since 1967) as they could through diplomacy. Although the agreement strengthened Egypt's relationship with the Western world, it strained its relationships with other members of the Arab League, especially Syria and the Palestine Liberation Organization (PLO).

== See also ==
- Arab–Israeli conflict
- Egypt–Israel peace treaty
- Israel–Egypt Disengagement Treaty of 1974
- Egypt–Israel relations
