= Fawzia of Egypt =

Queen of Iran from 1941 to 1948

Fawzia
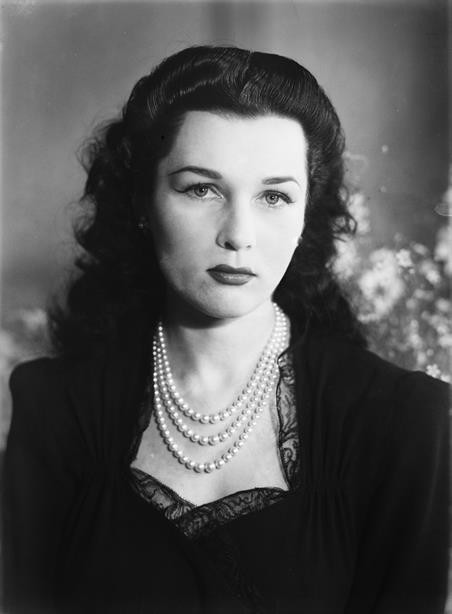
- Fawzia in the 1940s

Queen consort of Iran
- Tenure: 16 September 1941 – 17 November 1948
- Born: 5 November 1921; Ras El Tin Palace, Alexandria, Sultanate of Egypt
- Died: 2 July 2013 (aged 91); Alexandria, Egypt
- Burial: Al-Rifa'i Mosque, Cairo, Egypt
- Spouse: Mohammad Reza Pahlavi (m. 1939; div. 1948) Ismail Chirine (m. 1949; died 1994)
- Issue: Shahnaz Pahlavi; Nadia Chirine; Hussein Chirine
- House: Alawiyya (by birth); Pahlavi (by marriage)
- Father: Fuad I of Egypt
- Mother: Nazli Sabri

Fawzia of Egypt (Egyptian Arabic: فوزية; 5 November 1921 – 2 July 2013), also known as Fawzia Pahlavi or Fawzia Chirine, was an Egyptian princess who became Shahbanu of Iran as the first wife of Mohammad Reza Pahlavi, Shah of Iran. Fawzia was the daughter of Fuad I, seventh son of Ismail the Magnificent.

Her marriage to the Iranian Crown Prince in 1939 was a political deal: it consolidated Egyptian power and influence in the Middle East, while bringing respectability to the new Iranian regime by association with the much more prestigious Egyptian royal house. Fawzia obtained an Egyptian divorce in 1948, under which their one daughter Princess Shahnaz would be brought up in Iran. Fawzia, who was known as the "sad queen" in the press, lived in isolation and silence after the 1952 Egyptian revolution and never published her memories of the court of Iran and Egypt. In 1949, Fawzia married Colonel Ismail Chirine, an Egyptian diplomat, with whom she had a son and a daughter.

== Early life and education ==
Princess Fawzia was born Her Sultanic Highness Princess Fawzia bint Fuad at Ras El Tin Palace, Alexandria, the eldest daughter of Sultan Fuad I of Egypt and Sudan (later King Fuad I), and his second wife, Nazli Sabri on 5 November 1921.

In addition to her sisters, Faiza, Faika and Fathia, and her brother, Farouk, she had two half-siblings, Fawkia and Ismail, from her father's previous marriage to Princess Shwikar Effendi.

Fawzia was raised by multiple nannies, including Anne Eugene, an English nanny, with whom she and her sisters kept contact after the royal family were overthrown. She was homeschooled from the age of four. Among her teachers: Lady ‘Alia Abdel Karim,’ who taught her religion; and Lady ‘Karima El-Saeed,’ the sister of Amina El-Saeed, who taught her general knowledge. Fawzia had lessons in Arabic, English and French.

She complained to ‘Naima Youssef,’ the sports instructor, that Queen Nazli blamed her for her lack of desire to learn any sport. Princess Fawzia only learned tennis and table tennis, in which she achieved great success.

In 1937, Fawzia travelled outside Egypt for the first time, accompanying her family on a tour of Europe.

== Marriage ==
The marriage of Princess Fawzia to Iran's Crown Prince Mohammad Reza Pahlavi was planned by the latter's father, Reza Shah. A declassified CIA report in May 1972 described the union as a political move. The marriage was also significant in that it united a Sunni royal, the princess, and a Shia royal, the crown prince. The Pahlavis were a parvenu house as Reza Khan, the son of a peasant who entered the Iranian Army as a private, rising up to become a general, had seized power in a 1921 coup. He was most anxious to have the House of Pahlavi married to the House of Muhammad Ali, which had reigned over Egypt since 1805.

The Egyptians were not impressed with the gifts sent by Reza Shah to King Farouk to persuade him to marry his sister to the prince Mohammad Reza. When an Iranian delegation arrived in Cairo to arrange the marriage, the Egyptians took the Iranians on a tour of the palaces built by Isma'il Pasha, known as "Isma'il the Magnificent", to show them proper royal splendor. King Farouk was not initially interested in marrying off his sister to the Crown Prince of Iran, but Aly Maher Pasha, the king's favorite political adviser, persuaded him that a marriage alliance with Iran would improve Egypt's position within the Islamic world and against Britain. At the same time, Maher Pasha was working on plans to marry off Farouk's other sisters to King Faisal II of Iraq and to the son of Emir Abdullah of Jordan, intending to forge an Egyptian-dominated bloc in the Middle East. To prepare for life in Iran, Fawzia was assigned a tutor to teach her Persian.

Fawzia and Pahlavi were engaged in May 1938. However, they saw each other only once before their wedding. They married at the Abdeen Palace in Cairo on 15 March 1939. King Farouk took the couple on a tour of Egypt, showing them the pyramids, Al-Azhar University, and other famous sites. The contrast between the Crown Prince Mohammad Reza, dressed in the simple uniform of an Iranian officer, and the lavish opulence of the Egyptian court typified by the famously free-spending Farouk in his expensive suits, was much remarked upon at the time. After the wedding, King Farouk had a twenty-course meal to celebrate the nuptials at the Abdeen Palace. At the time Prince Mohammad Reza lived in awe of his overbearing father, Reza Shah, and was dominated by Farouk, who was considerably more self-confident. Afterwards, Fawzia departed for Iran together with her mother, Queen Nazli, on a train trip that saw the electricity break down several times, causing the two women to feel like they were going on a camping trip.

When they returned to Iran the wedding ceremony was repeated at the Marble Palace, Tehran, which was also their future residence. As Mohammad Reza spoke no Turkish (one of the languages of the Egyptian elite, the other being French) and Fawzia was described as being only "competent" in Persian, the two talked to each other in French, in which both were fluent. Upon arriving in Tehran, Reza Shah had the main streets of Tehran decorated with banners and arches, and had a celebration at the Amjadieh stadium attended by 25,000 of the Iranian elite with synchronized acrobatics by students being followed by bastani (Iranian calisthenics), fencing, and football. The wedding dinner was a French-style dinner with "caviar from the Caspian Sea", "Consommé Royal", fish, fowl and lamb. Fawzia disliked Reza Khan, whom she described as a violent and thuggish man prone to attacking people with either his whip or riding crop. In contrast to the French food she had grown up with in Egypt, Fawzia found the food at the Iranian court sub-par. In the same way, Fawzia found that the palaces of Iran could not be compared to the palaces that she had grown up in in Egypt.

== Queen of Iran ==
Following the marriage, the Princess was granted Iranian nationality. Two years later the crown prince succeeded his exiled father and was to become the Shah of Iran. Soon after her husband's ascent to the throne, Queen Fawzia appeared on the cover of the 21 September 1942, issue of Life magazine, photographed by Cecil Beaton, who described her as an "Asian Venus" with "a perfect heart-shaped face and strangely pale but piercing blue eyes." She led the newly founded Association for the Protection of Pregnant Women and Children (APPWC) in Iran.

With Mohammad Reza Shah Pahlavi, she had one child, a daughter:

- HIH Princess Shahnaz Pahlavi (born 27 October 1940).

The marriage was a failure. Fawzia was deeply unhappy in Iran, and often missed her homeland of Egypt. Fawzia's relations with her mother-in-law and her sisters-in-law were notably tempestuous as the Queen Mother and her daughters saw her as a rival for Mohammad Reza Shah's affections, and the women constantly feuded with each other. One of Mohammad Reza's sisters broke a vase over Fawzia's head. The womanizing Mohammad Reza Shah was frequently unfaithful to Fawzia, and was often seen driving around with other women in Tehran from 1940 onward. Popular rumor had it that Fawzia for her part had an affair with her minder, described as an athletic, handsome man, though her friends insist that this was merely malicious gossip. Fawzia's son-in-law, Ardeshir Zahedi told the Iranian-American historian Abbas Milani in a 2009 interview about the rumors: "She is a lady and never veered from the path of purity and fidelity". From 1944 onward, Fawzia was treated for depression by an American psychiatrist, as she stated her marriage was a loveless one and she desperately wanted to go back to Egypt.

Queen Fawzia (the title of empress was not yet used in Iran at that time) moved to Cairo in May 1945 and obtained an Egyptian divorce. The reason for her return was that she viewed Tehran as underdeveloped in contrast to modern, cosmopolitan Cairo. She consulted an American psychiatrist in Baghdad for her troubles shortly before she left Tehran. On the other hand, CIA reports claim that Princess Fawzia ridiculed and humiliated the Shah due to his supposed impotence, leading to their separation. In her book Ashraf Pahlavi, twin sister of the Shah, argues that it was the Princess not the Shah who asked for divorce. Fawzia left Iran for Egypt, and despite numerous attempts on the part of the Shah to persuade her to return, she remained put in Cairo. Mohammad Reza told the British ambassador in 1945 that his mother was "probably the main obstacle to the return of the Queen".

This divorce was first not recognized for several years by Iran, but eventually an official divorce was obtained in Iran, on 17 November 1948, with Queen Fawzia successfully reclaiming her previous distinction of Princess of Egypt as well. A major condition of the divorce was that her daughter be left behind to be raised in Iran. Incidentally, Queen Fawzia's brother, King Farouk, also divorced his first wife, Queen Farida, in November 1948.

In the official announcement of the divorce, it was stated that "the Persian climate had endangered the health of Queen Fawzia, and that thus it was agreed that the Egyptian King's sister be divorced." In another official statement, the Shah said that the dissolution of the marriage "cannot affect by any means the existing friendly relations between Egypt and Iran." After her divorce Princess Fawzia headed the Egyptian court.

== Charity work and patronages ==
Following her divorce in 1948, Fawzia headed the Egyptian Court. She became president of the Muhammad Ali charity organization, the youngest person to hold the position.

During Princess Fawzia's presidency of the Mohamed Ali Charity, the period was described as the organization's "golden age" due to the expansion of its network of hospitals and projects across Egypt. In April 1947, Princess Fawzia inaugurated a hospital in Asyut, accompanied by Princesses Faiza and Mahivech Toussoun. The foundation stone for a maternity hospital in El Mahalla El Kubra was laid on 11 February 1948, and the facility opened on 16 April 1952.

On 13 March 1948, a hospital belonging to the charity opened in Port Said at the villa of Lotfy Pasha. Lotfy had donated £E14,000 in March 1944 to fund the establishment of the hospital, an act for which King Farouk awarded him the title of Pasha. Princess Fawzia attended the official opening of the hospital on 20 March 1948.

== Later life ==
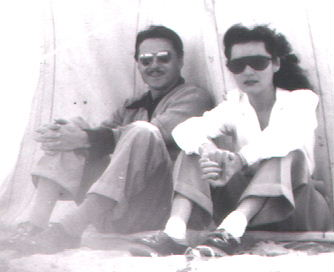
Princess Fawzia with Ismail Chirine

On 28 March 1949, at the Koubba Palace in Cairo, Princess Fawzia married Colonel Ismail Chirine (or Shirin) (1919–1994), who was the eldest son of Hussein Chirine Bey and his wife, HH Princess Amina Bihruz Khanum Effendi. He was a graduate of Trinity College, Cambridge, and a one-time Egyptian minister of war and the navy. Following the wedding they lived in an estate owned by the Princess in Maadi, Cairo. They also resided in a villa in Smouha, Alexandria. Unlike her first marriage, this time Fawzia married for love and she was described as far happier being married to Colonel Chirine than she ever had been to the Shah of Iran.

They had two children, one daughter and one son:

- Nadia Chirine (19 December 1950, Cairo – October 2009). She married firstly (and divorced) Yusuf Shabaan, an Egyptian actor. Her second husband was Mustafa Rashid. She had two daughters, one with each husband:
  - Sinai Shabaan (born October 1973)
  - Fawzia Rashid
- Hussein Chirine (1955–2016)

Fawzia lived in Egypt after the 1952 Revolution that toppled King Farouk.

Princess Fawzia's death was mistakenly reported in January 2005. Journalists had confused her with her niece, Princess Fawzia Farouk (1940–2005), one of the three daughters of King Farouk.

== Death ==
In her later life, Princess Fawzia lived in Alexandria, where she died on 2 July 2013 at the age of 91. Her funeral ceremony was held after noon prayers at Sayeda Nafisa Mosque in Cairo on 3 July. She was buried in Cairo next to her second husband. At the time of her death, she was the oldest member of the deposed Muhammad Ali dynasty residing in Egypt.

== Legacy ==
A town in Iran, Fawziabad, was named for Princess Fawzia in 1939. A street in Maadi, Cairo, was again named for her in 1950 as Amira Fawzia street, but in 1956 it was renamed as Mustafa Kamel street.

== Honours ==
- (Kingdom of Egypt) Egypt: Decoration of al-Kamal in brilliants (16 May 1939)
- (Pahlavi Iran) Iran: Grand Cordon of the Order of Khorshid (27 October 1940)

== Gallery ==
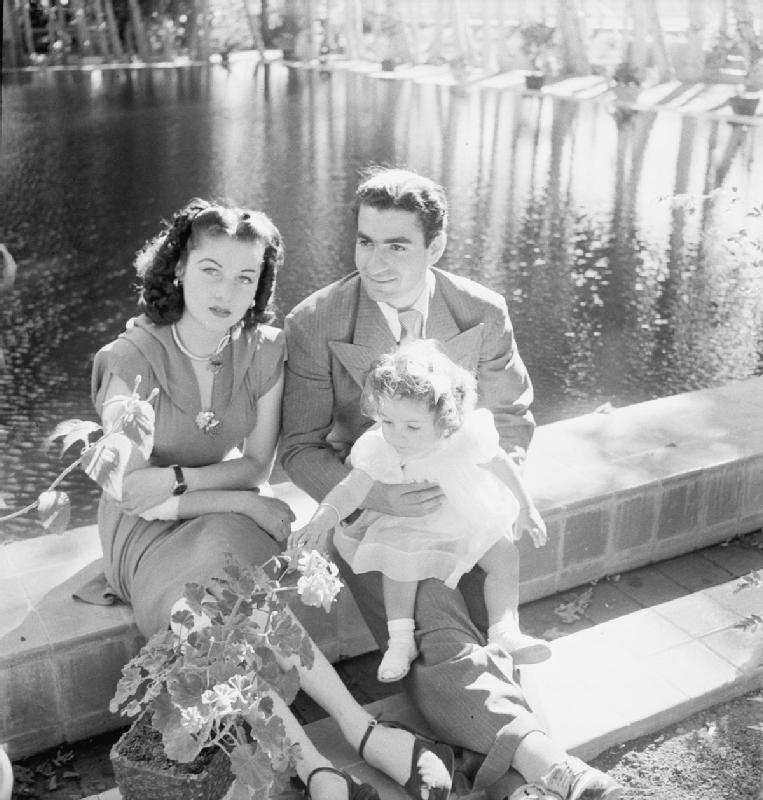
Queen Fawzia with Mohammad Reza Shah and their daughter, Princess Shahnaz, in Tehran during the Second World War.

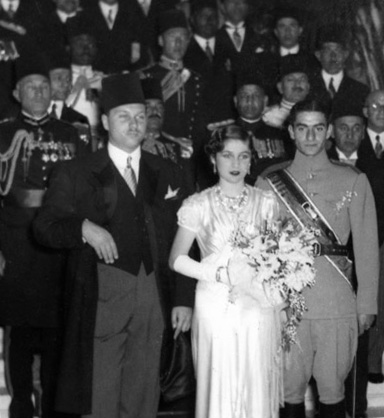
The wedding ceremony of Princess Fawzia and Prince Mohammad Reza. From left to right: King Farouk of Egypt (the bride's brother), Princess Fawzia (the bride) and the Crown Prince of Iran (the groom).

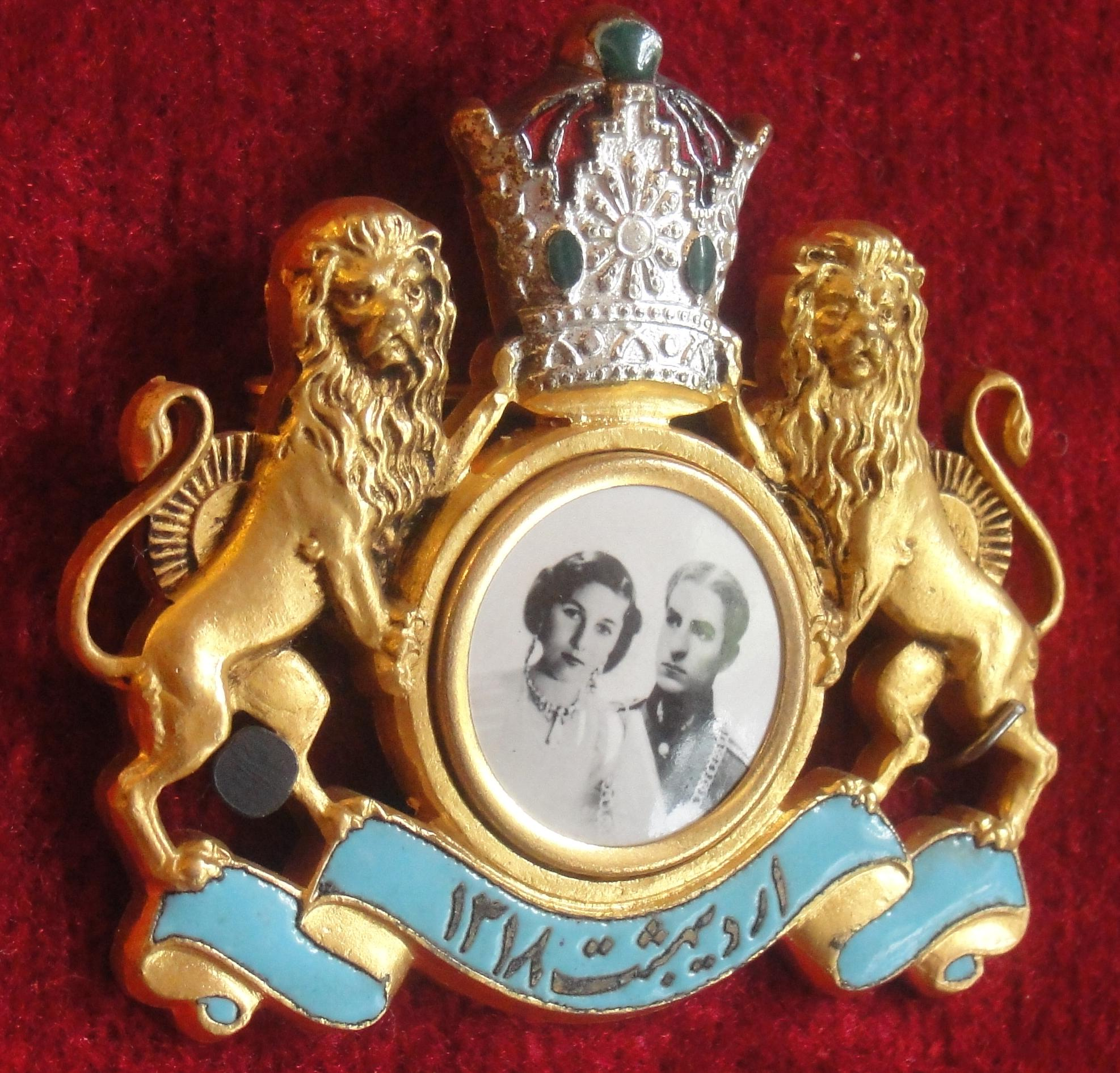
Commemoration Medallion of Marriage of Mohammad Reza Pahlavi and Princess Fawzia of Egypt – March 1939 – The medallion is now in Sahebgharaniyeh Palace, Niavaran Palace Complex.

== Ancestry ==
Ancestors of Fawzia of Egypt

8. Ibrahim Pasha, Wāli of Egypt
4. Isma'il Pasha, Khedive of Egypt
9. Hoshiar Walda
2. Fuad I, King of Egypt
5. Ferial Hanim
1. Princess Fawzia of Egypt
6. Abdel Rahim Sabri Pasha, Governor of Cairo
3. Nazli Sabri
14. Mohamed Sherif Pasha, Prime Minister of Egypt
7. Tewfika Hanim
15. Nazli Hanim

== Sources ==
- El-Sharkawy, Eman (2024). صاحبات السمو الملكي [Her Royal Highnesses] (in Arabic). Al-Riwaq Publishing and Distribution. ISBN 978-977-824-225-6.
- Elwardany, Ola Hesham Abd El-Salam; Hemeda, Hossam Hassan; Zaki, Asaad Arafa (June 2022). "The Contributions of Princess Fawzia Fouad in the Egyptian and Iranian Societies between 1939–1952". Journal of the Faculty of Tourism and Hotels, University of Sadat City. 6 (1): 165–195. doi:10.21608/mfth.2022.270698.
- Mustafa, Tawfik, Ashraf (2000). فاروق الأول .. والأخير: هوانم القصر الملكي (in Arabic). مركز الراية للنشر والإعلام،. ISBN 978-977-5967-10-7.

Fawzia of Egypt House of Muhammad Ali Born: 5 November 1921 Died: 2 July 2013
Iranian royalty
Preceded by Tadj ol-Molouk	Queen consort of Iran; 1941–1948	Vacant Title next held by Soraya Esfandiary-Bakhtiary
