= Princess Faiza of Egypt =

Egyptian royal (1923–1994)

Princess Faiza
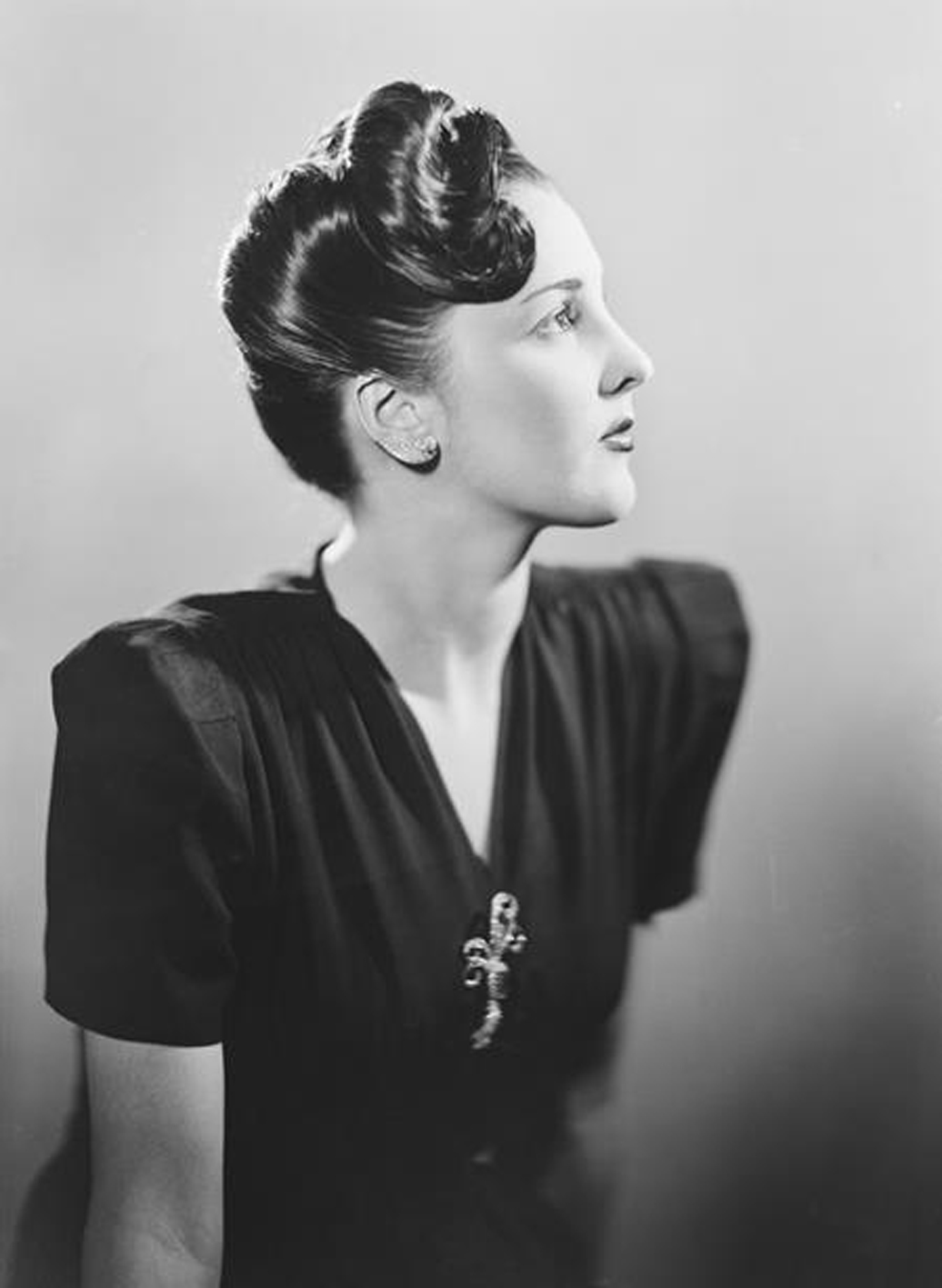
- Born: 8 November 1923; Abdeen Palace, Cairo, Kingdom of Egypt
- Died: 6 June 1994 (aged 70); Westwood, Los Angeles, United States
- Burial: Westwood Village Memorial Park
- Spouse: Mohammad Ali Bulent Rauf (m. 1945; div. 1962)
- House: Muhammad Ali
- Father: Fuad I
- Mother: Nazli Sabri

Princess Faiza (Arabic: الأميرة فايزة; 8 November 1923 – 6 June 1994) was an Egyptian princess and a member of the Muhammad Ali dynasty.

== Early life ==
Princess Faiza was born in the Abdeen Palace, Cairo, on 8 November 1923. She was the third child of King Fuad I and Nazli Sabri. Princess Faiza was the sister of King Farouk, Princess Fawzia, Princess Faika and Princess Fathia. Her maternal great-grandfather was Major-General Muhammad Sharif Pasha, prime minister and minister for foreign affairs, who was of Turkish origin.

== Marriage and activities ==
Princess Faiza did not want to marry a member of the Middle East royal family. Instead, she married her Turkish cousin Bulent Rauf, who was thirty-four years old, in Cairo on 17 May 1945. Their marriage was arranged through familial relations. He was a Western educated man and the grandson of Ismail Pasha. King Farouk did not support their marriage, but reluctantly endorsed it. Princess Faiza and her husband lived in the Zohria Palace on Gezira Island on the Nile after their marriage.

Princess Faiza was instrumental in Princess Fawzia's long period of convalescence in Egypt after divorcing from the Shah of Iran in 1948. Faiza was one of the leading figures of the Red Crescent Society in Egypt during the reign of King Farouk. King Farouk put her and her husband under house arrest due to his suspicion. She and her husband launched a homemade film about a military coup six weeks before the events of 1952. They had no issue, and divorced in 1962.

== Later life and death ==
After the abdication of King Farouk following the 1952 Revolution in Egypt, Princess Faiza moved to Istanbul in 1954. Then, she and her husband went to Spain and France. Next, she went to the US and settled in Beverly Hills, leaving her husband in Paris.

Princess Faiza died on 9 June 1994 at the age of 70 in Westwood, Los Angeles.

== Ancestry ==
Ancestors of Princess Faiza of Egypt

8. Ibrahim Pasha of Egypt
4. Isma'il Pasha of Egypt
9. Hoshiar Walda
2. Fuad I of Egypt
5. Ferial Qadin
1. Princess Faiza of Egypt
6. Abdel Rahim Sabri Pasha
3. Nazli Sabri
14. Mohamed Sherif Pasha
7. Tewfika Sherif
15. Nazli Sève
