= Princess Faika of Egypt =

Egyptian royal (1926–1983)

Princess Faika
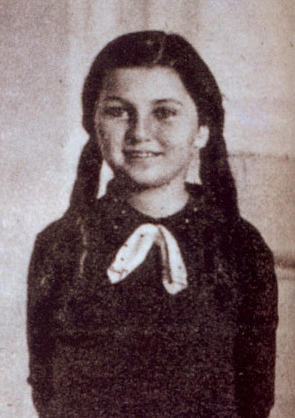
- Born: 8 June 1926; Ras al Tin Palace, Alexandria, Kingdom of Egypt
- Died: 7 January 1983 (aged 56); Cairo, Egypt
- Spouse: Fouad Sadek
- Issue: Fouad Sadek; Ismail Sadek; Fawkia Sadek; Fahima Sadek
Names
- Faika Fuad Sadek
- House: Muhammad Ali
- Father: Fuad I
- Mother: Nazli Sabri

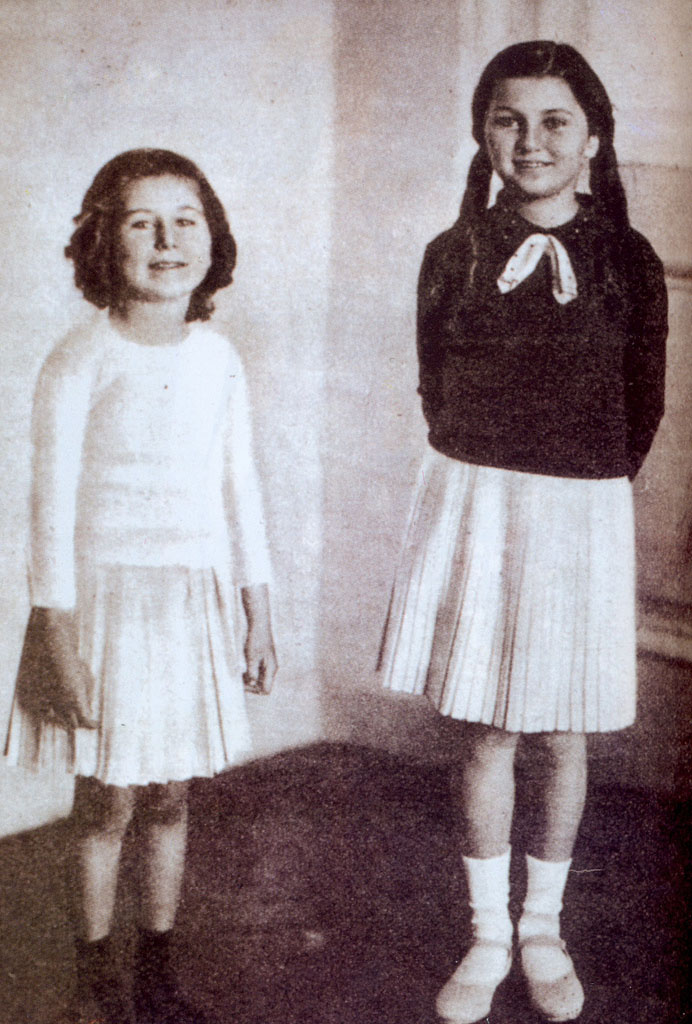
Princess Faika (right) and her younger sister Princess Fathia

Princess Faika (Arabic: الأميرة فائقة, 8 June 1926 – 7 January 1983) was an Egyptian royal and a member of the Muhammad Ali dynasty.

== Early life ==
Faika Sadek was born at the Ras al Tin Palace, Alexandria, on 8 June 1926. She was one of the daughters of King Fuad I and Nazli Sabri and the sister of King Farouk, Princess Fawzia, Princess Faiza and Princess Fathia. Her maternal great-grandfather was Major-General Muhammad Sharif Pasha, prime minister and minister of foreign affairs, who was of Turkish origin.

== Personal life ==
Faika married Fouad Sadek, an Egyptian commoner and a consular officer, in a civil ceremony on 5 April 1950 in San Francisco. At first, King Farouk did not endorse the marriage, but later he confirmed it. Then they married in a religious ceremony at the Kubba Palace in Cairo on 4 June 1950. Faika's husband was given the title of "bey" after the marriage. The couple lived in the Dokki Palace on the Nile and Fouad Sadek began to work at the foreign ministry of Egypt. They had four children, two daughters and two sons.

== Death ==
Faika died in Cairo on 7 January 1983 at the age of 56 following a long illness.

== Ancestry ==
Ancestors of Princess Faika of Egypt

8. Ibrahim Pasha of Egypt
4. Khedive Ismail
9. Hoshiar Walda
2. King Fuad
5. Ferial Hanim
1. Princess Faika of Egypt
6. Abdel Rahim Sabri Pasha
3. Nazli Sabri
14. Muhammad Sharif Pasha
7. Tewfika Hanim
15. Nazli Hanim
