= Princess Fathia of Egypt =

Egyptian princess (1930–1976)

Princess Fathia
- Born: 17 December 1930; Koubbeh Palace, Cairo, Kingdom of Egypt
- Died: 10 December 1976 (aged 45); Los Angeles, California, United States
- Burial: Holy Cross Cemetery, Culver City, California, United States
- Spouse: Riyad Ghali (m. 1950; div. 1973)
- Issue: Rafiq Ghali; Rayed Ghali; Rania Ghali
- House: Muhammad Ali
- Father: Fuad I
- Mother: Nazli Sabri

Princess Fathia (Arabic: الأميرة فتحية; 17 December 1930 – 10 December 1976) was an Egyptian princess and the youngest sister of King Farouk I. In 1950, she moved to the United States and married Riyad Ghali, a Coptic Egyptian diplomat, despite the refusal of her brother and the royal council. Consequently, King Farouk stripped both Fathia and her mother Queen Nazli of their royal titles, privileges, and citizenship.

== Early life ==
Fathia was born on 17 December 1930 at Koubbeh Palace, Cairo. She was the youngest daughter of King Fuad I and his second wife, Nazli Sabri.

In addition to her three sisters: Faiza, Faika, Fawzia, and brother Farouk, she had two half-siblings: Fawkia and Ismail, from her father's previous marriage to Shivakiar Ibrahim.

Her father was 62 years old at the time of her birth and was disappointed by the birth of a female child, as he was desperate to secure the throne with a direct male heir.

The famous Egyptian poet Ahmed Shawqi sent a congratulatory telegram to King Fuad:

A greeting of a world that lasts, and health
Joy of a nation that remains, and life!
My Lord, indeed the sun in its glory is a female, and all the good-natured are girls.

Her family affectionately nicknamed her "Atty". Fathia was homeschooled in the royal palace. Her Arabic language instruction was overseen by Ahmed Youssef. Her studies included music, painting, and athletics. She developed a particular interest in the visual arts, including photography.

In 1935, Princess Fathia's financial allowance was set at 1,200 Egyptian pounds per year. This amount increased to E£4,800 in 1936, where it remained until allowances were discontinued in 1949. By 1949, Fathia owned an estate of 4,959 acres of agricultural land. Notably, in 1945, at the age of 15, she donated E£2,500 to a university residential complex.

== Marriage ==
During her stay in France, Princess Fathia met Riyad Ghali, an Egyptian Coptic Christian diplomat, born in Asyut in 1918. Ghali had previously served in the Ministry of Foreign Affairs, working in the Belgian Congo, London, and Marseilles, before being appointed to assist Queen Nazli during her medical stay abroad. Despite opposition from King Farouk–who objected due to social and religious differences—Fathia and Ghali pursued a relationship. King Farouk offered Ghali an ambassadorship in Latin America to abandon the marriage proposal, but Ghali declined.

The couple was married in a civil ceremony in San Francisco on April 25, 1950, officiated by Judge Goodell, Presiding Justice of the California District Court of Appeal. Following Ghali's conversion to Islam, a religious ceremony took place on May 25, 1950, officiated by a Pakistani Islamic scholar, Sheikh Bashir Ahmad. For her wedding, Fathia wore an ivory satin gown designed by Coco Chanel. The marriage caused a major political and public scandal in Egypt, drawing severe opposition from King Farouk. On May 16, 1950 (decreed publicly on July 26, 1950), the Royal Council stripped Fathia and Queen Nazli of their royal titles, confiscated their assets in Egypt, and revoked their Egyptian citizenship.

In response to the loss of her titles and wealth, Fathia stated to the press that she desired a simple life as a homemaker with the man she loved, noting that losing her royal status allowed her to focus on her marriage. She also defended Ghali against accusations of fortune-hunting, clarifying that he relied on his salary as Queen Nazli's political advisor. Following the revocation of their citizenship, Fathia and her mother resided in the United States under temporary residency status.

The couple had three children: Rafik (29, 1952 – July 12, 1987), Rayed (May 20, 1954 – July 26, 2007) and Rania (April 21, 1956 – June 11, 2025).

== Later life ==
Riyad Ghali managed the family's finances under a general power of attorney granted by Queen Nazli. Ghali lost their combined fortune–estimated at around two million dollars—through high-risk stock market investments and gambling debts in Las Vegas.

As debt mounted, the family's assets were seized and liquidated at public auctions, including their Beverly Hills residence, jewelry, and a home in Hawaii. The financial crisis led to personal strain within the family. Fathia separated from Riyad Ghali in 1965, and later filed for divorce in 1973. Without a formal university degree, Fathia took up work as a custodian to support her family and her ailing mother, Queen Nazli.

In 1974, she attended an Egyptian National Day celebration hosted by the Egyptian consulate in San Francisco. The following year, through the assistance of scholar Dr. Louis Awad and Consul General Dr. Abdel Hadi Makhlouf, Fathia and her family obtained Egyptian travel documents. In 1976, President Anwar Sadat offered the family permission to return to Egypt along with state pensions, and Fathia booked return travel for January 1977.

In September 1976, she appeared in a press interview with Los Angeles Times in which she expressed her plans to return to Egypt. When the interviewer asked her about the rumor that twenty thousand dollars had been spent on one of the parties, she responded:

I lived like any other Egyptian woman who leaves broader responsibilities to her husband, contenting herself with caring for her family and her ailing mother. As for the talk of raucous parties and a lavish lifestyle, there is absolutely no truth to it; it was nothing more than malicious gossip intended to portray us in an unflattering light.

== Death ==
On December 10, 1976, shortly before her scheduled return to Egypt, Fathia visited Ghali at his apartment on Barry Avenue in West Los Angeles. During the visit, Ghali shot Fathia six times, causing her death. Her funeral was attended by her three children, her mother Queen Nazli, and her sister Princess Faiza. she was buried at Holy Cross Cemetery in Culver City, California.

== Ancestry ==
Ancestors of Princess Fathia of Egypt

8. Ibrahim Pasha, Wāli of Egypt
4. Isma'il Pasha, Khedive of Egypt
9. Hoshiar Walda
2. Fuad I, King of Egypt
5. Ferial Hanem
1. Fathia Ghali
6. Abdel Rahim Sabri Pasha, Governor of Cairo
3. Nazli Sabri
14. Muhammad Sharif Pasha, Prime Minister of Egypt
7. Tewfika Hanim
15. Nazli Hanim

== Sources ==
- El-Sharkawy, Eman (2024). صاحبات السمو الملكي [Her Royal Highnesses] (in Arabic). Al-Riwaq Publishing and Distribution. ISBN 978-977-824-225-6.
- Mustafa, Tawfik, Ashraf (2000). فاروق الأول .. والأخير: هوانم القصر الملكي (in Arabic). مركز الراية للنشر والإعلام،. ISBN 978-977-5967-10-7.
- Muhammad, Salam (2006). مشاهير السياسة ج1: موسوعة الاعلام المصرية خلال العصر الحديث والمعاصر (in Arabic). مركز اسكندرية للكتاب. ISBN 978-977-388-050-7.
- Hussein, Marwa Ali (2015). نساء الأسرة العلوية ودورهن في المجتمع المصري [Women of the Alawite family and their role in Egyptian society] (in Arabic). دار الشروق. ISBN 978-977-09-3351-0.
- Morsi, Ismail (2025). فاروق الأول: سيرة الملك [Farouk I: Biography of the King] (in Arabic). Dar Oktob for Publishing and Distribution.
- Fawzi, Mahmoud (1997). فاروق [Farouk]. حكام مصر (in Arabic). Al-Raya Center for Publishing and Media.
- Hashem, Farouk; Abou-Sabe', Morad (2014). Farida, the Queen of Egypt: A Memoir of Love and Governance. AuthorHouse. ISBN 978-1-4918-7174-4.
- "EGYPT: The Locomotive". Time. Vol. 58. Time Incorporated. 1951.
- El-Asfouri, Sherif (2019). مسبار الخلود [The Probe of Eternity] (in Arabic). Mahrousa Center for Publishing, Press Services and Information. ISBN 978-977-313-793-9.
- Kamel, Rashad (1998). الملكة نازلى: غرام وانتقام [Queen Nazli: Love and Revenge] (in Arabic). Dar al-Muntada. ISBN 978-977-19-7292-1.
- Sallam, Hilmi (1991). فاروق: نهاية ملك [Farouk: End of a King] (in Arabic). Dar al-Hilal. ISBN 978-977-07-0059-4.
- Dar El Fikr (2018). حدث في مثل هذا اليوم: الجزء الثاني [Happened on This Day: Volume 2] (in Arabic). Dar El Fikr for Printing, Publishing and Distribution.
- 'Arif, Jamil (2006). من سرق مجوهرات أسرة محمد علي [Who Stole the Jewelry of the Muhammad Ali Family?] (in Arabic). Cairo: Al-Maktab al-Misri al-Hadith.
- Thabit, Yaser (2009). جرائم العاطفة في مصر النازفة [Crimes of Passion in Bleeding Egypt] (in Arabic). Beirut: Arab Scientific Publishers. ISBN 978-9953-87-761-7.
