= Saeed Bey Zaghloul =

Egyptian judge (1880–1923)

Saeed Bey Zaghlol (Arabic: سعيد بك زغلول; 10 April 1890 – 10 July 1923) was an Egyptian judge and the nephew of nationalist leader Saad Zaghloul. He played an important role in the 1919 Egyptian revolution.

== Early life and education ==
Saeed Zaghlol and his sister, Rateeba, were orphaned when Saeed was about three or four years old. They were initially cared for by their maternal grandmother, Maryam Baraka. When Baraka moved to Cairo to live with Saad Zaghloul in the Al-Zahir district, she took the two children with her. Saad and his wife, Safiya Zaghloul, subsequently raised the siblings and taught them to read and write.

Rateeba later became the mother of journalists Mustafa Amin and Ali Amin, who were twin brothers. Saeed later travelled to Paris to study law.

== Career ==
After completing his legal studies, Saeed Zaghlol was appointed an assistant public prosecutor. He subsequently served in the Sultanic Cabinet before returning to the Public Prosecution. He was later appointed a judge at the Zagazig Court.

During the reign of Sultan Hussein Kamel, Zaghlol served as Master of ceremonies at the royal palace. Following the accession of Sultan Fuad in 1917, he requested a transfer from the palace to another government position. According to Mustafa Amin, Fuad offered him the choice of remaining at the palace on a monthly salary of £40 or accepting a lower-ranking position at the Ministry of Justice for £25. Zaghlol chose the latter.

== Role in the 1919 Revolution ==
During the 1919 Egyptian revolution, Saeed Zaghlol was involved in the transmission of instructions from his uncle, Saad Zaghloul, who had been exiled to Gibraltar. According to Mustafa Amin, Saad's instructions were transmitted through intermediaries to members of the nationalist movement. Saeed, who was then serving as a judge, was one of the intermediaries identified by Amin.

Amin stated that Saeed received coded messages in his judicial chambers, deciphered them and transcribed their contents according to a system established by Saad. He then passed the messages through a designated channel to the underground nationalist network. Amin attributed Saeed's involvement partly to his close relationship with Saad, who had raised him after the death of his parents.

== Relationship with Nazli Sabri ==
Saeed had been romantically attached to Nazli and his sister, Rateeba, tried to facilitate a marriage between them. Saad Zaghloul approached Nazli's father, Abdel Rahim Pasha Sabri, regarding a proposed marriage between Saeed and Nazli.

Nazli initially resisted Fuad's proposal while Saeed sought to advance his own proposed marriage to her. Fuad's marriage to Nazli was eventually arranged, and they married in 1919.

== Death ==
While Saad Zaghloul was in exile in Gibraltar, Saeed joined him there and later accompanied him on his travels in Europe. He subsequently contracted an illness and died on 10 July 1923. His remains were transported from Europe to Egypt.

The Egyptian poet Ahmed Shawqi composed an elegy in mourning for Saeed and addressed it to the Zaghlol family.

O family of Zaghloul, let the example of death in the Prophet and his family be consolation enough for you.

Fate came suddenly, and I gathered up my verses from its sudden blows and the swiftness of its improvisation.

Rise, and behold, if you are able to stand, the grief of poetry and the anguish of its imagination.

The poet Hafez Ibrahim also composed an elegy for Saeed Zaghlol, which he recited at his graveside.

== Sources ==
- Amin, Muṣṭafá (1981). من عشرة لعشرين [From Ten to Twenty] (in Arabic). Al-Maktab al-Misri al-Hadith. ISBN 978-977-732-339-0.
- Kamel, Rashad (1997). الهانم والزعيم: الحب والثورة: مشوار حياة سعد زغلول وأم المصريين [The Hanem and the Leader: Love and Revolution: The Life Journey of Saad Zaghloul and the Mother of the Egyptians] (in Arabic). Dar Nasr.
- Rashed, Rawiya (2008). نازلي ..ملكة في المنفى [Nazli: Queen in Exile] (in Arabic). Jeddah: Dar al-Iman. ISBN 978-977-17-5407-7.
- Muti'i, Lam'i (1997). موسوعة هذا الرجل من مصر [Encyclopedia of This Man from Egypt] (in Arabic). Dar al-Shorouk. ISBN 978-977-09-0291-2.
- Amin, Ahmad; al-Zayn, Ahmad; al-Ibyari, Ibrahim (2018). ديوان حافظ إبراهيم [The Collected Works of Hafez Ibrahim] (in Arabic). Vol. 2. Arab Press Agency.
- Mahallawi, Hanafi (1993). حريم ملوك مصر من محمد على الى فاروق [The Harem of the Kings of Egypt from Muhammad Ali to Farouk] (in Arabic). Dar al-Amin for Printing, Publishing and Distribution. ISBN 978-977-5424-44-0.
- Amin, Muṣṭafá (1974). الكتاب الممنوع: أسرار ثورة 1919 [The Forbidden Book: Secrets of the 1919 Revolution] (in Arabic). Dar al-Ma'arif.
- Mustafa, Tawfik Ashraf (2018). نساء الملك فاروق: العرش الذي أضاعه الهوى [The Women of King Farouk: The Throne Lost to Passion] (in Arabic). Arab Press Agency.
- Mustafa, Tawfik Ashraf (2000). حريم في حياة الزعيم سعد زغلول: الثورة التي أيدها الحرملك [The Women in the Life of Leader Saad Zaghloul: The Revolution Supported by the Harem] (in Arabic). Al-Raya Center for Publishing and Media. ISBN 978-977-5967-13-8.
- Abd al-Rahman al-Rafi'i (1968). ثورة 1919: تاريخ مصر القومي من سنة 1914 إلى سنة 1921 [The 1919 Revolution: The National History of Egypt from 1914 to 1921] (in Arabic). Dar al-Sha'b Foundation.
- Amin, Muṣṭafá (1977). من واحد لعشرة [From One to Ten] (in Arabic). Al-Maktaba al-Misriyya al-Haditha. ISBN 978-977-704-905-4.
- Amin, Muṣṭafá (1987). أسماء لا .. [Names That Do Not ..] (in Arabic). Al-Asr al-Hadith.
- Shawqi, Ahmed (2022). الشوقيات [Al-Shawqiyyat] (in Arabic). Hindawi Foundation. ISBN 978-1-5273-0431-4.
- Ibrahim, Hafez (1948). ديوان حافظ إبراهيم [The Collected Works of Hafez Ibrahim] (in Arabic).
