= Shubra (administrative region) =

Neighborhood in Cairo, Egypt

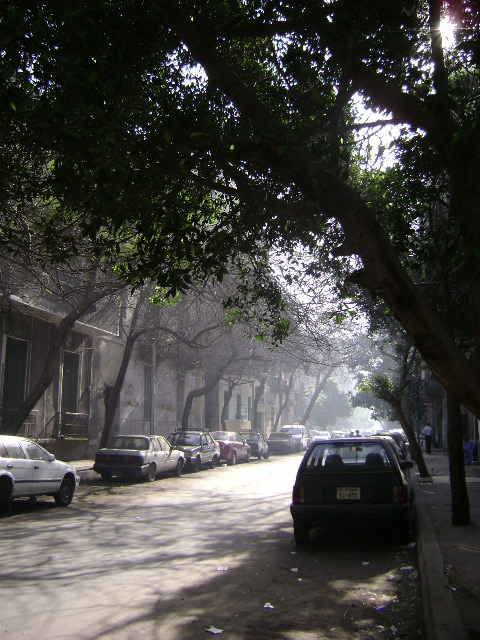

Shubra (or Shobra, Shoubra) is an administrative region and forms a relatively small area that represents about one quarter of the district with the same name in Cairo, Egypt.

It neighbours the areas of Elsahel to the north, Sharabeya to the east, Road El Farag to the west, and Shobra tunnel and Cairo central railway station to the south, the latter of which separate Shobra from the Downtown Cairo area.

== Notable residents ==
- In the 1940s and 1950s Nazir Gayyed (before becoming Pope Shenouda III of Alexandria in 1971) was very active in his church and served as a Sunday School teacher, at Saint Anthony Church in Shobra.
- Bishop Youssef (the first Bishop of the Coptic Orthodox Diocese of the Southern United States) also served at Saint Anthony Church in Shobra.
- Bishop Moussa (the first Bishop of youth) used to also serve in Shobra, before being a monk.
- Diplomat Riyad Ghali was born here (1919-1987), and married princess Fathia Ghali in 1950.
- Father Mikhail Ibrahim also served in Saint Mark Church in Shobra.
- Egyptian-Italian-French singer Dalida was born here in 1933.
