= Hussein Sabri Pasha =

Governor of Alexandria, Egypt

Hussein Sabri حسين صبري
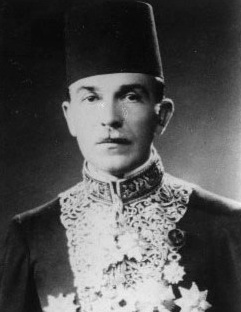
- Spouse: Shahira al-Daramali
- Parents: Abdel Rahim Sabri (father); Tawfika Khanum Sherif (mother)

Hussein Sabri Pasha (Arabic: حسين صبري باشا) was an Egyptian politician who served as the governor of Alexandria from 1925 until 1937 and was the brother of Queen Nazli.

== Biography ==
His father was Abdel Rahim Sabri Pasha, Minister of Agriculture and Governor of Cairo, and his mother was Tawfika Khanum Sharif, daughter of Mohamed Sherif Pasha.

Hussein Sabri served as Governor of Alexandria from 18 March 1925 until 10 January 1937. He was the second president of Egyptian Football association in 1928 until 1937. During this period, the Egyptian football team participated in the World Cup in Italy in 1934, and in the Berlin Olympics in Germany in 1936. He was the third president of the Egyptian Olympic Club in Alexandria (1930–1936). He chose a group of excellent players to join the club, and they were able to obtain the Farouk Cup (Egypt Cup) twice in 1933–1934. He became the president of Alexandria Sporting Club from 1952 until 1955.

His wife was Shahira al-Daramali, and their daughter Nazly Hanim Sabri married Omar Chirine Bey, cousin of Ismail Chirine.

During one of Hussein Sabri's visits to his sister Queen Nazli, She told him that she was afraid of the bad influence that the courtiers around her son Farouk I, could have on him, and that they might turn him against Wafd Party. Nazli asked her brother, who had relations with leaders of Wafd Party, to tell them on her behalf, to take care of Farouk and keep the old courtiers away from him.

Hussein Sabri told his friend, Abdel Hamid Al-Bannan, about his sister's request. Subsequently, Abdel Hamid informed Ahmed Maher and Mustafa el-Nahas Pasha about Queen Nazli's request. However the Wafd Party didn't respond to Queen Nazli's request and made no changes.

== See also ==
- Muhammad Ali Dynasty
- Sherif Sabri Pasha
