= Chirine =

Chirine is a given name and a surname.

Notable people with the given name include:

- Chirine Knaidil (born 1994), Moroccan footballer
- Chirine Lamti (born 1994), Tunisian footballer
- Chirine Njeim (born 1984), Lebanese alpine skier and long-distance runner

Notable people with the surname include:

- Fawzia Fuad Chirine (1921–2013), Egyptian princess
- Ismail Chirine (1919–1994), Egyptian diplomat
