= Shahnaz Pahlavi =

Iranian princess (born 1940)

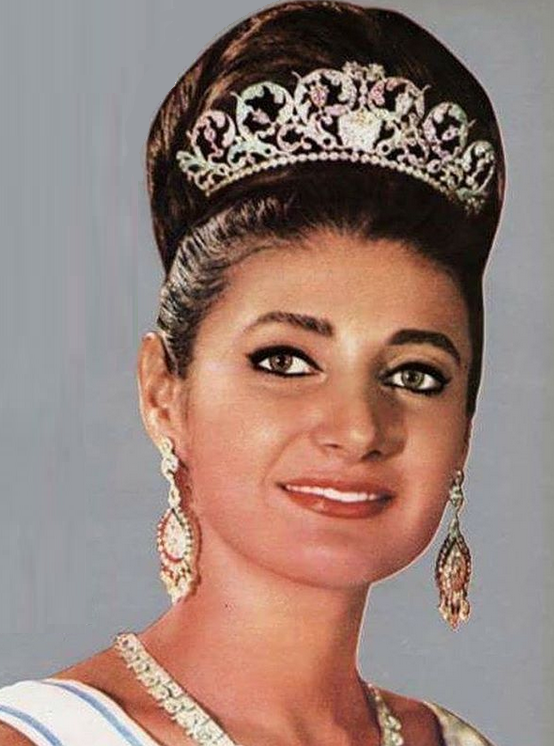
- Shahnaz in 1967
- Born: 27 October 1940 (age 85); Tehran, Imperial State of Iran
- Spouse: Ardeshir Zahedi (m. 1957; div. 1964); Khosrow Jahanbani (m. 1971; died 2014)
- Issue: Zahra Mahnaz Zahedi; Keykhosrow Jahanbani; Fawzia Jahanbani
- House: Pahlavi
- Father: Mohammad Reza Pahlavi
- Mother: Fawzia of Egypt

Shahnaz Pahlavi (Persian: شهناز پهلوی; born 27 October 1940) is the first child of the former Shah of Iran, Mohammad Reza Pahlavi, and his first wife, Fawzia of Egypt.

== Early life and education ==
Shahnaz Pahlavi was born in Tehran, Iran, on 27 October 1940, a year before the accession of her father to the throne. She is the only child of Mohammad Reza Pahlavi and his first wife Queen Fawzia. Her parents separated when she was five years old, with her remaining in Iran with her father, and divorced when she was eight years old,

Shahnaz is the paternal half-sister of Crown Prince Reza Pahlavi, Princess Farahnaz Pahlavi, Prince Ali Reza Pahlavi and Princess Leila Pahlavi — the four children of the Shah by his third wife, Farah Pahlavi. Her maternal grandparents were King Fuad I and Queen Nazli of Egypt; and her paternal grandparents were Reza Shah and Queen Tadj ol-Molouk of Iran. She is also the niece of King Farouk I of Egypt and thus a cousin of the last Egyptian king, Fuad II.

Shahnaz Pahlavi was educated in a Belgian boarding school, the Lycée Léonie de Waha in Liège, Belgium, and then in Switzerland.

== Personal life ==
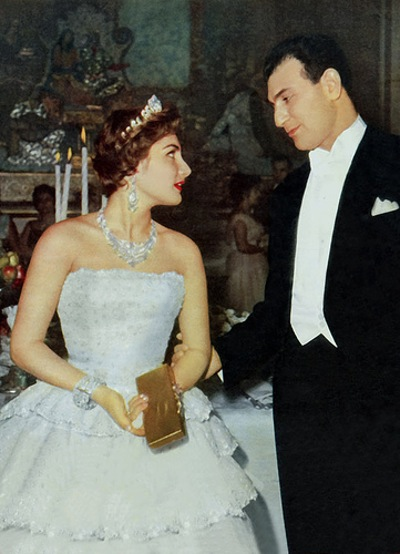
Princess Shahnaz and Ardeshir Zahedi on their wedding day, 1957

Her father had plans for Shahnaz's marriage with King Faisal II of Iraq, which did not materialise due to her unwillingness.

Her first marriage, at age 16, was to Ardeshir Zahedi on 11 October 1957, at Golestan Palace, Tehran. He was one-time Iranian foreign minister and twice Iranian ambassador to the United States (1957–64 and 1972–79). She and Zahedi first met in Germany in 1955. The couple have one daughter. They divorced in 1964.

Shahnaz later married Khosrow Jahanbani, the son of Iranian general Amanullah Jahanbani, in February 1971 at the Iranian embassy in Paris. Their marriage lasted until Jahanbani's death on 13 April 2014.

During her father's reign, Shahnaz had investments in agricultural enterprises and assembly plants of a joint venture with Honda bicycles and motorcycles in Iran.

== Later years ==
Since the 1979 Iranian Revolution, Shahnaz Pahlavi has lived in Switzerland. She has Swiss citizenship. In December 2013, she was granted Egyptian citizenship by the Egyptian government.

== Honours ==
- Imperial Iran: Grand Cross of the Order of Aryamehr
- Imperial Iran: Grand Cross of the Order of the Pleiades, 1st class
- Imperial Iran: 25th Anniversary medal
- Imperial Iran: 2,500-year celebration of the Persian Empire

== Gallery ==
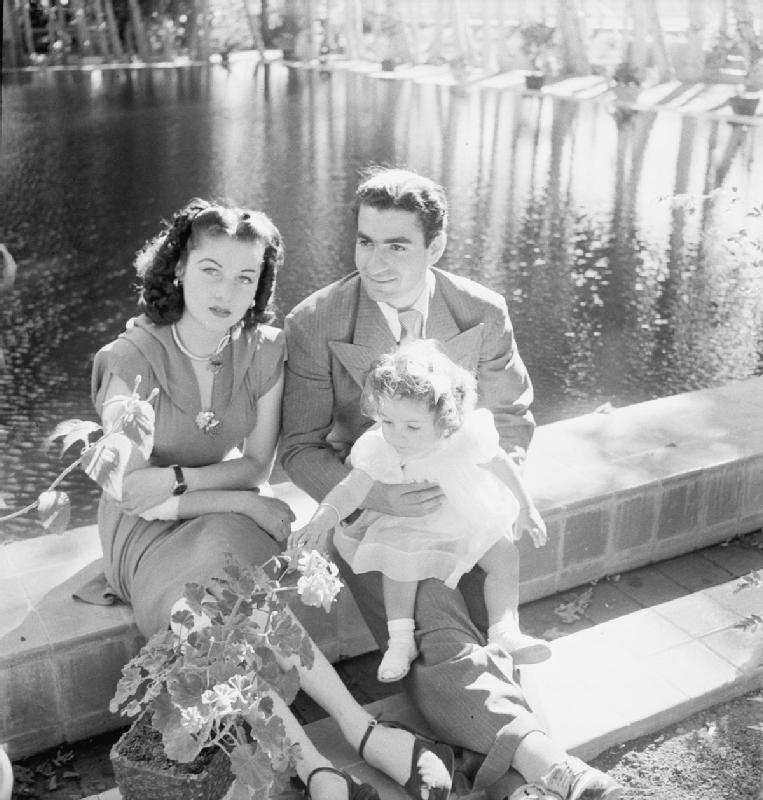
Princess Shahnaz with her father Mohammed Reza Pahlavi and her mother Queen Fawzia. Photo by Cecil Beaton.

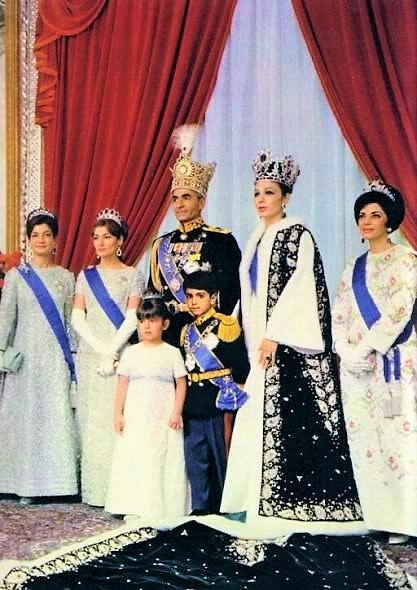
Princess Shahnaz (second from left) at the coronation of Mohammad Reza Pahlavi in 1967

== See also ==
- List of Iranian women royalty
