= Nazli Sabri =

Sultana/Queen of Egypt from 1919 to 1936

Nazli Sabri نازلي صبري
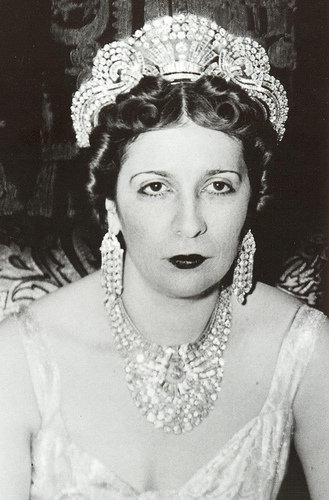
- Queen Nazli in 1922

Queen consort of Egypt
- Tenure: 15 March 1922 – 28 April 1936

Sultana of Egypt
- Tenure: 26 May 1919 – 15 March 1922
- Born: 25 June 1894; Alexandria, Khedivate of Egypt
- Died: 29 May 1978 (aged 83); Los Angeles, California, U.S.
- Burial: Holy Cross Cemetery, Culver City, California, United States
- Spouses: Khalil Sabri (m. 1918; div. 1918) Fuad I of Egypt (m. 1919; died 1936)
- Issue: Farouk I of Egypt; Fawzia, Queen of Iran; Princess Faiza; Princess Faika; Princess Fathia
Names
- Mary Elizabeth Sabri, previously Nazli Abdelrehim Sabri
- House: Alawiyya (by marriage)
- Father: Abdel Rahim Sabri Pasha
- Mother: Tawfika Sharif Hanim
- Religion: Sunni Islam (1894–1950); Catholic (1950–1978)

Nazli Sabri (Arabic: نازلي صبري; 25 June 1894 – 29 May 1978) was the first queen consort in the Kingdom of Egypt from 1919 to 1936. She was the second wife of King Fuad I.

== Early life ==
Nazli was born on 25 June 1894 to an Egyptian father and a mother of Turkish, French and Greek origin.

Her father was Abdel Rahim Sabri Pasha, Minister of Agriculture and Governor of Cairo. Her mother, Tawfika Sharif Hanim, was the daughter of Major General Mohamed Sherif Pasha.

Nazli had two brothers: Sherif Sabri Pasha and Hussein Sabri Pasha, and two sisters: Amina Sabri and Nawal Sabri.

Nazli first went to the Lycée de la Esclave-de-Dieu in Cairo, and later attended Collège Notre-Dame de Sion in Alexandria. Following the death of her mother, she and her sister were sent to a boarding school in Paris for two years.

After returning, Nazli was forced to marry her cousin, Khalil Sabri. However, the marriage ended in divorce after eleven months. After the separation, she stayed at the house of Safiya Zaghloul, where she met Zaghloul's nephew Saeed Zaghloul; the two were engaged until Saeed broke up with her during his exile with his uncle Saad Zaghloul following the 1919 revolution.

== Queen ==
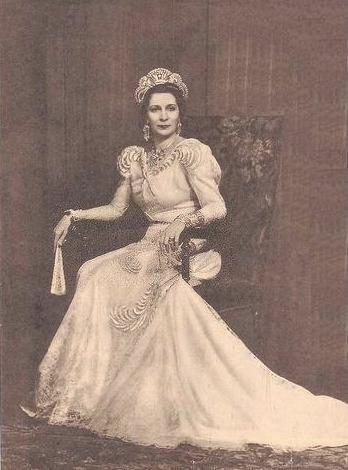
Official birthday portrait in 1925

The Sultan of Egypt, Fuad I, first saw Nazli at an opera performance. On 12 May 1919, Fuad proposed to her, although he was 26 years her senior. On 24 May 1919 Nazli married Sultan Fuad I at Bustan Palace, Cairo. It was the second marriage for both Nazli and Fuad. She later moved to the haramlek in the Abbasiya Palace. She was under pressure from her husband to produce a son, and was warned that she would be confined to the haremlek if she did not do so.

After the birth of their only son, Farouk, Nazli was allowed to move into Koubbeh Palace, the official royal residence, with her husband. When Fuad's title was altered to King, she was given the title of Queen. She then had four daughters: Fawzia, Faiza, Faika, and Fathia.

Restricted to the palace throughout most of Fuad's reign, Nazli was permitted to attend opera performances, flower shows, and other ladies-only cultural events. As her upbringing had left her remarkably educated, cultured and emancipated for an Egyptian woman of the time, she found this prescribed existence backward and stifling.

Nazli accompanied the king during part of his four-month tour of Europe in 1927, and was much fêted in France because of her French ancestry. With the inauguration of Parliament in 1924, she was among the royal attendees at the opening ceremony, seated in a special section of the guest gallery.

== Later years ==
Following the death of King Fuad in 1936, Nazli's son Farouk became the new King of Egypt, and she became the queen mother. Her brother Sherif Sabri Pasha served on the three-member Regency Council that was formed during Farouk's minority. In 1946, Nazli left Egypt and went to the United States for treatment for a kidney ailment.

On 13 September 1950 King Farouk deprived the Queen Mother, and her daughter Princess Fathia of their rights and titles. This was due to latter's marriage, which Nazli supported, but was against Farouk's wishes, to Riyad Ghali Effendi, a Coptic Christian. Nazli later converted to Catholicism, changing her name to Mary-Elizabeth.

In 1955 Nazli purchased, for $63,000, a 28-room mansion in Beverley Hills, where she lived with Fathia, her son-in-law, and their two children, and led an active social life.

In 1965, Nazli attended the funeral of Farouk, in Rome.

Following Fathia's divorce, Nazli moved to a small apartment in Westwood, Los Angeles, where Fathia eventually joined her after temporarily moving to Hawaii.

To meet debt demands, in 1975 Nazli sent her principal jewellery to auction at Sotheby's, including a magnificent art deco tiara (720 diamonds weighing 274 carats) and matching necklace commissioned in 1938 from Van Cleef & Arpels. They sold for $127,500 and $140,000 respectively. However, Nazli and Fathia still ended up in bankruptcy court. In 1978, Fathia's jewellery was also sold to meet debts.

In 1976, Egyptian president Anwar Sadat sent a proposal to Queen Nazli and Princess Fathia that passports would be provided to both women to give them right of return to Egypt. Eventually Nazli settled in the US, due to her painful illness. She died on 29 May 1978 at the age of 83 in Los Angeles, California.

== Legacy ==
Queen Nazli's art deco necklace reappeared at a Sotheby's sale in December 2015. The Queen ordered the Van Cleef & Arpels necklace along with a matching tiara for her daughter's (Fawzia) wedding. The necklace is formed by 600 round and baguette diamonds arranged in a sunburst motif.

== Titles and styles ==
- 26 May 1919 – 15 March 1922: Her Gloriness The Sultana
- 15 March 1922 – 18 January 1938: Her Majesty The Queen
- 18 January 1938 – 8 August 1950: Her Majesty Queen Nazli

== In popular culture ==
In 2007, Queen Nazli was played by Egyptian actress Wafaa Amer in the Drama "El-malek Farouk".

In 2008, Rawia Rashed published a book about Queen Nazli, titled Nazli, Malika Fi El Manfa (Nazli, A Queen in Exile). Based on this book, an Egyptian TV series provided an account for the life of Queen Nazli, Queen in Exile, starring Egyptian actress Nadia Al-Gindi in 2010. She was also portrayed by Nelly Karim in the 2025 Egyptian film El Sett, a biopic about the life and career of the iconic Egyptian singer and actress Umm Kulthum.

== See also ==
- List of consorts of the Muhammad Ali Dynasty
- History of Egypt under the Muhammad Ali dynasty

== Bibliography ==
- Montgomery-Massingberd, Hugh, ed. (1980). "The Royal House of Egypt". Burke's Royal Families of the World. Vol. II: Africa & the Middle East. London: Burke's Peerage. pp. 20–37. ISBN 978-0-85011-029-6. OCLC 18496936.

Egyptian royalty
Vacant Title last held by Melek Tourhan	Sultana of Egypt; 1919–1922	Became Queen
New title Kingdom of Egypt established	Queen consort of Egypt; 1922–1936	Vacant Title next held by Farida
