= Bulent Rauf =

Turkish-British mystic translator and author (1911–1987)

- Born: 1911
- Died: 1987 (aged 75–76)
- Spouse: Princess Faiza of Egypt (m. 1945; div. 1962)

Bulent Rauf (Istanbul 1911 – Chisholme House, Roberton, Scottish Borders 1987) was a Turkish-British mystic, spiritual teacher, translator and author. From 1945 to the early sixties, he was married to Princess Faiza, sister of King Farouk of Egypt.

Bulent Rauf dedicated many years of his life to teaching the Islamic concept of "the one Absolute Unity of all existence" (tawhid). Among other things, the British mystic and author Reshad Feild, who portrayed him as "Hamid" in his well-known book The Last Barrier, considered him to be his 'teacher'. However, Bulent Rauf himself emphasized the Islamic view that Muhammad was the final prophet, and that each person is taught directly by their own life with no intermediary. Rauf's chief literary work was the complete rendering into English of Ibn 'Arabi's Fusûs al-Hikam (The Bezels of Wisdom), incorporating the four volume Ottoman commentary attributed to Ismail Hakki Bursevi.

Bulent Rauf was instrumental in founding the Beshara School for Esoteric Education in Scotland in 1975, which has been attended by hundreds of students from all over the world. He lived at Chisholme and Turkey from 1975 until his death and was a consultant to the school throughout that period.

Bulent Rauf was the first president of the Muhyiddin Ibn Arabi Society, which is dedicated to making known the work of the Sufi mystic Ibn Arabi, and encouraged translation and publication of his writings. Rauf led the society until his death in 1987.

The 2012 documentary In Search of Oil and Sand tells the story of Bulent Rauf's creation of the amateur movie Oil and Sand, together with members of the Egyptian royal family and their friends, in the weeks leading up to the Egyptian Revolution of 1952.

== Published works ==
- Addresses ISBN 0-904975-12-6
- Addresses II ISBN 0-904975-30-4
- Ismail Hakki Bursevi's Translation of and Commentary on Fusus al-Hikam by Muhyiddin Ibn 'Arabi Four volumes (ISBN 0-9509527-1-0 etc.)
- The Kernel of the Kernel ISBN 0-904975-08-8
- The Last Sultans ISBN 0-9525173-0-2
