= Muhyiddin Ibn Arabi Society =

Foundation dedicated to studying Ibn Arabi

The Muhyiddin Ibn Arabi Society (MIAS) is a research foundation dedicated to studying the works of Medieval Andalusian philosopher Ibn Arabi. MIAS publishes its own academic journal twice a year, and it has branches in Australia, Spain, the United Kingdom, and the United States. It's registered as a charitable incorporated organisation in the UK, where one of its two headquarters is found at Oxford, and as a tax-exempt nonprofit corporation in the US, where its other headquarters is found at the Berkeley.

== History ==
MIAS was founded between 1976 and 1977 to promote the study of Ibn Arabi's works. Having developed among the same community members as the spiritual organization Beshara, the original intention was that MIAS would focus on the academic side of those works while Beshara would focus on the direct spiritual experiences. Bulent Rauf's efforts were integral to the establishment of both organizations, and he was also the first president of MIAS.

The biannual publication of its academic journal began in 1982.

Every year, the organization holds a symposium on the works of Ibn Arabi, starting with their first in Durham in 1984. In 2015, on the 850th anniversary of Ibn Arabi's birthday, the Spanish branch of MIAS held the seventh international symposium on Ibn Arabi's works in Murcia, with further symposiums being held in Oxford and at Columbia University in New York City.

== Reception ==
British historian of Islam Mark Sedgwick noted MIAS as a significant and visible overlap between academia and Western Sufism, and Macalester College professor G.A. Lipton noted the organization's "enormous intellectual impact" through research published by top scholars in the field.

Although MIAS attempted to digitize their archive of manuscripts on Ibn Arabi's works, the organization didn't adhere to the ISAD(G), resulting in a diminished profile for the project.
