= Ismail Chirine =

Egyptian royal diplomat

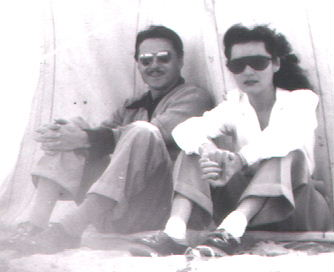
- Chirine with his wife Fawzia in 1949
- Born: 17 October 1919; Alexandria, Sultanate of Egypt
- Died: 14 June 1994 (aged 74); Alexandria, Egypt
- Burial: Cairo, Egypt
- Spouse: Princess Fawzia (m. 1949)
- Issue: Nadia Chirine; Hussein Chirine
Names
- Ismail Hussein Chirine Bey
- House: Muhammad Ali Dynasty
- Father: Hussein Chirine
- Mother: Amina Bahrouz Fadel
- Religion: Islam
- Military career
- Allegiance: Kingdom of Egypt
- Branch: Army
- Service years: 1939–1952
- Rank: Colonel; Honorary Field Marshal
- Unit: Cavalry
- Conflicts: World War II; 1948 Arab–Israeli War

Ismail Hussein Chirine (Arabic: إسماعيل شيرين; 17 October 1919 – 14 June 1994) was an Egyptian royal diplomat. He served very briefly as Egypt's Minister of War in July 1952. His mother, Princess Amina Bahruz Fazil, was a member of the Muhammad Ali dynasty.

== Early life and education ==
Chirine was born in Alexandria on 17 October 1919 to Hussein Chirine Pasha (died 1934) and Princess Amineh Bahrouz Fazil (1886–1947), a member of a cadet branch of the Egyptian royal family. After their divorce, his mother married Ali Rateb, from Alexandria, and his father married Gulsun Hanem Aflaton. His uncle and guardian was the governor of Cairo. From the age of 12, Chirine preferred to live with his aunt Zeinab Chirine, wife of Haidar Pasha.

He was educated at Victoria College in Alexandria, Great Chesterfield College and Trinity College, Cambridge.

== Career ==
Chirine assumed different public posts in Egypt. When Chirine returned from the United Kingdom he firstly worked for the Bank El Ahly El Masry. Later he became an officer in the army, where his proficiency in the English language was useful during negotiations in the 1948 Arab–Israeli War, together with Rahmani Bey who later became ambassador to Czechoslovakia. Chirine became colonel in the army. He was a member of Egypt's delegation to the 1949 Armistice Agreements in Rhodes. In 1948, he served as secretary of Egyptian delegation to the United Nations. Then he acted as aide-de-camp of King Farouk. In 1949 he served as the press officer for the cabinet. He was appointed Defense Minister of during the reign of King Farouk, Chirine was the last Defense Minister of Kingdom of Egypt. In 1940s Chirine became the first to hold the position of Vice President of Zamalek SC.

== Personal life ==
Chirine married Princess Fawzia, the sister of King Farouk, in March 1949, five months after the Princess's divorce from the Shah of Iran. The wedding ceremony was held in Koubba Palace. Following the wedding they lived in an estate owned by the Princess in Maadi. They also resided in a villa in Smouha.

They had two children, Nadia (19 December 1950 – October 2009) and Hussein (born 1955 – died 2016). Their daughter, Nadia, married firstly Egyptian actor Yusuf Shabaan and secondly Mustafa Rashid.

He lived the rest of his life in Alexandria, tending his property in the South of Egypt and spending summers in Switzerland, to allow his wife to meet her eldest daughter, Princess Shahnaz Pahlavi.

== Death ==
Chirine died at the military hospital in Alexandria on 14 June 1994 at the age of 74. He was buried in Cairo.
