= Riyad Ghali =

Egyptian diplomat (1919–1978)

Riyad Bishay Ghali (11 February 1919 – 12 July 1987) was the husband of Fathia Ghali the youngest daughter of King Fuad I and Nazli Sabri.

== Marriage, divorce and death ==
While in the United States, Riad Ghali married Princess Fathia in May 1950 against the will of King Farouk I. His father, Bishay Ghali, was killed on 5 January 1953 (reference Almasry Alyoum). The marriage produced three children:

- Rafik Ghali (29 November 1952)
- Rayed Ghali (born 20 May 1954)
- Ranya Ghali (born 21 April 1956)

Following family and financial problems due to bad investment, the marriage ended in 1973. On 10 December 1976, Riyad Ghali shot and killed his ex-wife and he unsuccessfully tried to commit suicide. He died on 12 July 1987.
