= Ras El Tin Palace =

Building in Alexandria, Egypt

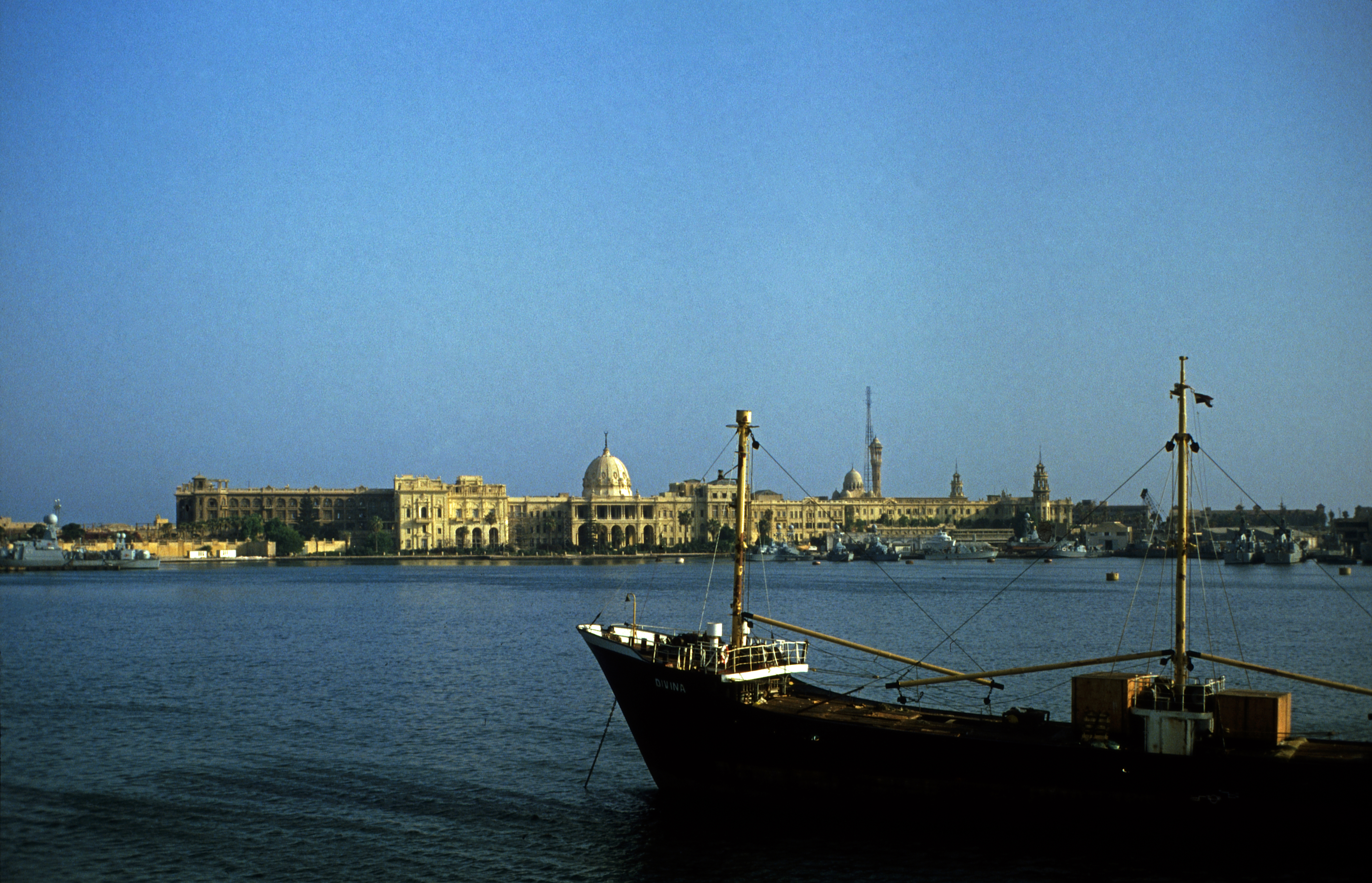
- The palace seen from the Port of Alexandria, 1983

- Location within Egypt

General information
- Type: Palace
- Architectural style: Italian Renaissance
- Location: Alexandria, Egypt
- Coordinates: 31°11′57″N 29°52′07″E
- Current tenants: President of Egypt
- Construction started: 1834
- Completed: 1847
- Client: Muhammad Ali Pasha

Technical details
- Floor area: 17,000 m^{2} (180,000 sq ft)

Design and construction
- Architect: Ernesto Verrucci-Bey

Ras El Tin Palace (Arabic: قصر راس التين, romanized: Qaṣr Ras El Tīn, literally, "Cape Fig Palace") is a palace on the coast of the Mediterranean Sea in Alexandria, Egypt. It is located in the Ras el-Tin quarter on Alexandria's eastern shore, overlooking the city's Western Harbour.

The promontory on which it is built was in antiquity the site of the island of Pharos. Under the Muhammad Ali Dynasty of Egypt and Sudan it was a royal palace, and it is the oldest royal Egyptian palace still in use. It was registered on the list of Islamic and Coptic antiquities in 2015 and now serves as one of the official residences for a serving President of Egypt.

== History ==
The palace has a long historical association with Egyptian royalty, being connected with the Muhammad Ali dynasty during the 19th and 20th centuries. Muhammad Ali Pasha (r. 1805–1848) initially ordered that the palace be built in the form of a fortress based on the shape of a Roman fort. It was intended as a secondary fort to complement the Cairo Citadel. The style initially chosen was that of traditional Ottoman architecture, but as the project progressed the palace began to develop European features under the influence of the Italian architect Pietro Avoscani, such as his design for the entrance gate with its coat of arms. A number of other foreign architects and engineers were also commissioned by Muhammad Ali for the design and construction of the palace.

Construction started in 1834 and was completed to the original design in 1845. Alterations and the construction of additional wings continued until it was finished in 1847. Built in the style of a grand château, it was used as the official summer residence for the Egyptian monarch and government, during the season when Alexandria became Egypt's working capital. It was one of a number of construction developments in Alexandria initiated by Muhammad Ali to serve as a vice-regal palace. It is said by tradition to be the site of negotiations between Muhammad Ali and Admiral Sir Charles Napier during the Oriental Crisis of 1840.

During the reign of Khedive Ismail it became the summer vacation home of the rulers of the Muhammad Ali family. They constructed a private railway line between the palace and Cairo with a railway station inside the palace. The palace was also given a classical portico. In 1879, Khedive Ismail was forced to leave Egypt from the palace.

During the Anglo-Egyptian War of 1882, a British naval landing party led by Captain Jacky Fisher was quartered in the palace. A seaplane base was established next to the palace during the period of British rule in Egypt as part of the British naval base at Alexandria. During World War II, the palace was used as a headquarters and hospital for the British Naval Command.

Following the Egyptian Revolution of 1952 the penultimate monarch of Egypt and Sudan, King Farouk, sought refuge in the palace where he was besieged by Egyptian Army forces. Farouk signed his abdication in the palace and departed from it to leave Egypt and go into exile. The palace was subsequently nationalized, as were the other former royal palaces in the country. It was used as a presidential residence and for hosting state guests.

== Style ==
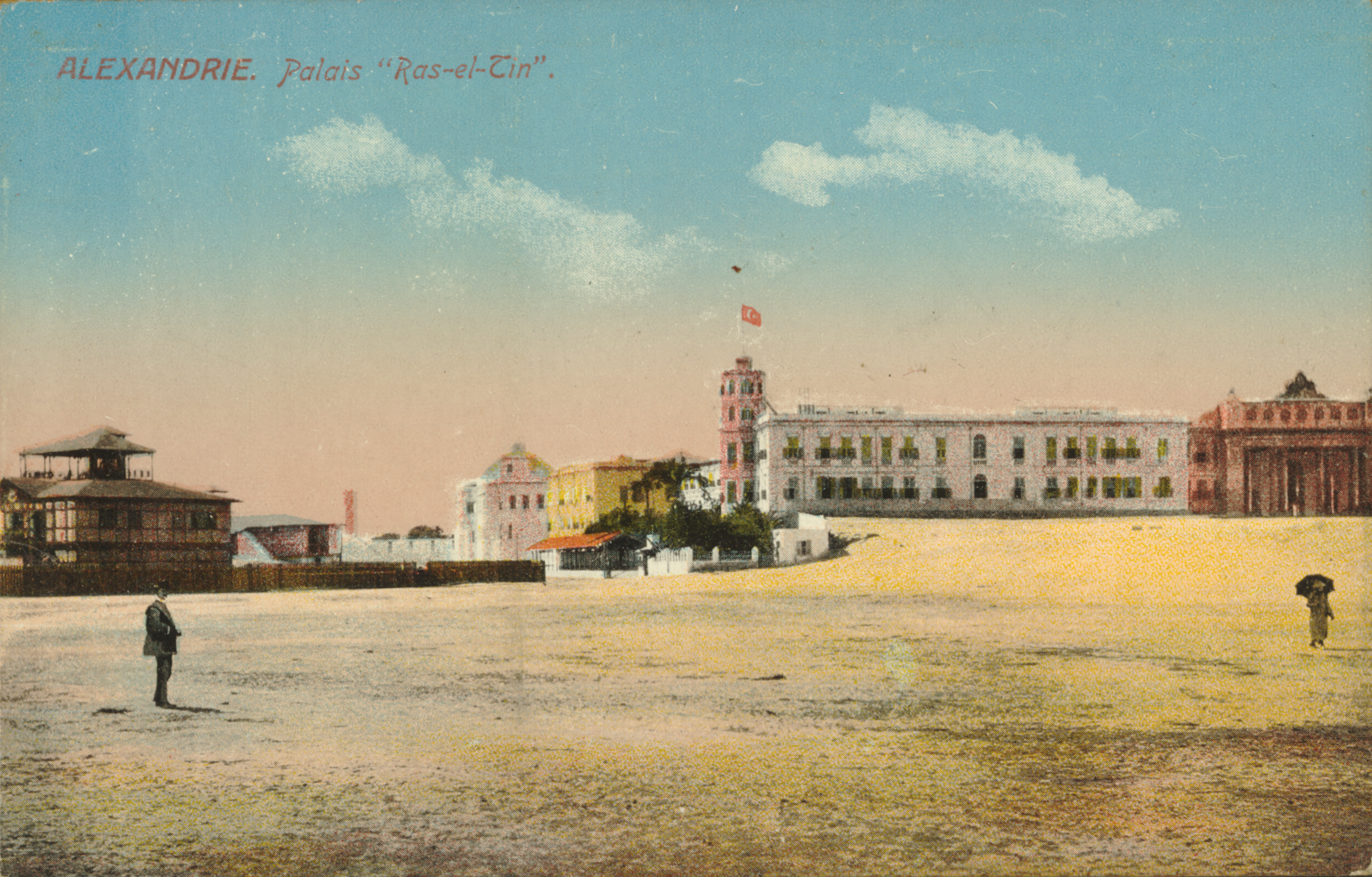
Ras El Tin Palace on a postcard

Ras El Tin Palace has the shape of a large Italian Renaissance palace, with architectural elements and ornamentation inspired by that era, along with Baroque and Moorish elements. It was erected on a foundation of 17,000 square metres (4.2 acres), surrounded by elaborate gardens of 12 feddans (13 acres). Fig trees (Arabic – teen) were already on the palace site, inspiring its name Ras Al-Teen. Through the reign of successive kings the complex was used as their residence and the government headquarters during the summer season.

Various rulers made changes to the palace. It was totally reconstructed by Fuad I in the 1920s, with modern services and redecoration making it similar to the opulent Abdeen Palace (built 1863), the larger royal complex in central Cairo. The interior décor combined Renaissance elements with Byzantine, French and Modern. The redesign and construction was overseen by the Italian engineer Ernesto Verrucci Bey. It became a three-storey building and a mosque was built on the site. The palace included a swimming pool with a large attached glass pavilion hall. Much of the opulent furniture during this redecoration was supplied by the Parisian ébéniste, François Linke, on a scale not seen since Versailles 200 years earlier. At one end of the building was the harem, but this had become disused.

King Farouk added the Princesses Building to the palace. After the Second World War, he had a marine pool built on the Mediterranean breakwater. The pool was linked to Ras Al-Teen with a narrow and long paved lane atop the breakwater, with a jeep used to pass through waves breaking over it. The adjacent pool house included a sitting room, bed chamber, fully equipped small kitchen, and rooms for staff and storing recreation and fishing gear.

== Current usage ==
The formal garden is open to the public, but not the palace itself. A naval base is located next to the palace. The palace now serves as a presidential residence and hosts state guests and events. There is no public museum, unlike the Montaza Palace royal gardens and museum, also in Alexandria.

== See also ==
- List of palaces in Egypt
- Royal Jewelry Museum – Fatma Al-Zahra Palace (Alexandria)
