= Koubbeh Palace =

Egyptian palace near downtown Cairo

Coordinates: 30.0987°N 31.303°E

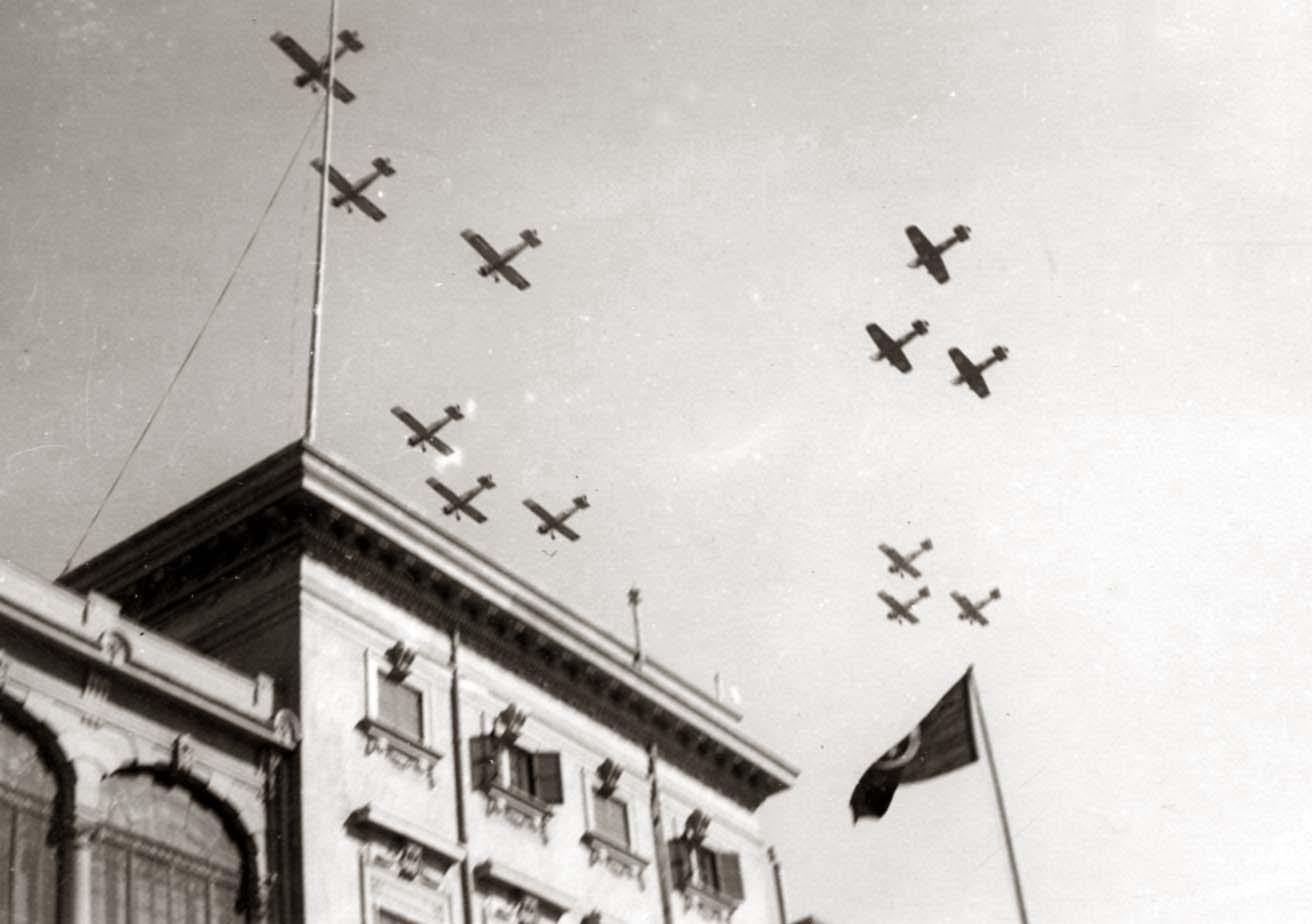
- Egyptian aircraft flying over Koubbeh Palace to celebrate the royal wedding of King Farouk and Queen Farida
- Interactive map of the Koubbeh Palace area
- Alternative names: Qasr Al Qubbah

General information
- Status: Active
- Location: Cairo, Egypt, Egypt
- Current tenants: President of Egypt
- Construction started: 1867
- Completed: 1872
- Inaugurated: 1873
- Client: Ismail of Egypt
- Owner: Egyptian Government

Technical details
- Material: Reinforced concrete

Koubbeh Palace or Qubbah Palace (Arabic قصر القبة) is one of the various Egyptian palaces which serve as the country's official guest house for visiting dignitaries.

The palace was most likely originally built in the mid-19th century and sold to Khedive Ismail in 1866 by his brother Mustafa Fazl Pasha.

== Under the Monarchy ==
Under Khedive Tewfik, Koubbeh Palace was a venue for One Thousand And One Night celebrations, royal weddings, and a place where visiting dignitaries admired magnificent gardens. During his son's rule (Khedive Abbas II; r. 1892-1914) the garden palace gradually came to be regarded as complementary to Cairo's Abdin Palace in terms of officialdom.

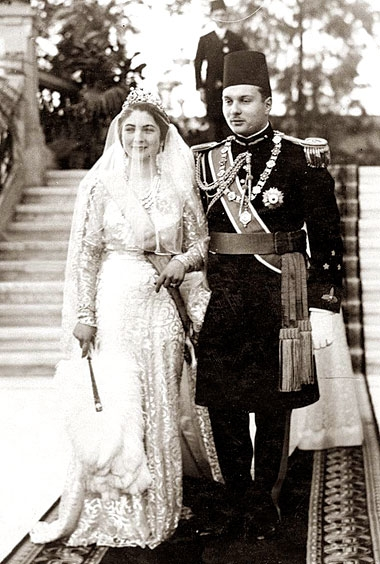
Queen Farida and King Farouk's wedding in the palace, 1938

When King Fouad I ascended Egypt's throne in 1917, Koubbeh became the official royal residence. During his reign, King Fouad ordered enhancements and extensions to Koubbeh, including a six-meter wall around the 75-acre (300,000 m^{2}), a new gate and an external garden. In addition, a royal train station was added to the palace complex where visiting dignitaries arrived by special carriage directly from Alexandria or from Cairo's main railway station.

It was at this palace that King Fouad died, and his then 16-year-old son King Farouk greeted his subjects during an inaugural radio broadcast on 8 May 1936. King Farouk kept his personal collections at Koubbeh. These included a stamp collection, an 8,500-piece coin and medals collection, studded clocks and watches, in addition to many other antiquities including a pure gold coffee set and a 1906 Faberge egg that belonged to Tsar Nicholas II. Much of these were auctioned off in 1954.

== The Republic ==
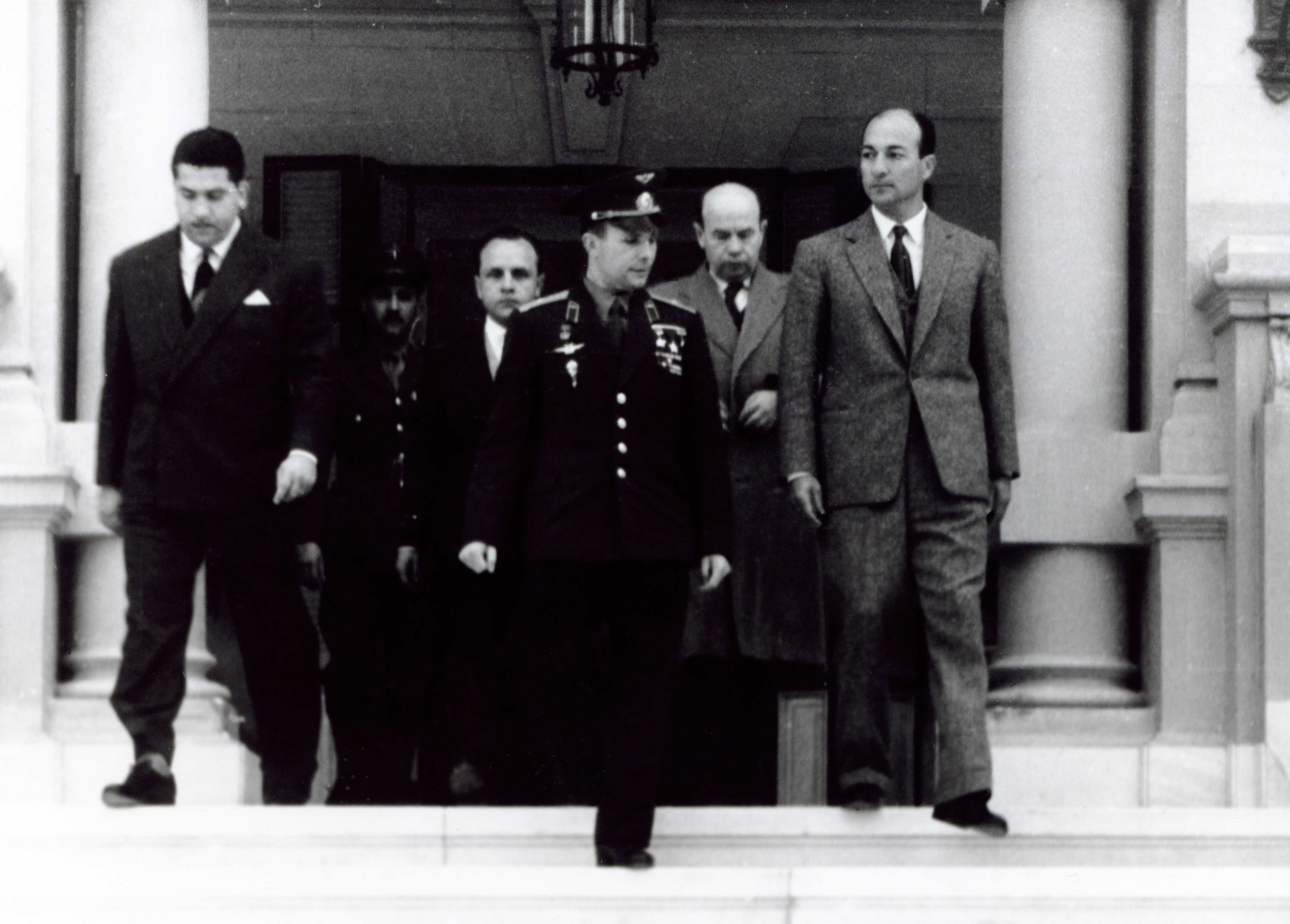
Vice President Zakaria Mohieddin and Yuri Gagarin and in the palace, February 1962

After the 1952 revolution that led to the declaration of the republic, Koubbeh Palace was declared as one of three official presidential palaces, the other two being Abdeen Palace in downtown Cairo and Ras El Tin Palace in Alexandria. It was at Koubbeh that President Gamal Abdel Nasser preferred to host guests. It was also there that his body lay awaiting his funeral in September 1970. The Shah of Iran also lived in this palace when in exile in Egypt. Koubbeh remains Egypt's principal guesthouse. U.S. President Barack Obama was received in it during his visit to Cairo in June 2009.
