= Saffron Palace =

Coordinates: 30.0768°N 31.2844°E

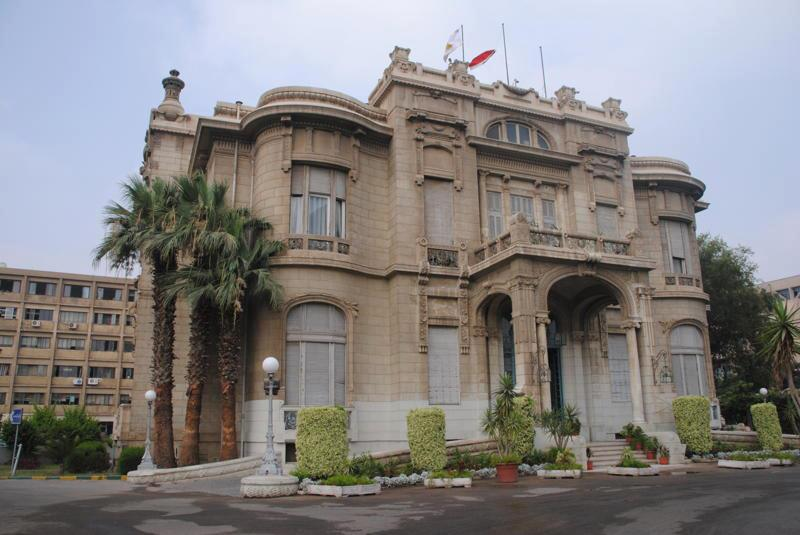
- Interactive map of the Saffron Palace area

General information
- Architectural style: influenced by the Palace of Versailles in France
- Location: Abbassia, Cairo, Egypt
- Construction started: 1864

Design and construction
- Architect: Moghri bey Saad

The Saffron Palace (Arabic: قصر الزعفران) is located in the Egyptian capital of Cairo, near Abbassia at Khalifa Maʽmon Road. Now it is inside the main campus of Ain Shams University.

== History ==
The Saffron Palace was an Egyptian royal palace. Farouk of Egypt is said to have been born in it.

The three-storey palace, designed by the French-educated Egyptian architect Moghri bey Saad, was built during the reign of Isma'il Pasha. It received its name from the saffron plantations which then existed around the palace. The Egyptian University's administrative offices were housed in the palace when it was founded in 1925. Important visitors were also hosted by the ministry of foreign affairs at the palace.

The Anglo-Egyptian treaty of 1936 was signed in the palace and, in March of 1945, the Arab League was founded there.

In 1952, the palace became the administrative headquarters of Ain Shams University, which remains to the present day.

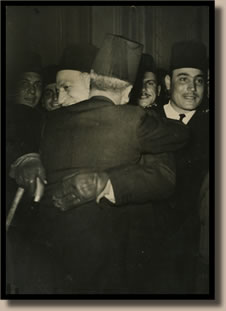
Meeting between Mohamed Ali Eltaher and Mostafa El-Nahas at the palace (1950)

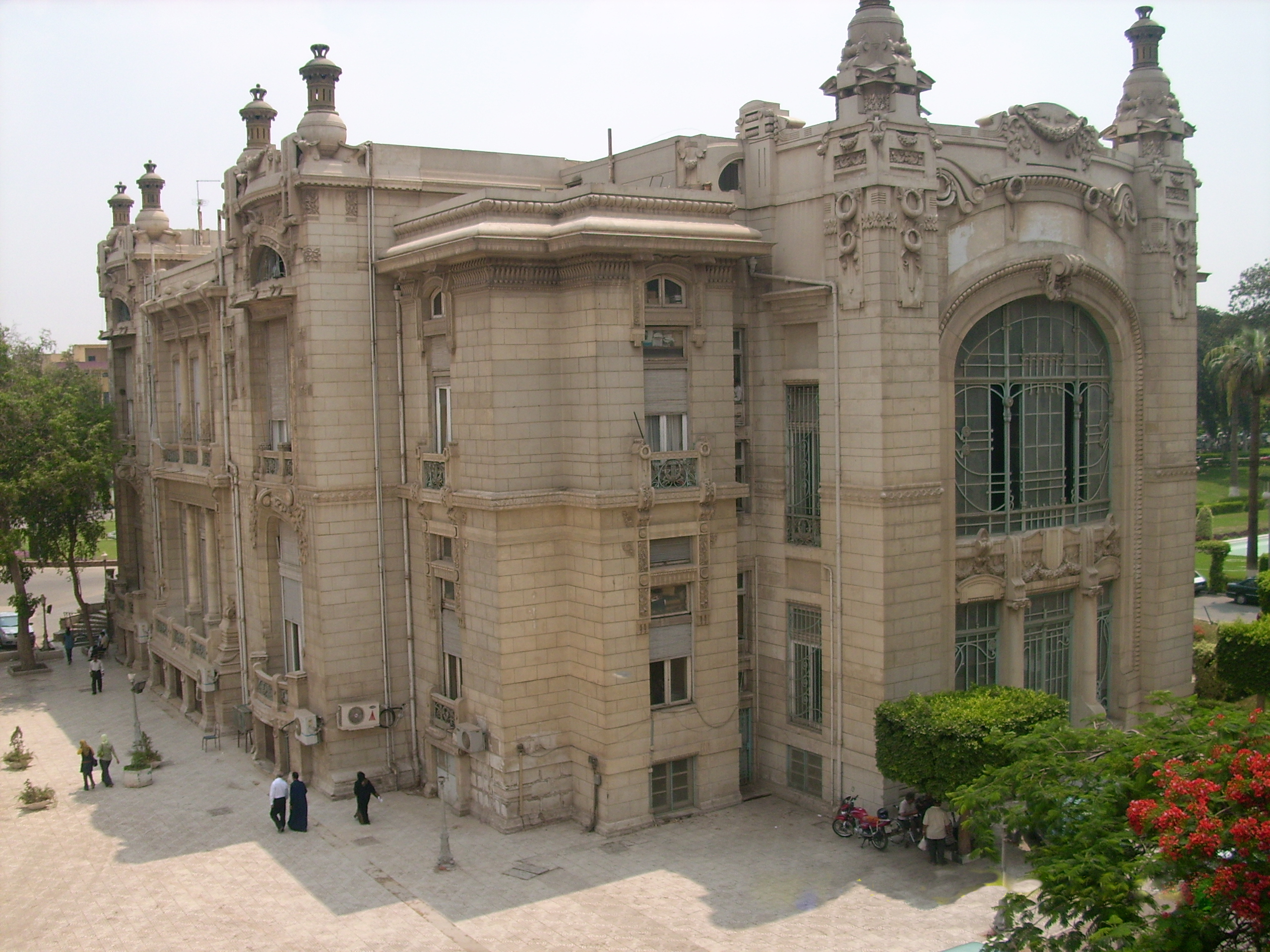

== See also ==
- List of palaces in Egypt
