= Ferial Qadin =

Ottoman Egyptian consort

- Died: 21 February 1902; Saffron Palace, Cairo, Egypt
- Burial: Al-Rifa'i Mosque The Khedival Mausoleum, Cairo, Egypt
- Spouse: Isma'il Pasha
- Issue: Fuad I
Names
- Ottoman Turkish: فَرْیال قادین Feryâl Kadın; Arabic: فَرْيَال قَادِين Faryāl Qādīn
- House: Muhammad Ali (by marriage)
- Religion: Sunni Islam

Ferial Qadin (Ottoman Turkish: فَرْیال قادین Feryâl Kadın; (Note: قادین (kadın) means 'lady' in Ottoman Turkish.) Arabic: فَرْيَال قَادِين, romanized: Faryāl Qādīn; died 21 February 1902) was a consort to Ismail Pasha, and mother to their son Fuad I of Egypt.

== Background ==
She married Ismail Pasha, and gave birth to the future King Fuad I on 26 March 1868 in the Giza Palace. Ismail was deposed in 1879, and was succeeded by his son Tewfik Pasha. She was widowed at Ismail's death in 1895.

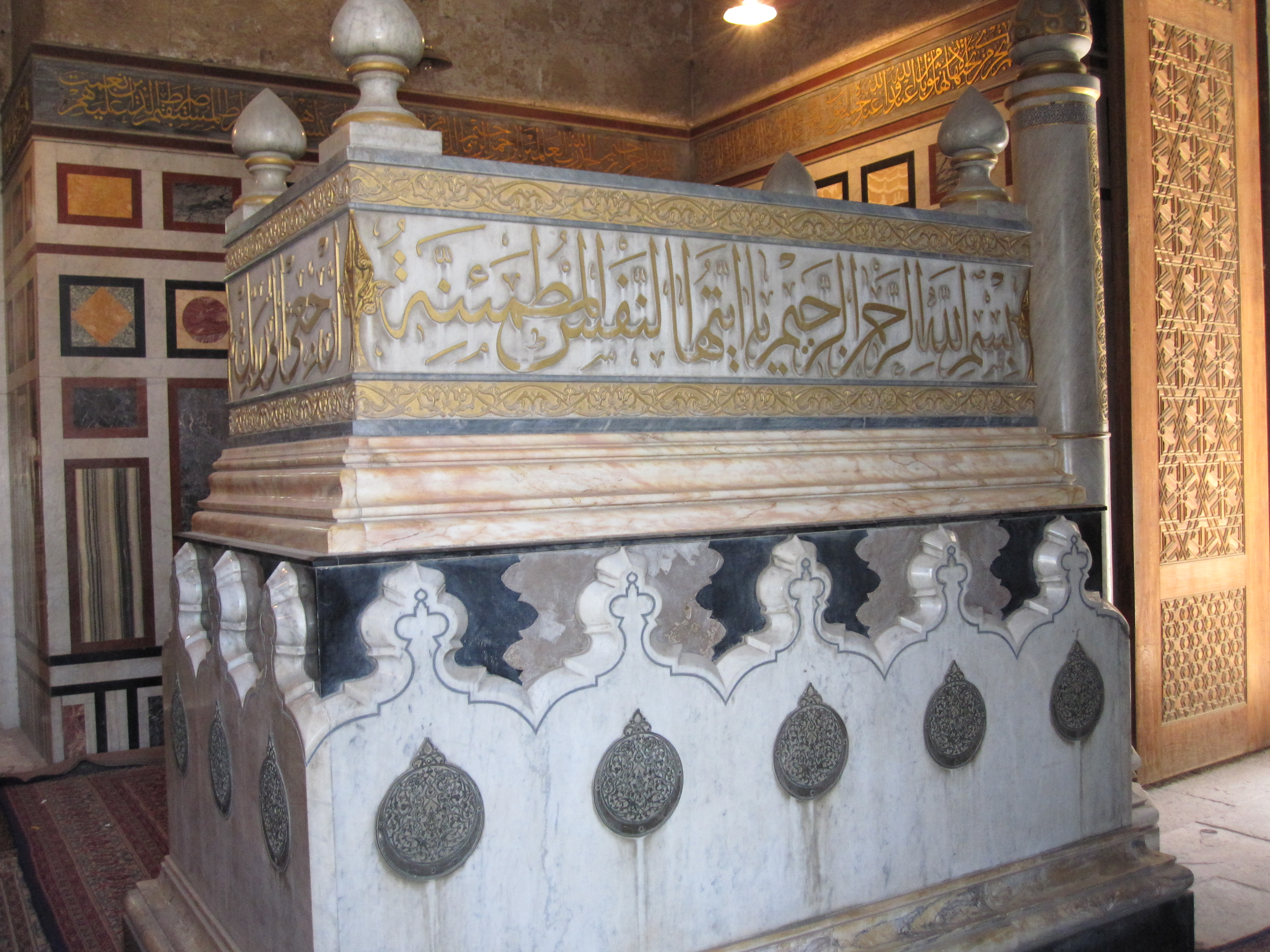
The tomb of Ferial Qadin

She died on 21 February 1902 in the Saffron Palace, Cairo, twenty years before her son Fuad ascended the throne. She was buried in the Khedival Mausoleum located in Al-Rifa'i Mosque, Cairo.

Fuad adored his mother, and believed that "F" was his lucky letter. The names of his five daughters and son Farouk all started with F, and Farouk continued the practice with his own children.

== In popular culture ==
In the 2014 Egyptian historical drama series Saraya Abdeen, Ferial is portrayed by actress Nour.

== See also ==
- Muhammad Ali Dynasty family tree
