= Abdel Rahim Sabri Pasha =

Former Governor of Cairo

Abdel Rahim Sabri Pasha عبد الرحيم صبري باشا
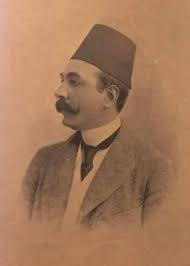

Governor of Monufia
- In office 1913–1917

Governor of Cairo
- In office 24 December 1917 – 2 June 1919
- Preceded by: Ali Zulfakar Pasha
- Succeeded by: Mahmoud Fakhry Pasha

Minister of Agriculture
- In office 23 May 1919 – 20 November 1919
- Prime Minister: Mohamed Said Pasha
- Preceded by: Ahmed Medhat Yeghen Pasha
- Succeeded by: Ahmed Helmy Pasha

Personal details
- Died: 26 August 1930 Alexandria, Egypt
- Spouse: Tawfika Sherif Hanim
- Children: Sherif Sabri Pasha; Nazli Sabri; Hussein Sabri Pasha; Nawal Sabri; Amina Hanim Sabri
- Parent(s): Hussein Sabri (father); Niaz Hanim (mother)

Abdel Rahim Sabri Pasha (died 1930, Arabic: عبد الرحيم صبري باشا) was the governor of Cairo from 1917 until 1919 and served as the minister of Agriculture. He was the father of Queen Nazli.

== Biography ==
His father was Hussein, son of Ibrahim, who served as a governor in multiple regions.

Abdel Rahim Sabri Pasha was part of the Egyptian intelligentsia that traveled to Europe, where he focused his studies on agriculture.

He received the title “Pasha” from Khedive Abbas II.

He was a supporter of Egypt's nationalist Wafd Party, and a close friend of Sa'ad Zaghlol.

He married Tawfika Hanim, daughter of Mohamed Sherif Pasha, Prime-Minister of Egypt, and Nazli Hanim, and had five children with her:

- Amina Abdel Rahim Sabri (1906–1925)
- Sherif Sabri Pasha (b.1895)
- Hussein Sabri Pasha
- Nazli Sabri (1894–1978)
- Nawal Sabri (1899–1905)

The couple moved between Cairo and Alexandria, and eventually moved to a large palace in Dokki. The palace had a large garden, which included a group of beautiful flowers, plants, and trees.

His daughter Nawal, died at the age of 6, and he named the palace where he lived in after her.

Abdel Rahim Sabri Pasha was governor of Menofia from 1913 to 1917. During that time, he built a strong relationship with Prince Fuad (later King Fuad). When Fuad I became the Sultan, Abdel Rahim Sabri served as governor of Cairo from 1917 until 1919. After King Fuad I married Nazli Sabri, he elected Abdel Rahim Sabri as minister of Agriculture in May 1919.

On July 29th of 1919, Fuad bestowed upon him the Order of the Nile, which was presented to him at Ras El Tin Palace.

Abdel Rahim Sabri Pasha was also president of Shura council. He became Minister of Communications in Adly's transition Cabinet. from 4 October 1929 to 31 December 1929.

Abdel Rahim Sabri Pasha died on 26 August 1930 in Alexandria. His funeral was held the following day in Alexandria and then Cairo.

== Legacy ==
One of the streets in Dokki was named after him.

== See also ==
- Sultanate of Egypt
- List of monarchs of the Muhammad Ali dynasty
