= Abdeen Palace =

Historic palace in Cairo, Egypt

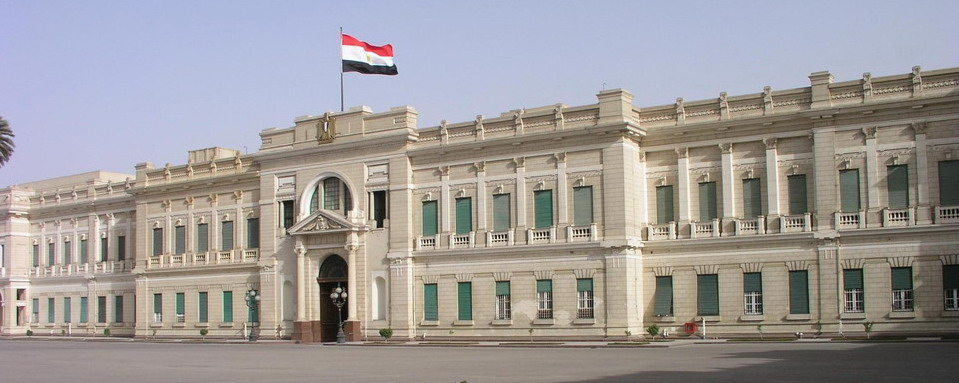
- The main facade of the Palace.

- Location within Egypt

General information
- Location: Abdin Square; Cairo, Egypt
- Coordinates: 30°02′30″N 31°14′54″E
- Construction started: 1863
- Cost: £E2,700,000

Technical details
- Size: 44 feddans

Design and construction
- Architect: French architect Rousseau

Abdeen District is the home of Abdeen Palace, a 19th-century Cairo palace built by Khedive Ismail and served as the Egyptian royal household's primary official residence from 1874 until the 1952 Egyptian revolution. Since then it has been one of the presidential palaces. The palace is centered in its eponymous district, administratively part of the Western Area of Cairo, and part of the Khedival Cairo Area of Value to the west of Historic Cairo.

== Overview ==
Built on the site of a small mansion owned by Abdeen Bey, Abdeen Palace, which is named after him, has adornments, paintings, and a large number of clocks scattered in the parlors and wings, most of which are decorated with pure gold. Built under the rule of Ismail Pasha, to become Egypt's official government headquarters instead of the Citadel of Cairo (which had been the center of Egyptian government since the Middle Ages), this palace was used as well for official events and ceremonies.

The construction started in 1863 and continued for 10 years and the palace was officially inaugurated in 1874. Erected on an area of 24 feddans, the palace was designed by the French architect Léon Rousseau along with a large number of Egyptian, Italian, French and European decorators. A new wing was added by Joseph Urban in 1891. However, the palace's garden was added in 1921 by Sultan Fuad I on an area of 20 feddans. The cost of building the palace reached £E700,000 in addition to £E2 million for its furnishing. Between four palaces, King Fuad spent more than 18 million French francs with just one Parisian furniture manufacturer Linke & Cie. More money was also spent on the palace's alteration, preservation and maintenance by consecutive rulers. The palace has 500 rooms.

== Museum ==
The palace today is a museum, located in the Old Cairo district of Abdeen. The upper floors (the former living quarters of the royal family) are reserved for visiting foreign dignitaries. The lower floors contain the Silver Museum, the Arms Museum, the Royal Family Museum, and the Presidential Gifts Museum. A new museum, the Historical Documents Museum, was opened in January 2005. Among other documents, it contains the Imperial Ottoman firman, or decree, which established the rule of Muhammad Ali and his family, and a certificate for the Order of the Iron Crown, from the short-lived South American Kingdom of Araucanía and Patagonia.

== See also ==
- Abdeen Palace incident of 1942
- List of museums in Egypt
