= Fuad I of Egypt =

Sultan/King of Egypt from 1917 to 1936

Fuad I فؤاد الأول
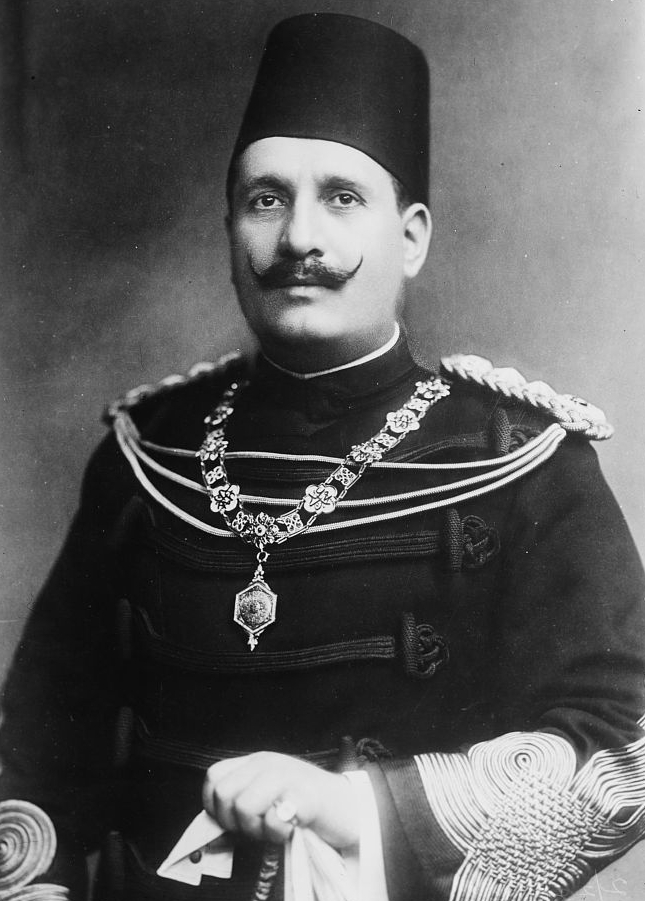
- Official portrait, 1922

King of Egypt
- Reign: 15 March 1922 – 28 April 1936
- Predecessor: Himself as Sultan of Egypt
- Successor: Farouk

Sultan of Egypt
- Reign: 9 October 1917 – 15 March 1922
- Predecessor: Hussein Kamel
- Successor: Himself as King of Egypt
- Born: 26 March 1868; Giza Palace, Cairo, Khedivate of Egypt, Ottoman Empire
- Died: 28 April 1936 (aged 68); Qubbah Palace, Cairo, Kingdom of Egypt
- Burial: Al-Rifa'i Mosque, Cairo, Egypt
- Consort: Shivakiar Ibrahim (m. 1895; div. 1898) Nazli Sabri (m. 1919)
- Issue: Prince Ismail; Princess Fawkia; Farouk, King of Egypt and the Sudan; Fawzia, Queen of Iran; Princess Faiza; Princess Faika; Princess Fathia
Names
- Ahmad Fuad; Arabic: أحمد فؤاد
- House: Alawiyya
- Father: Isma'il I of Egypt
- Mother: Ferial Qadin
- Religion: Sunni Islam

Fuad I (Arabic: فؤاد الأول Fu’ād al-Awwal; 26 March 1868 – 28 April 1936) was the ruler of Egypt from 1917 to 1936. He was the last Sultan and later first King of Egypt. The ninth ruler of Egypt from the Muhammad Ali dynasty, he ascended to the throne in 1917, succeeding his elder brother Hussein Kamel. He replaced the title of Sultan with King when the United Kingdom unilaterally declared Egyptian independence in 1922.

== Early life ==
Fuad was born in Giza Palace in Cairo, the fifth issue of Isma'il Pasha and the youngest son. He spent his childhood with his exiled father in Naples. He was educated at the military academy in Turin, Italy. His mother was Ferial Qadin.

Prior to becoming sultan, Fuad played a major role in the establishment of Egyptian University (now called Cairo University). He became the university's first rector in 1908, and remained in the post until his resignation in 1913. He was succeeded as rector by then-minister of Justice Hussein Rushdi Pasha.

in 1911, following the Italian invasion of Tripoli and Cyrenaica during the Italo-Turkish War, Prince Ahmed Fuad sought to establish himself as the Arab Muslim ruler of Libya under the Italian crown, as the likelihood of Fuad becoming the monarch in his own country seemed remote; however, the Italian government ultimately rejected his proposal, preferring direct colonial administration over a subsidiary monarchy.

In 1913, Azzam Pasha suggested nominating Prince Fuad for the throne of Albania, in response to the desire of Albanian Muslims to have a Muslim king. The European Allied powers chose a German prince instead to rule Albania in March 1914.

Fuad also served as president of the Egyptian Geographic Society from 1915 until 1918.

== Reign ==
He ascended the throne of the Sultanate of Egypt upon the death of his brother Hussein Kamel in 1917. In the aftermath of the Egyptian Revolution of 1919, the United Kingdom ended its protectorate over Egypt, and recognised it as a sovereign state on 28 February 1922. On 15 March 1922, Fuad issued a decree changing his title from Sultan of Egypt to King of Egypt. In 1930, he attempted to strengthen the power of the Crown by abrogating the 1923 Constitution and replacing it with a new constitution that limited the role of parliament to advisory status only. Large scale public dissatisfaction compelled him to restore the earlier constitution in 1935.

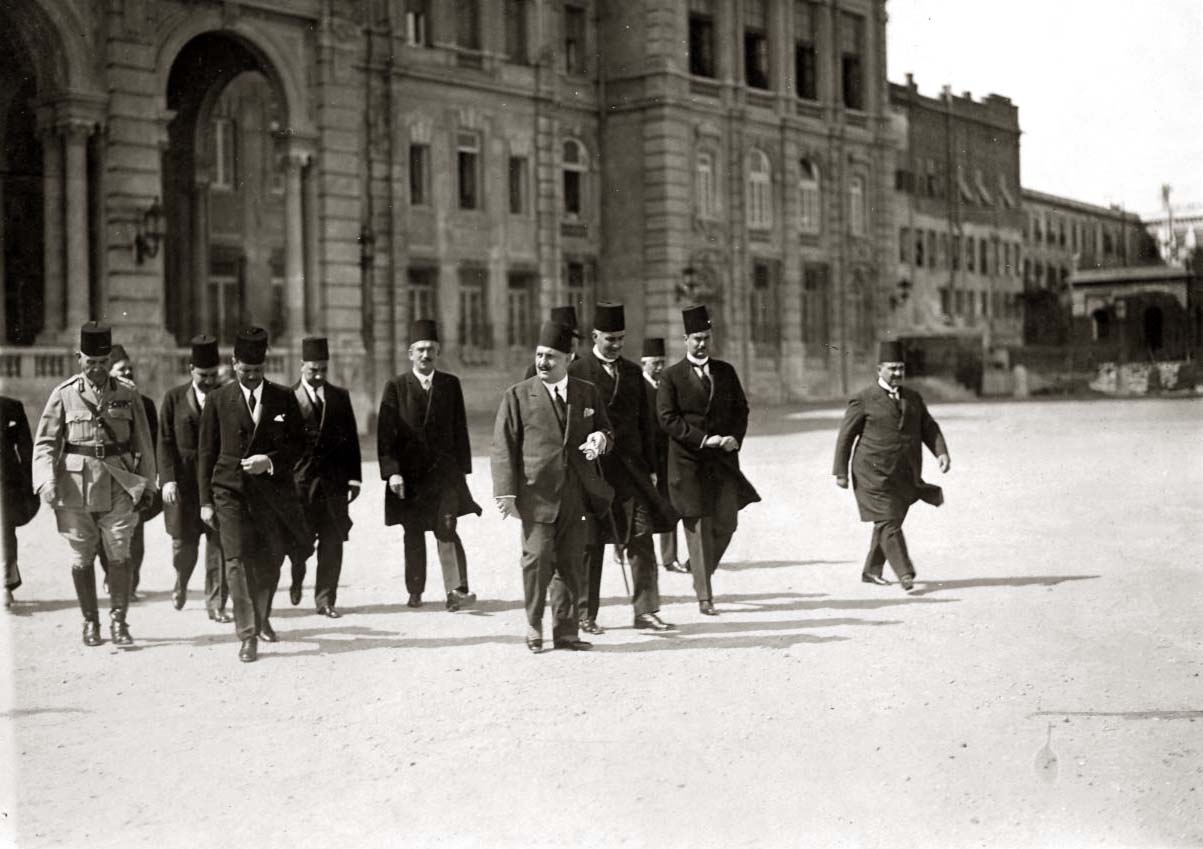
King Fuad with Mohamed Mahmoud Pasha and other ministers outside of Mahatet ar-Raml in Alexandria in the late 1920s

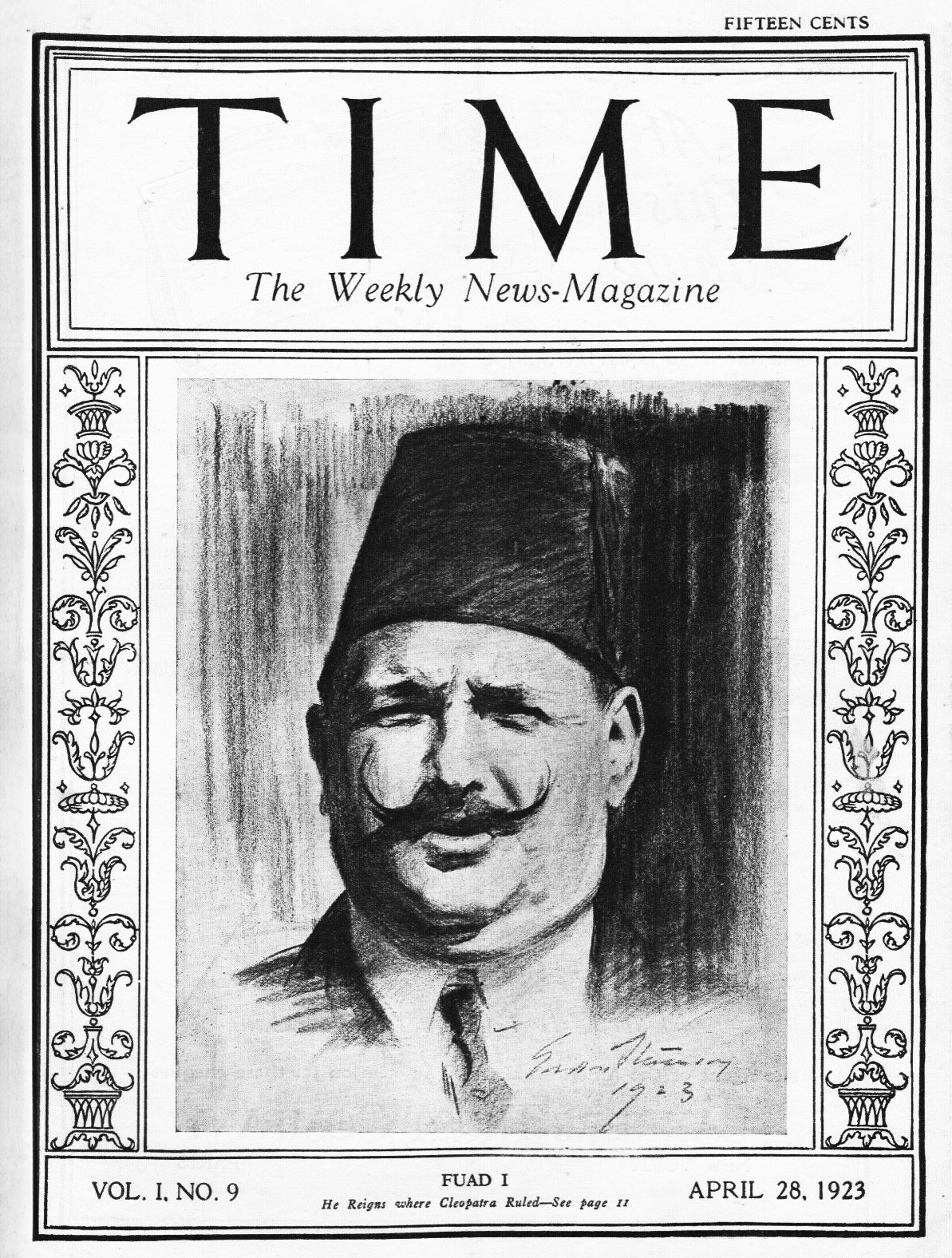
King Fuad I of Egypt on the ninth cover of Time magazine (28 April 1923)

The 1923 Constitution granted Fuad vast powers. He made frequent use of his right to dissolve Parliament. During his reign, cabinets were dismissed at royal will, and parliaments never lasted for their full four-year term but were dissolved by decree.

=== Creation of the Royal Archives ===
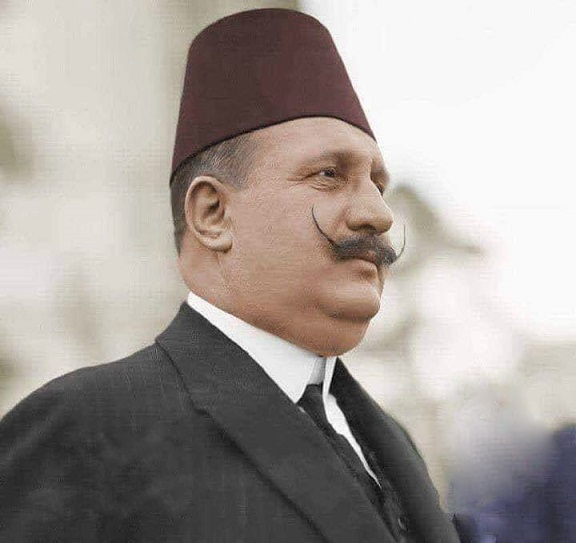
King Fuad I, c. 1934

Fuad was an instrumental force in modern Egyptian historiography. He employed numerous archivists to copy, translate, and arrange eighty-seven volumes of correspondence related to his paternal ancestors from European archives, and later to collect old documents from Egyptian archives into what became the Royal Archives in the 1930s. Fuad's efforts to portray his ancestors – especially his great-grandfather Muhammad Ali, his grandfather Ibrahim, and his father – as nationalists and benevolent monarchs would prove to be an enduring influence on Egyptian historiography.

== Personal life ==
Fuad married his first wife, Princess Shivakiar Khanum Effendi (1876–1947), in Cairo, on 30 May 1895 (nikah), and at the Abbasiya Palace in Cairo, on 14 February 1896 (zifaf). She was his first cousin once removed and the only daughter of Field Marshal Prince Ibrahim Fahmi Ahmad Pasha (his first cousin) by his first wife, Vijdan Navjuvan Khanum. They had two children, a son, Ismail Fuad, who died in infancy, and a daughter, Fawkia. Unhappily married, the couple divorced in 1898. During a dispute with his brother-in-law, the brother of his first wife, Prince Ahmad Saif-uddin Ibrahim Bey, Fuad was shot in the throat. He survived, but carried that scar the rest of his life.

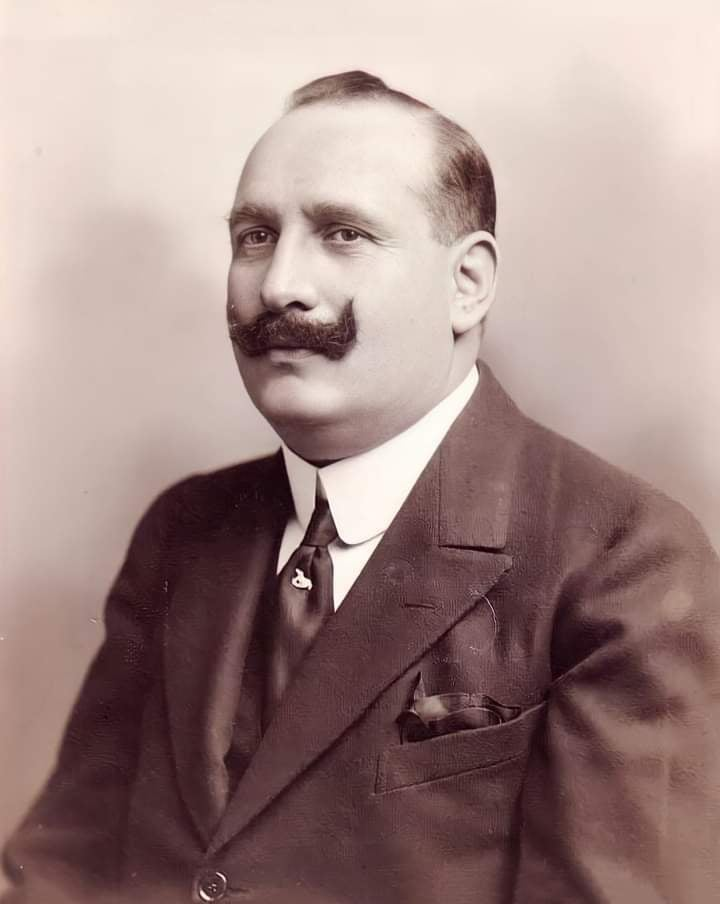
Prince Ahmed Fuad (later Fuad I), c. 1900–1910

Fuad married his second wife at the Bustan Palace in Cairo on 24 May 1919. She was Nazli Sabri (1894–1978), daughter of Abdu'r-Rahim Pasha Sabri, sometime Minister of Agriculture and Governor of Cairo, by his wife, Tawfika Khanum Sharif. Queen Nazli also was a maternal granddaughter of Major-General Muhammad Sharif Pasha, sometime Prime Minister and Minister for Foreign Affairs, and a great-granddaughter of Suleiman Pasha, a French officer in Napoleon's army who converted to Islam and reorganized the Egyptian army. The couple had five children, the future King Farouk, and four daughters, the princesses Fawzia (who became queen consort of Iran), Faiza, Faika, and Fathia.

As with his first wife, Fuad's relation with his second wife was also stormy. The couple continually fought, Fuad even forbidding Nazli from leaving the palace. When Fuad died, it was said that the triumphant Nazli sold all of his clothes to a local used-clothes market in revenge.

King Fuad's wife Nazli lived as a widow after his death. She did not have good relations with her son. After Fuad's death, she left Egypt and went to the United States. She converted to Catholicism in 1950 and changed her name to Mary Elizabeth. She was deprived of her rights and titles in Egypt. Once named the world's richest and most elegant woman, she possessed one of the largest jewellery collections in the world.

== Death ==
Fuad I died on 28 April 1936 at the Koubbeh Palace in Cairo, reportedly of heart failure, at the age of 68. He was buried at the Khedival mausoleum in the al-Rifa'i Mosque in Cairo. He was succeeded by his son, Farouk I, who was 16 years old and studying in England at the time of his father's death.

== Legacy ==
The Fuad (Fū’ād) (فؤاد الأول) Muslim Library in China was named after him by the Chinese Muslim Ma Songting. Muḥammad 'Ibrāhīm Fulayfil (محمد إبراهيم فليفل) and Muḥammad ad-Dālī (محمد الدالي) were ordered to Beijing by the King.

== Titles ==
- 26 March 1868 – 9 October 1917: His Highness Ahmed Fuad Pasha
- 9 October 1917 – 15 March 1922: His Highness The Sultan of Egypt.
- 15 March 1922 – 28 April 1936: His Majesty The King of Egypt.

== Honours ==
Domestic

- Founder and Sovereign of the Order of Agriculture
- Founder and Sovereign of the Order of Culture
- Founder and Sovereign of the Order of Commerce and Industry

Foreign

- Ottoman Empire: Order of the Medjidie, 1st Class, 1893
- Kingdom of Italy: Grand Cross of the Order of Saints Maurice and Lazarus, 1911
- Greece: Grand Cross of the Order of the Redeemer, 1912
- United Kingdom of Great Britain and Ireland: Knight Grand Cross of the Order of the Bath (GCB), 1917
- Qajar Iran: Imperial Order of Persia, 1919
- Portugal: Grand Cross of the Order of the Tower and Sword, 1920
- Sweden: Commander Grand Cross of the Order of Vasa, 1921
- Kingdom of Romania: Grand Cross w/Collar of the Order of Carol I, 1921
- Empire of Japan: Collar of the Order of the Chrysanthemum, 1921
- Kingdom of Italy: Knight of the Order of the Most Holy Annunciation, 1922
- Spain: Collar of the Order of Charles III, 1922
- Kingdom of Hejaz: Grand Cordon of the Order of the Renaissance of the Hejaz, 1922
- Netherlands: Knight Grand Cross of the Order of the Netherlands Lion, 1925
- Kingdom of Afghanistan: Grand Collar of the Order of the Supreme Sun, 1927
- Albanian Kingdom: Grand Collar of the Kingdom of Albania, 1927
- United Kingdom: Royal Victorian Chain (RVC), 1927
- French Third Republic: Grand Cross of the Legion of Honour, 1927
- Belgium: Grand Cordon of the Order of Leopold, 1927
- Syria: Grand Cordon of the Order of the Umayyads, 1927
- Czechoslovakia: Collar of the Order of the White Lion, 1927
- Poland: Grand Cross of the Order of the White Eagle, 1932
- Sweden: Knight of the Royal Order of the Seraphim, 1933
- Thailand: Knight of the Order of the Royal House of Chakri, 1934
- Denmark: Knight of the Order of the Elephant, 1932
- Finland: Grand Cross with Collar of the Order of the White Rose of Finland, 1935
- Iran: Grand Collar of the Order of the Crown, 1935

== See also ==
- Kingdom of Egypt
- List of monarchs of the Muhammad Ali dynasty

Fuad I of Egypt Muhammad Ali dynasty Born: 26 March 1868 Died: 28 April 1936
Regnal titles
Preceded by Hussein Kamel	Sultan of Egypt; 1917–1922	Sultanate becomes independent kingdom
New title Kingdom of Egypt established	King of Egypt; 1922–1936	Succeeded by Farouk I
Academic offices
New institution	Rector of Cairo University; 1908–1913	Succeeded by Hussein Rushdi Pasha
Professional and academic associations
Preceded by Onofrio Abbate Pasha	President of the Egyptian Geographic Society; 1915–1918	Succeeded by Isma'il Sidqi Pasha
