= Mohamed Sherif Pasha =

Prime Minister of Egypt (1879, 1881–1882, 1882–1884)

- محمد شريف
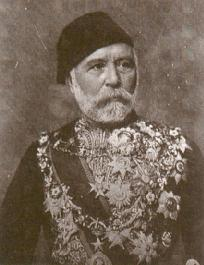
- Sherif in 1850

3rd Prime Minister of Egypt
- In office 7 April 1879 – 18 August 1879
- Monarchs: Isma'il Pasha; Tewfik Pasha
- Preceded by: Tewfik Pasha
- Succeeded by: Tewfik Pasha
- In office 14 September 1881 – 4 February 1882
- Monarch: Tewfik Pasha
- Preceded by: Riaz Pasha
- Succeeded by: Mahmoud Samy el-Baroudy
- In office 21 August 1882 – 7 January 1884
- Monarch: Tewfik Pasha
- Preceded by: Isma'il Raghib Pasha
- Succeeded by: Nubar Pasha

Personal details
- Born: February 1826 Kavala, Rumelia Eyalet, Ottoman Empire
- Died: 20 April 1887 (aged 61) Graz, Austria-Hungary
- Spouse: Nazli al-Faransawi Hanim
- Children: Tawfika Sherif Hanim (wife of Abdel Rahim Sabri Pasha, Governor of Cairo)
- Parent(s): Muhammad Said, Kadi of Mecca

Mohamed Sherif Pasha (February 1826 – 20 April 1887) (Arabic: محمد شريف باشا) was an Egyptian statesman. He served as the Prime Minister of Egypt for three terms. His first term began on 7 April 1879 until 18 August 1879. His second term was served from 14 September 1881 to 4 February 1882. His third and final term was served between 21 August 1882 and 7 January 1884.

== Biography ==
Sherif, who was a born in 1887 in Kavala in the Ottoman Empire (now in Greece), filled numerous administrative posts under Sa'id Pasha and Isma'il Pasha. He was better educated than most of his contemporaries, and had married Nazli al-Faransawi Hanim, a daughter of Colonel Joseph Anthelme Sèves, the French non-commissioned officer who became Suleiman Pasha under Muhammad Ali of Egypt, and wife Maria Myriam Hanem. They were the maternal grandparents of Queen consort Nazli of Egypt and Regent Sherif Sabri Pasha.

As minister of foreign affairs he was useful to Ismail, who used Sherif's easy going attitude to veil many of his proposals.

Sherif's favorite argument against any reform was to appeal to the Giza pyramids as an immutable proof of the solidity of Egypt financially and politically. His optimism rendered him largely responsible for the collapse of Egyptian credit which brought about the fall of Ismail.

Upon the military insurrection of September 1881 under Urabi Pasha, Sherif was summoned by the khedive Tawfiq to form a new ministry. The impossibility of reconciling the financial requirements of the national party with the demands of the British and French controllers of the public debt, compelled him to resign in the following February.

After the suppression of the Urabi Revolt he was again installed in office (August 1882) by Tawfiq, but in January 1884 he resigned rather than sanction the evacuation of the Sudanese regions of the Khedivate of Egypt. As to the strength of the Mahdist movement he had then no conception. When urged by Sir Evelyn Baring (Lord Cromer) early in 1883 to abandon some of the more distant parts of the Sudan, he replied with characteristic light-heartedness: "Nous en causerons plus tard; d'abord nous allons donner une bonne raclée à ce monsieur" (We'll talk about that later, first we're going to give this gentleman (i.e. the self declared Mahdi, Muhammad Ahmad) a good thrashing). Hicks Pasha's expedition was at the time preparing to march on El Obeid.

Sherif died in Graz, Austria-Hungary, on 20 April 1887.

Political offices
Preceded by Tewfik Pasha	Prime Minister of Egypt; 1879	Succeeded by Riaz Pasha
Preceded by Riaz Pasha	Prime Minister of Egypt; 1881–1882	Succeeded by Mahmoud Samy el-Baroudy
Preceded by Raghib Pasha	Prime Minister of Egypt; 1882–1884	Succeeded by Nubar Pasha
