= List of Egyptian people of Turkish descent =

The following is a list of notable Egyptians of at least partial Turkish descent.

== List ==
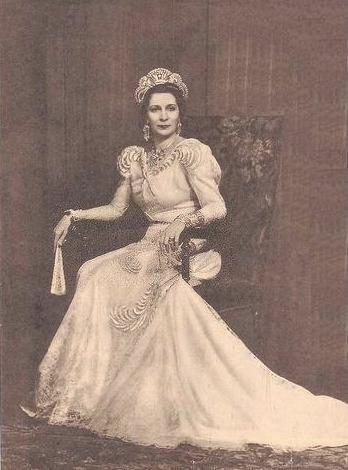
The first Queen of Egypt Nazli Sabri was maternally of Turkish descent.

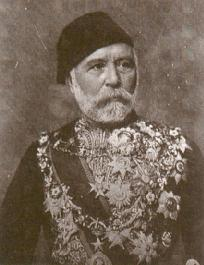
Mohamad Sharif Pasha served as Prime Minister of the Khedivate of Egypt three times.

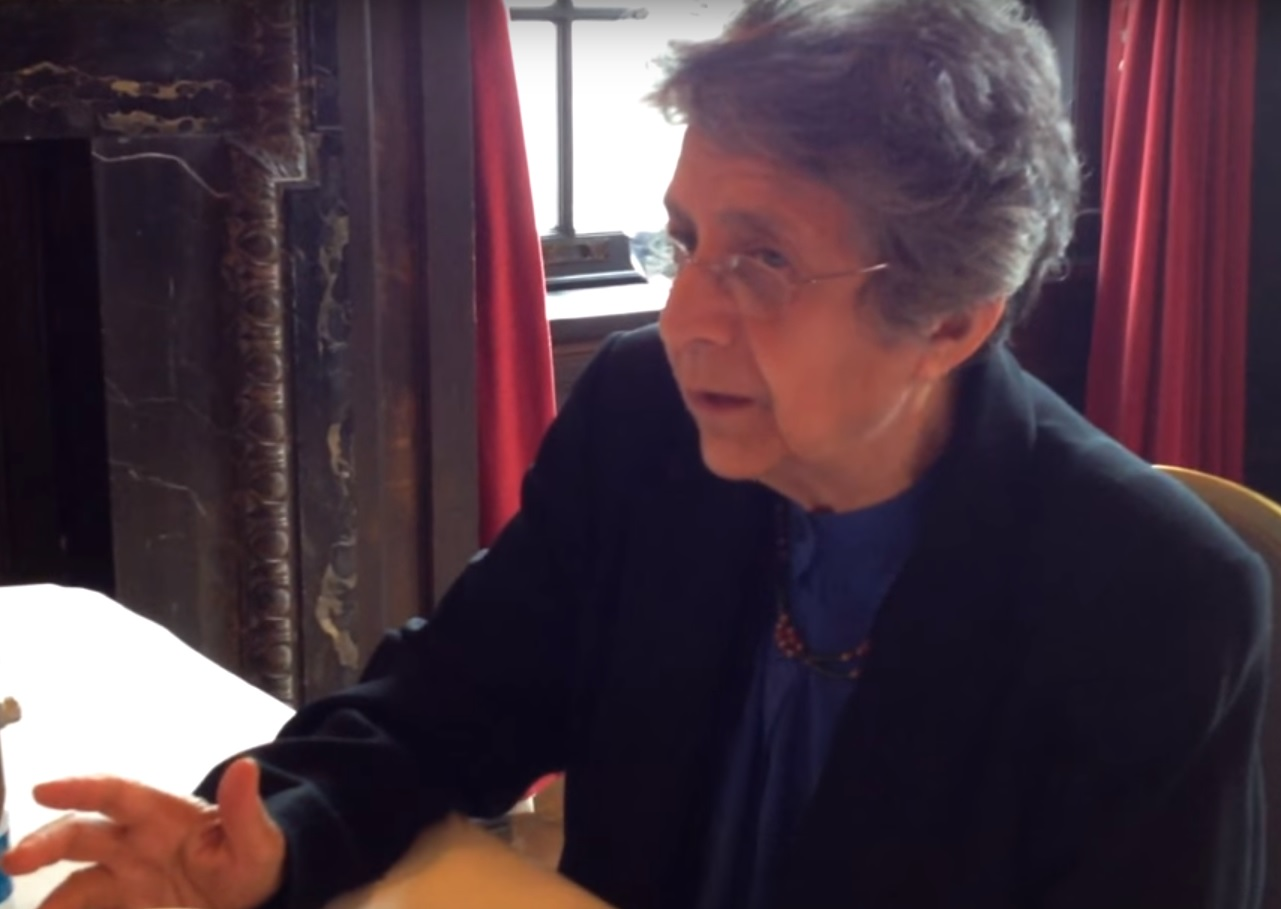
The Islamic feminist scholar Leila Ahmed is maternally of Turkish origin.

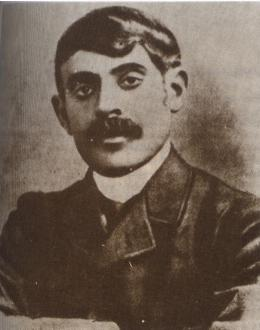
Qasim Amin was born to father of partial paternal Turkish origin, and Egyptian mother. He was one of the founders of the Egyptian national movement and Cairo University.

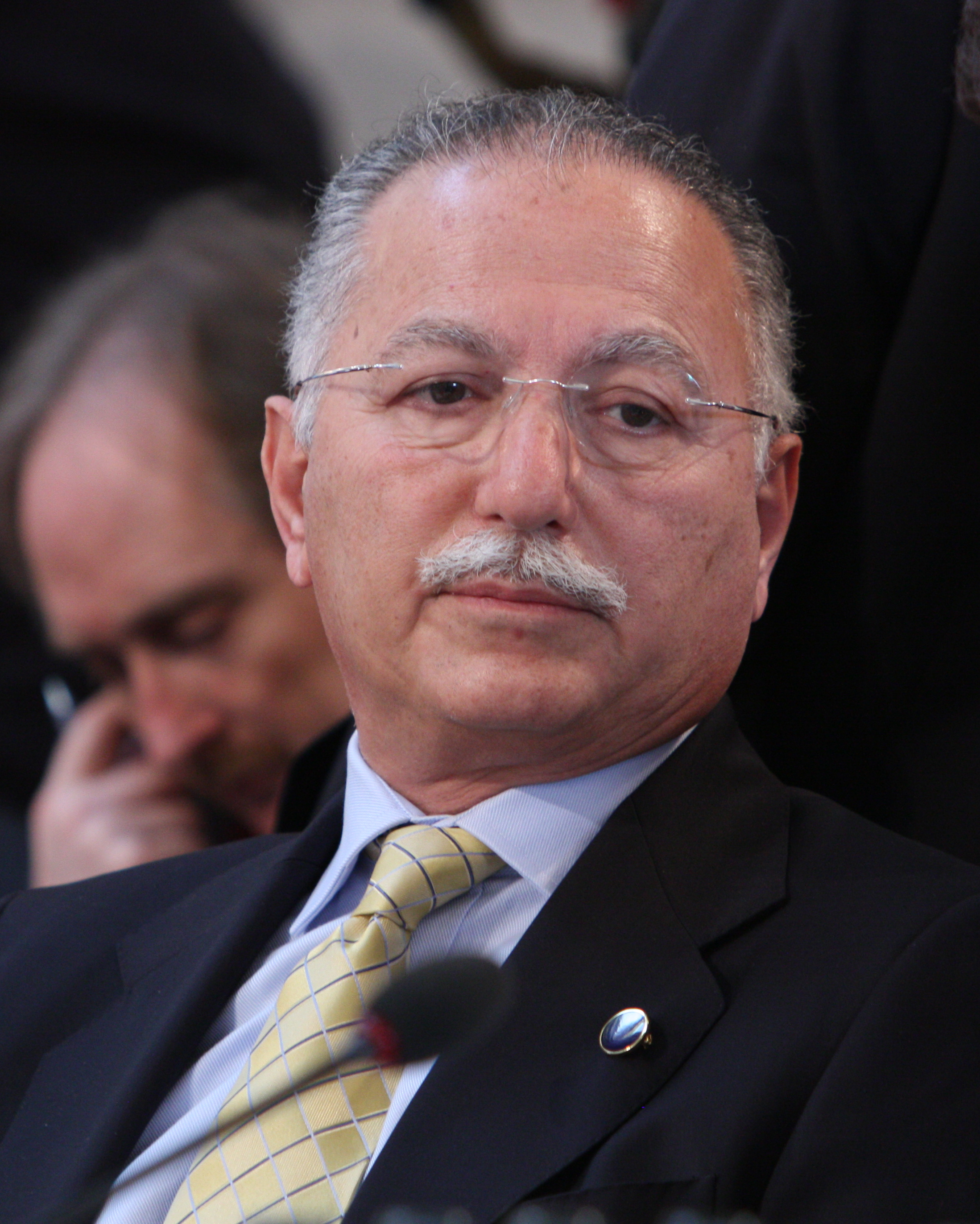
Cairo-born Ekmeleddin İhsanoğlu is a Turkish politician, academic, and the former Secretary-General of the Organisation of Islamic Cooperation.

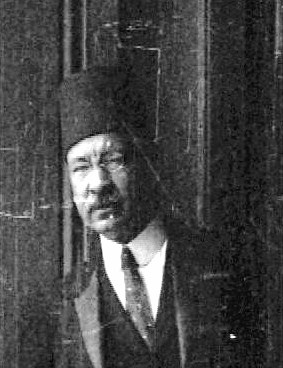
Abdel Khalek Sarwat was the first Prime Minister of the Kingdom of Egypt. He was from an aristocratic Turkish family.

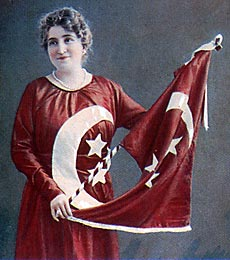
Of Turkish origin, Safiya Zaghloul played an important role in Egypt's political movement and was called "Umm Al-Masryeen" ("the Mother of Egyptians").

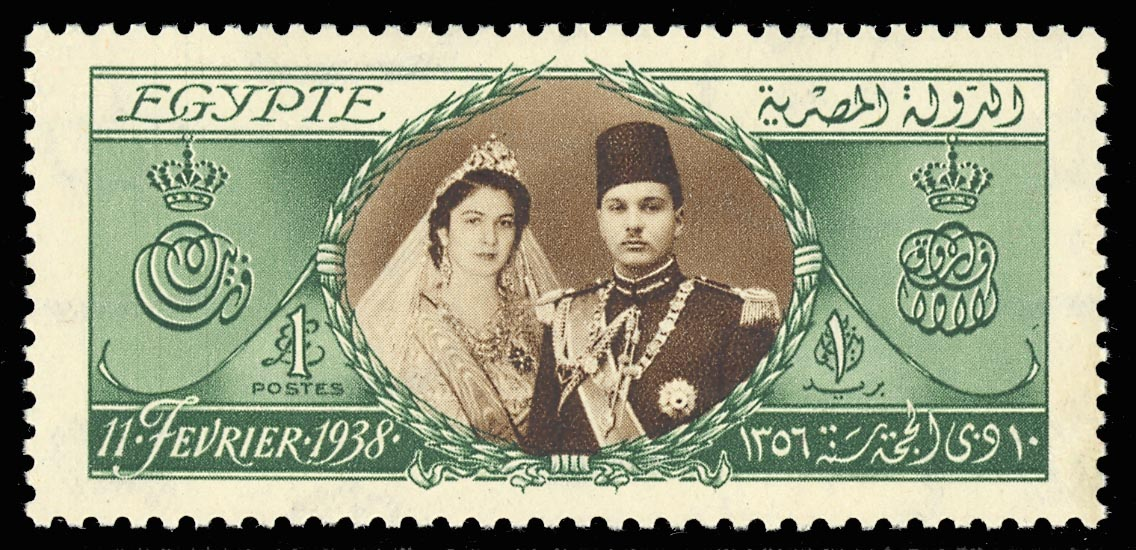
King Farouk of Egypt with Queen Farida of Egypt, on a one Egyptian Pound Stamp.

- Farida of Egypt, Queen of Egypt
  - children:
    - Princess Farial of Egypt
    - Princess Fawzia Farouk of Egypt
    - Princess Fadia of Egypt
- Nazli Sabri, first Queen of Egypt
  - children:
  - Faika of Egypt
  - Farouk of Egypt, King of Egypt and the Sudan
  - Fawzia of Egypt, Queen of Iran
  - Princess Fathia Ghali of Egypt
  - Princess Faiza Rauf of Egypt
- Abbas II of Egypt, Khedive of Egypt
- Princess Lulie, the first Muslim woman to study at Oxford University
- Muhammad Abduh, religious scholar and liberal reformer
- Tatamkulu Afrika, poet
- Shajart al-Durr, the second Muslim woman to become a monarch in Islamic history origin, and described by historians as a beautiful, pious and intelligent woman
- Tawfiq al-Hakim, writer
- Leila Ahmed, writer
- Ismail Falaki, astronomer and mathematician
- Mustafa Manfaluti, writer
- Qasim Amin, jurist and women's rights activist
- Hussein Bikar, painter
- Nonie Darwish, human rights activist
- Nawal El Saadawi, feminist
- Mustafa Fahmi, Prime Minister of Egypt
- Abdel Rahman Fahmy, writer
- Mohammad Farid, nationalist leader, writer and lawyer
- Hussein Fakhry, minister of education & Prime Minister of Egypt
- Laila Fawzi, Miss Egypt (1940) & actress
- Dodi Fayed, film producer & last companion of Diana, Princess of Wales
- Zakariyya Ahmad, musician
- Mustafa Fazıl, Prince, third son of Ibrahim Pasha of Egypt and his consort Ulfat Qadin (died 1865)
  - children:
  - Ismail Fazıl, Ottoman and Turkish politician
  - Nazli Fazil, Princess
- Mahmud Tahir Haqqi, writer
- Yahya Haqqi, writer
- Adel Adham, actor
- Aziza Shukri Hussein, social welfare expert
- Hafez Ibrahim, poet
- Ekmeleddin İhsanoğlu, former Secretary-General of the Organisation of the Islamic Conference
- Khalid Islambouli, army officer
- Muhammad Jalal, writer
- Yakup Kadri Karaosmanoğlu, writer
- Ahmed Kamal, Egyptologist
- Kasim Kutay, CEO of Novo Holdings A/S.
- Amin Maalouf, writer
- Ahmed Magdy, actor
- Şemsettin Mardin, Turkish ambassador to Lebanon
- Nihal Mazloum, jeweler and artisan
- Ahmad Mazlum, cabinet minister and parliamentary leader
- Cesa Nabarawi, feminist
- Effat Nagy, artist, born to an Egyptian father, and a Turkish mother
- Muhammad Naji, painter
- Muhammad Tawfiq Nasim, Prime Minister of Egypt
- Mahmoud El Nokrashy, second prime minister of the Kingdom of Egypt
- Wedad Orfi, filmmaker
- Isma'il Pasha, Khedive of Egypt
- Khedive Tewfik of Egypt
- Tusun Pasha, father of Abbas I of Egypt
- Poussi, actress
- Noura Qadry, actress
- Ihsan Abdel Quddous
- Ahmed Rami, poet
- Hussein Refki, war minister and senator
- Hussein Riad, actor
- Hind Rostom, actress
- Zaki Rostom, actor
- Hussein Rushdi, PM, Prime Minister of Egypt
- Ali Sabri, Prime Minister of Egypt
- Sherif Sabri, Pasha, politician
- Muhammad Said, Prime Minister of Egypt
  - children:
  - Mahmoud Sa'id, painter
- Hussein Salem, businessman
- Abdel Khalek Sarwat, PM, Prime Minister of Egypt
- Ahmed Zaki Abu Shadi, poet
- Muhammad Sharif, Prime Minister of Egypt
- Ahmed Shawqi, writer
- Shadia, actress
- Fouad Shafiq, actor
- Shwikar, actress
- Gazbia Sirry, painter
- Halil Şerif ("Khalil-Bey"), diplomat and art collector
- Muhammed Taher, the "father" of the Mediterranean Games
- Zain al-Saharaf, Queen, Queen of Jordan
- Ahmed Taymour, writer
- Aisha Taymuriyya, writer
- Ibn Tulun, founder of the Tulunid dynasty
- Hasan Tuwayrani, writer
- Youssef Wahbi, actor
- Adham Wanly, painter.
- Seif Wanly, painter
- Adly Yakan, PM, Prime Minister of Egypt
- Nil Yalter, artist
- Rose al Yusuf, actress and journalist
- Safiya Zaghloul, political activist dubbed "Umm Al-Masryeen" ("the Mother of Egyptians")
- Maurice Zilber, horse trainer
- Youssef Zulficar, judge and father-in-law of Farouk of Egypt

== See also ==
Ottoman Empire

List of Algerians of Turkish origin
