= Princess Ferial of Egypt =

Egyptian royal

Ferial
- Princess of Egypt
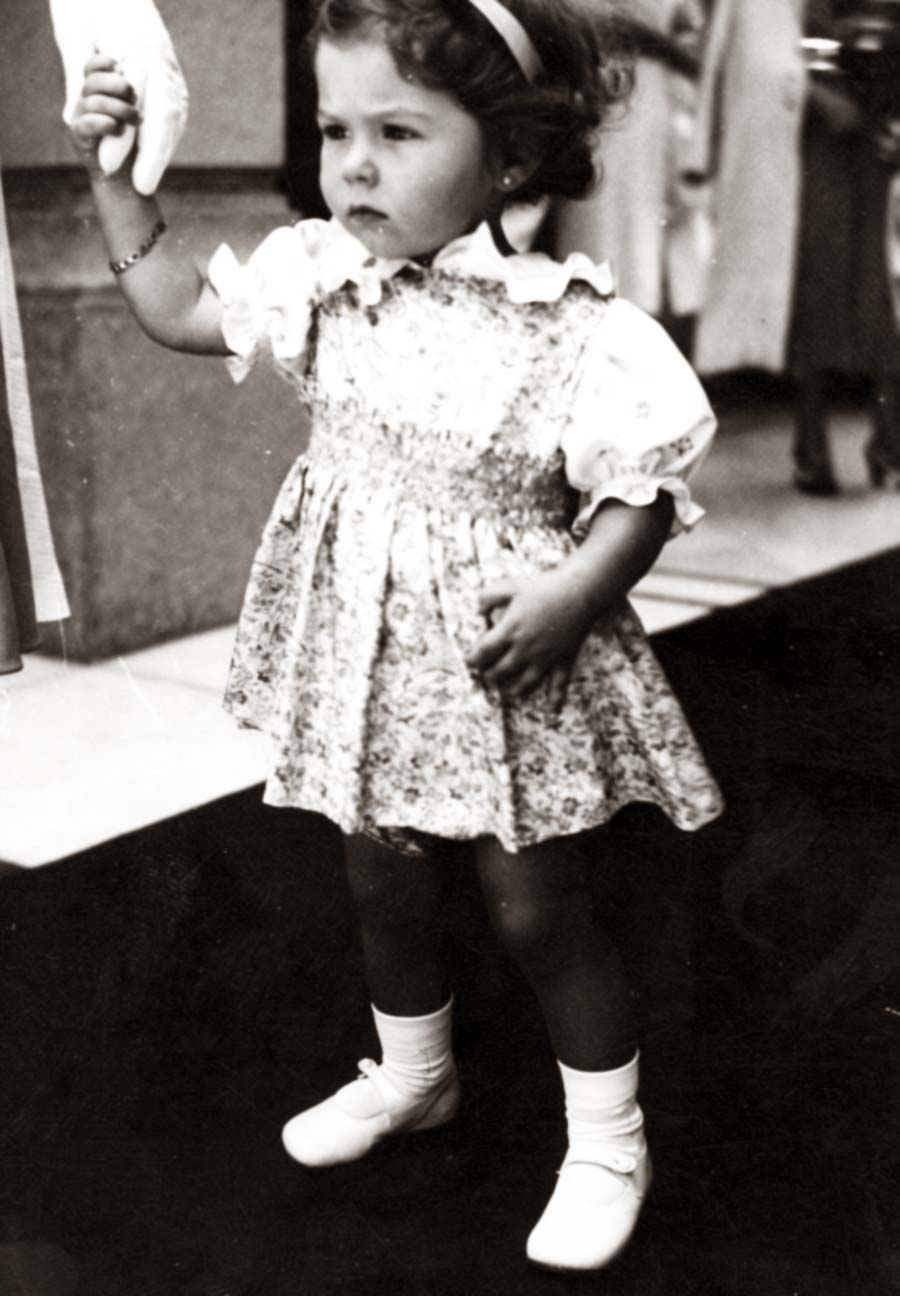
- Ferial in the early 1940s, photographed by Riad Shehata
- Born: 17 November 1938; Montaza Palace, Alexandria, Egypt
- Died: 29 November 2009 (aged 71); Montreux, Switzerland
- Burial: Khedival Mausoleum, Al-Rifa'i Mosque
- Spouse: Jean-Pierre Perreten (m. 1966; died 1968)
- Issue: Yasmine Perreten-Shaarawi
- House: Muhammad Ali Dynasty
- Father: Farouk of Egypt
- Mother: Safinaz Zulficar

Princess Ferial (also spelled Farial, Feryal, Arabic: الأميرة فريال; 17 November 1938 – 29 November 2009) was the eldest child of Egypt's penultimate monarch, King Farouk.

== Early life ==
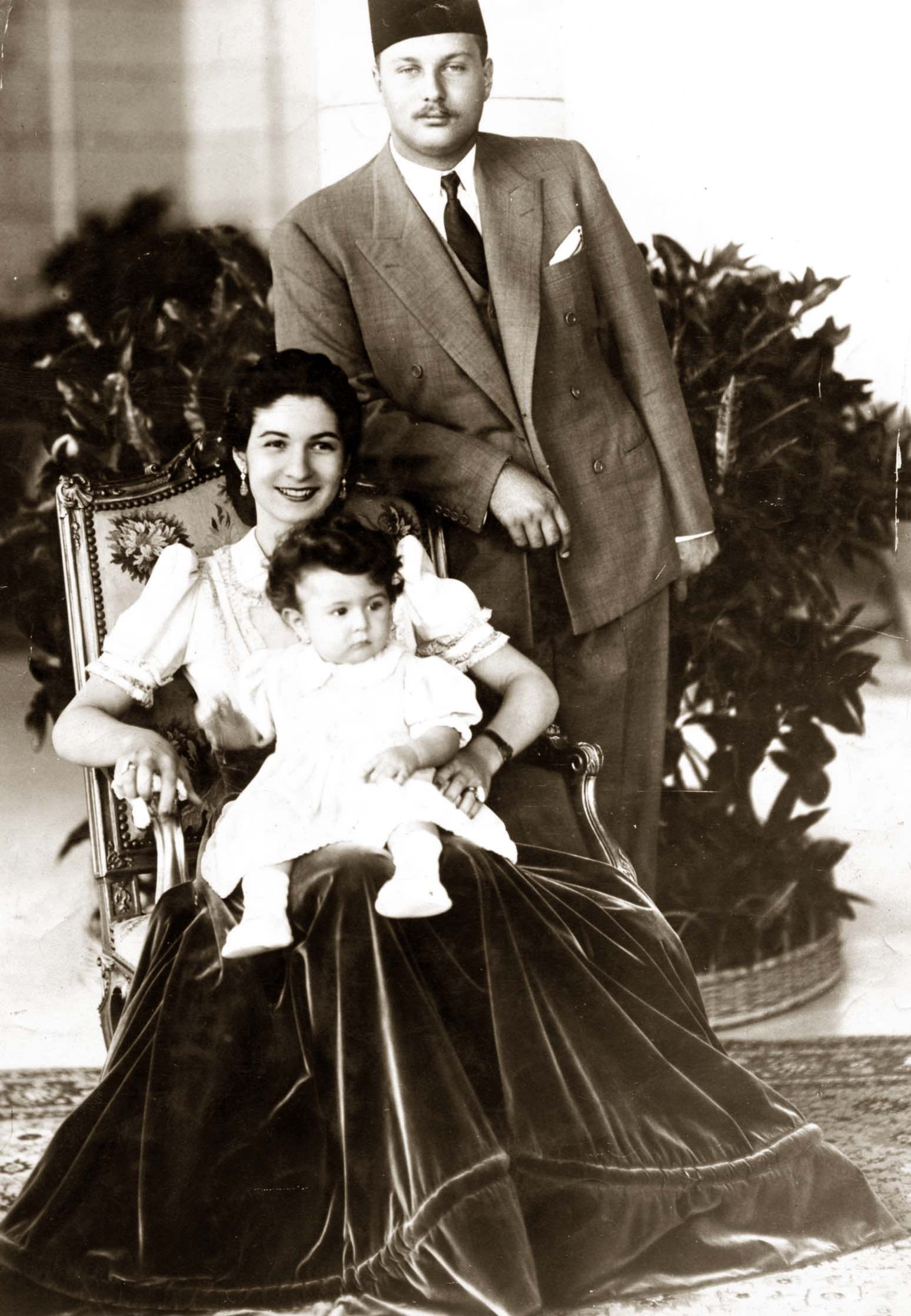
Ferial with King Farouk and Queen Farida, c. 1940.

Ferial was born on 17 November 1938. At the time of her birth, King Farouk was eighteen years of age and his wife, Farida of Egypt, was seventeen. Her birth was marked by nationwide celebrations which included the distribution of clothes and free breakfasts to thousands of poor. In addition, each of the 1,700 families of infants born on the same day were given E£1, a generous gift at the time. Princess Ferial was later joined by two sisters, Princesses Fawzia and Fadia. In search of an heir, King Farouk divorced Queen Farida in 1949 and married Narriman Sadek. That marriage produced Fuad II, Ferial's half-brother and last King of Egypt.

== Life in exile ==
In 1952, the Revolution by the Free Officers sent the royal family into exile in Italy. Ferial left Egypt at the age of 13 on the royal yacht Mahroussa. The family's time in exile was spent in Naples, Capri and Rome. Ferial's correspondence with her mother Farida shows that she was very sad to leave Egypt and especially the people she knew and loved there.

Ferial was unable to return to Egypt while Nasser remained in power. Not until 1973, three years into Sadat's regime was she allowed access to the country and permitted an Egyptian passport. She would later spend her summers in Egypt with her daughter Yasmine visiting relatives.

=== Education ===
At the will of their father Farouk, Ferial and her sisters were educated privately, and then at Grand Verger Finishing School, a boarding school in Lutry, Switzerland. Their mother stayed in Egypt for 10 years after their exile eventually moving to Lebanon and then reuniting with them in Switzerland.

=== Family life ===
Ferial’s father Farouk was a very strict parent during their exile, requiring the sisters to get permission for even trivial things such as haircuts and wearing nail polish. Her father only gave her permission to teach at a sectarian school in Lausanne if she kept her identity a secret.

Ferial lived the majority of her life before her marriage outside of Montreux, where she taught typing and French literature. Later when she married, she and her husband operated a hotel in the area.

In 1966, Ferial married the Swiss Jean-Pierre Perreten, at Westminster, London. Perreten was the son of a Swiss hotelier and converted to Islam to make the marriage possible. He took on the name Samir Cheriff as part of his conversion. They had one daughter, Yasmine Perreten-Sha'arawi, in 1967. Ferial and Perreten divorced shortly after their daughter's birth. Ferial did not remarry. Perreten died in 1968. In 2004 Yasmine married 'Ali Sha'arawi, who is the grandson of Huda Sha'arawi, an iconic Egyptian author and feminist.

After Ferial’s mother Queen Farida died in 1988, she and her two sisters were prompted to file a lawsuit against the Egyptian government over their ownership of a royal palace in the Nile Delta. The sisters believed that the land and property belonged to their mother and that with her death, they were the rightful owners of the property. However, the Egyptian court ruled against them because their parents' divorce had voided their mother's claim to the land even before all royal property was taken over during the revolution.

Ferial spent the rest of her life out of the public eye taking care of her siblings. Her sister Fawzia suffered from multiple sclerosis and died in 2005. Her brother Fuad went through a great depression after his divorce from his wife Dominique-France Picard. While Ferial was not supportive of this marriage, she supported her brother through his emotional struggles.

== Death ==
Princess Ferial died in a hospital on 29 November 2009, aged 71, in Montreux, Switzerland, where she had been receiving treatment for cancer, which she was diagnosed with in 2002.

Ferial was buried alongside her family in the Khedival mausoleum of Cairo's Rifa'i Mosque. This is where all members of the Muhammad Ali dynasty are buried.

== Ancestors ==
Princess Ferial of Egypt is of Circassian (26/32), Turkish (3/32), French (2/32) and Albanian (1/32) descent.

Ancestors of Princess Ferial of Egypt

16. Ibrahim Pasha, Viceroy of Egypt
8. Isma'il Pasha, Khedive of Egypt
17. Khushiyar Kadin
4. Fuad I, King of Egypt
9. Ferial Kadin
2. Farouk I, King of Egypt
20. Hussein Sabri
10. Abdel Rahim Sabri Pasha, Governor of Cairo
21. Niaz Hanim
5. Nazli Sabri
22. Muhammad Sharif Pasha, Prime Minister of Egypt
11. Tewfika Hanem
23. Nazli El-Fransawi
1. Princess Ferial of Egypt
24. Youssef Bey Rasmi
12. Ali Zulficar Pasha, Governor of Cairo
6. Youssef Zulficar Pasha
26. Muhammad Mohyi Pasha
13. Aziza Hanem
3. Safinaz Zulficar (Queen Farida)
14. Muhammad Sa'id Pasha, Prime Minister of Egypt
7. Zeinab Hanem
