= As-Sufūr =

Egyptian weekly avant-garde literary magazine

As-Sufūr (Arabic: السُفور, lit. 'The Unveiling') was an Egyptian weekly avant-garde literary magazine published May 21, 1915—October 22, 1922, with few, irregular publications into 1925.

It was founded by a group of writers: Mohammed Hussein Heikal, Mustafa 'Abd ar-Raziq, Mansur Fahmi, and Taha Hussein. Abd al-Hamid Hamdi was the editor-in-chief.

== Name ==
The word sufūr (سُفور 'unveiling') in Arabic is the opposite of hijāb (حِجاب 'veiling'). In the introductory text of the magazine's first issue, the editor Abd al-Hamid Hamdi clarified the choice of the word for the magazine's title:

للسفور معنى أشمل مما يتبادر إليه الذهن عند سماع هذه الكلمة التي جرت بها أقلام الباحثين في مسألة المرأة المصرية.

ليست المرأة وحدها هي المحجبة في مصر، ولكنها محجبة نزعاتنا وفضائلنا وكفاءاتنا ومعارفنا وأمانينا. وكل شيء يبدو على غير حقيقته. فنحن أمة محجبة بحقيقتها. بادية منها ظواهر كاذبة
Sufūr has a more comprehensive meaning than that for which the mind first reaches at hearing this word oft produced by the pens of researchers on the question of the Egyptian woman.

Women alone are not all that is veiled in Egypt. Veiled are our natures, virtues, competencies, knowledge, and aspirations. Everything appears not as it truly is. We are truly a veiled nation, giving off untruthful appearances.

—Abd al-Hamid Hamdi in the first edition of as-Sufūr

== History ==
When the Ottoman Empire entered World War I, Britain, under British Army Officer John Maxwell, enacted legislation on November 2, 1914 that subjected the Egyptian press to censorship. This created a paucity in the Arabic press and caused many papers to cease publication. Among the periodicals affected was Ahmed Lutfi es-Sayed's newspaper Al Jarida. When the conditions drove Ahmed Lutfi es-Sayed away from the paper, some of his writers—Abd al-Hamid Hamdi, Mustafa 'Abd ar-Raziq, Mohammed Hussein Heikal, Mansur Fahmi, and Taha Hussein—sought to resist. They attempted to buy the rights to Abd ar-Rahman al-Barquqi's magazine al-Bayan, but negotiations were unfruitful. Instead, the writers established a company and to publish as-Sufūr under Abd al-Hamid Hamdi, who assumed fiscal responsibility for the paper.

The first edition was published May 21, 1915 with eight pages. Its 307th edition was published October 22, 1922, after which it published irregularly in 1923. It was officially forced into decommission as its license was revoked for about a year and a half after publishing content deemed to have transgressed its social-literary bounds into something political. It published a few editions in 1925 before disappearing for good.

Muhammad Taimur published short stories in as-Sufūr from 1917. It was later acquired by members of al-Madrasa al-Haditha for 50 Egyptian pounds and edited by Ahmed Khairi Sa'id, serving as a precursor to the movement's magazine Al-Fajr (1925-1927).

== Sections ==
Editions of as-Sufur were typically organized into the following sections:

- Introduction
- Society
- Critique
- Literature
- Comedy
- Stories
