= Zeinab Zulficar =

Egyptian noble (1895–1990)

- Born: Zeinab Muhammad Saeed; 18 September 1895
- Died: 18 March 1990 (aged 94); Cairo Governorate, Egypt
- Title: Lady of Honor of the royal court
- Spouse: Youssef Zulficar Pasha (m. 1920; died 1965)
- Children: Farida Zulficar; Muhammad Zulficar; Cherif Zulficar
- Parents: Muhammad Said Pasha (father); Adila Hanim Mazloum (mother)
- Relatives: Mahmoud Sa'id (brother)

Zeinab Zulficar (born Zeinab Saeed Arabic: زينب سعيد; 20 September 1895 - 18 March 1990) was the first lady-in-waiting of Nazli Sabri and the mother of Queen Farida.

== Biography ==
Born on 20 September 1895 to a prominent family. Her father was Mohamed Saeed Pasha, who served as the prime minister and her mother was Adila Hanim Mazloum. Her brother was the painter Mahmoud Sa'id.

Zeinab attended Collège Notre-Dame de Sion in Alexandria. She lived in the palace of her father, Muhammad Saeed Pasha, which was next to the palace of Nazli Sabri, and she quickly became friends with Nazli. When Nazli Sabri married King Fuad, she appointed Zeinab Saeed as her first lady-in-waiting and gave her the title of «Lady of honour of the royal court». In 1920, Zenaib married Yousef Zulficar, an Egyptian judge and diplomat. They had 3 children: Farida, Mohamed and Cherif.

In 1937, Zeinab and her daughter Farida accompanied the Egyptian royal family in their tour around Europe. During this tour, her daughter Farida and Farouk got to know each other and married in 1938. After the 1952 revolution, Zeinab lived with her daughter Farida in Cairo. She later died on 18 March 1990 and was buried in Cairo.

== See also ==
- Narriman Sadek
- Nahed Rashad
