= Zaynab Fawwaz =

Lebanese activist, playwright, and historian

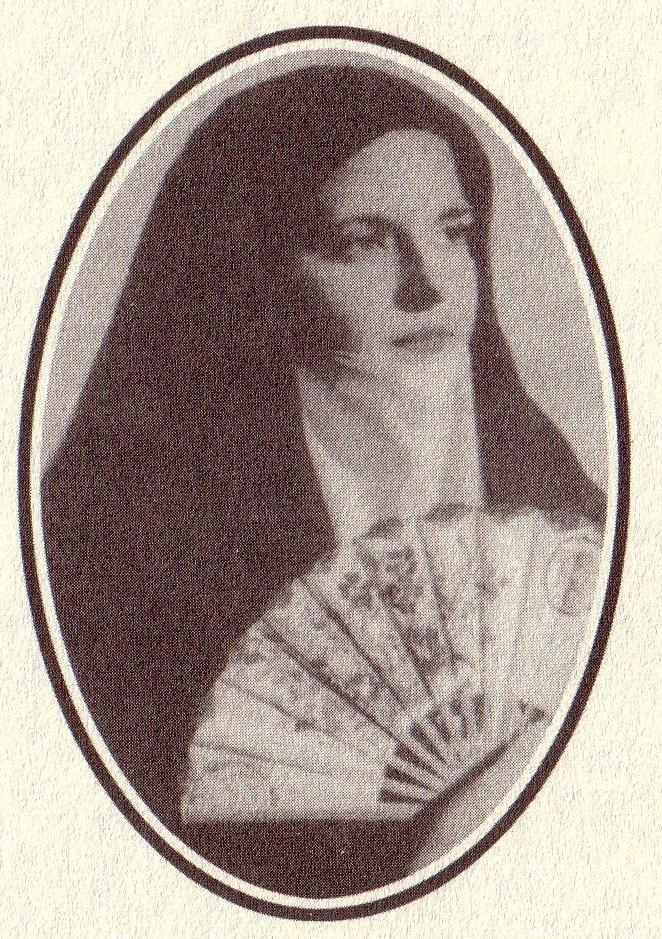
- Born: 1860; Tebnine, Lebanon, Ottoman Empire
- Died: 1914 (aged 53–54); Cairo, Cairo district, Sultanate of Egypt
- Occupations: Novelist, Poet, Playwright, Activist, Historian, Writer, Philosopher and Journalist
- Known for: First Arab woman to write a play
- Notable work: The Happy Ending, Passion and Fidelity

Zaynab Fawwaz (1860–1914) was a Lebanese women's rights activist, novelist, playwright, poet and historian of famous women. Her novel "حسن العواقب/Ḥusn al-Awaqib", (The Happy Ending, 1899) is considered the first novel in Arabic written by a woman. Her play, "الهوى والوفاء/Al-Haawa wa al-Wafa" (Passion and Fidelity, 1893), is the first play written in Arabic by a woman.

Throughout her writing career, Zaynab possessed a competitive character and competed with the work of Muhammad Hussein Heikal, and challenged Qasim Amin's call for women liberation. Her work came to a climax during the last quarter of the nineteenth century and the start of the twentieth century in Egypt.

== Early life ==
Little is known of Zaynab's early life and her exact date of birth is uncertain. In Joseph Zeidan's account, Zaynab Fawwāz represents a unique phenomenon among pioneering women writers. She was from a poor illiterate Shiite family in the village of Tabnīn in southern Lebanon. As a girl she served as a maid at the palace of ʿAlī Bey al-Asʿad al-Ṣaghīr. Her work at the palace brought her into contact with Fāṭimah al-Khalīl, the prince's wife, who was a poet. Fāṭimah al-Khalīl recognized her intellectual potential and began to tutor her. Zaynab married Khalil Bey Al-Assaad, a falconer, but the marriage did not succeed. She separated from him and moved to Damascus with her father. There she married a Damascene writer, Adib Nazmi, but divorced him, too.

After moving to Syria, she married an officer in the Egyptian military and relocated to Egypt. She lived in Alexandria and embarked on a literary career, writing letters that were published in the main newspapers of Egypt, making a name for herself in the cultural milieu. During this time, she also wrote two novels. In 1894, she published a biographical dictionary called "الدر المنثور في طبقات ربات الخدور/al-Durr al-manthur fi tabaqat rabbat al-khudur" or The Book of Scattered Pearls Regarding Categories of Women.

Unusual at that time, Zaynab along with Aisha Taymur were the only forerunners who had the courage to express in writing. Fawwaz issued her works and articles in many papers such as Al-Moayyed, Al-Nile, Al-Ahali, Al-Liwaa, Al-Ustaz, Al-Fata, and others. Her work was mainly focused on encouraging the freedom of education, especially women's education.

Although she married more than once, she never had any children.

== Literary career ==
When Zaynab moved to Alexandria, Egypt, she became the student of the poet and owner of Al-Nil Magazine, Hasan Husni Pasha Al-Tuwayrani. Under his guidance, she began to write articles on social issues affecting women, under the pseudonym of Durrat al-Sharq (Pearl of the East).

According to the Critical Reference Guide of Arab Women Writers, Fawwaz was "the first woman's voice calling for the women's awakening and defending their rights, humanity, and equality with men." It was during her stay in Damascus with her second husband, the writer Adib Nazmi al-Dimashqi, that Zaynab Fawwaz founded a literary salon. As she wore the "niqab" and could not sit with the male participants; she would sit in another room of the house conducting the discussion, with her husband acting as the messenger for her and her guests.

Besides her journalism, Zaynab was particularly noted for her "الدر المنثور في طبقات ربات الخدور", (The Book of Scattered Pearls Regarding Categories of Women, 1894–95), a large-folio, 552-page biographical dictionary of some 456 women and their achievements. Zaynab did not write anything about herself in this work, but rather she celebrated and supported other women's achievements.

Zaynab also wrote two novels and a play, putting her at the forefront of the emergence of the novel in Arabic.

Her first novel was "حسن العواقب", (The Happy Ending, 1899) and is considered to be the first novel written by an Arab female. In this novel, Zaynab dared to criticize the society in which she lived. This act was considered very courageous and heroic. In her writing, Zaynab showed that she supports women's free will and decision-making. She also glorified women's self-esteem and confidence. It is believed that Zaynab's intention behind this novel is to praise women's strength and perseverance as well as their rights in education. She also showed that marriage should be based on love and understanding.

Her play, "الهوى والوفاء" (Love and Faithfulness, 1893), was the first play written in Arabic by a woman.

Zaynab has many other published books including:

- "الرسائل الزينبية", in which she argued about women's rights in education and in the work field.
- "مدراك الكمال في تراجم الرجال"
- "الجوهر النضيد في مآثر الملك الحميد"
- "الملك قوروش" al-Malik Qurush (King Cyrus), published in 1905

== Philosophical and political views ==
Zaynab Fawwaz was a women's rights activist. Her tendency to liberate women was visible in many situations. She started with encouraging the citizens of her country to participate in all meetings, exhibitions, and associations related to women's rights to proper education, and specifically the conference of the International Women's Union in Santiago in 1893. During that conference, the members voted on a decision that prevented women from obtaining the appropriate education, a decision that was stemmed from the idea that a woman's place is at home and her activity should be limited to family. This drove Zaynab to criticize and attack the organizers as well as the participants of that conference for letting this decision pass.

She stressed the importance and the necessity of granting women their rights and widening their scope of activity in the community, particularly in the field of science. Zaynab also responded to the article written by the representative of the Syrian women in that conference, Mrs. Hana Kourani. Kourani's article was published in the newspaper "Lebanon" in which she called for restricting women's work to households and leaving all the other social/political activities for men. Zaynab's critique was influenced by women's movements and riots (in London back in the days of Gladstone) in which they demanded that women must be included in all aspects of life such as politics and decision making. This was the main principle that Zaynab supported. She argued that no reason prevented a woman from engaging in all works and in political issues or any other field. Zaynab called for novel principles and for new laws that guarantee the regulation of women's lives and their rights in education and work. Therefore, Zaynab's morals and intellectual values were based on raising her voice to always defend women's rights.

Fawwaz was constantly preoccupied with public issues and debated to defend women's rights. She demanded to preserve women's rights in participating in political and intellectual issues.

At a certain period, the country of Algeria entered a state of famine and economic crisis. All these factors triggered Fawwaz to call the Egyptians to help the Algerian citizens.

Zaynab was one of Mustafa Kamil's primary supporters. She always was thrived and eager to attend his speeches. Zaynab highly influenced Mustafa and changed his speeches forms. His speeches were previously addressed to "men" and became addressed to "ladies and gentlemen". It was all because of Zaynab that the presence and value of women became real.

Qasim Amin and Zaynab Fawwaz had similar views in their published articles. Fawwaz criticized many factors that were prevailing back then: the elimination of women's free will, the obligation of the veil upon them, and preventing them from a proper education... In addition, Fawwaz complained about the fact that women were prevented from exercising any political, social, national, and cultural role and thus limiting them to household works. All this implied that ignorance was being imposed on all women back then. Qasim Amin supported Zaynab when he published his two books "Women's Liberation" and "The New Woman" which reinforced the liberation of women. It is well known that Zaynab's letters on women's issues were published in the Egyptian newspapers before 1892. However, Qasimm Amin did not publish his book "The Liberation of Women" until 1898.

== Recognitions ==
Unfortunately, it is hard to track the real influence and impact that Zaynab had on her surroundings. Many Syrian researchers and writers have said that they've heard of Zaynab's name but her writings remain strange to them. However, Zaynab did leave an impact on many people in Syria, where a school was named after her.

Also, most of Zaynab's writings are not present in any library and remain forgotten. It's believed that this neglect towards Zaynab's publications is due to her social class. Zaynab belonged to a less fortunate family and lived a very simple and modest life.

== Death ==
Zaynab Fawwaz died in 1914, in Cairo, Egypt.
