= Ahmed Khairi Sa'id =

Egyptian literary figure

Ahmed Khairi Sa'id (Arabic: أحمد خيري سعيد) was an Egyptian literary figure, theoretician of Al-Madrasa al-Ḥadītha, and editor of its publication: al-Fajar.

Muhammad Amin Hassuna described him as a Bohemian and Epicurean. He originated the concept of "al-Hadam wal-Bina'" (الهدم والبناء "destruction and construction") and called for literary renewal. He also coined the slogan of Al-Madrasa al-Ḥadītha: "Long live authenticity, long live innovation. Long live renewal and reform." (فلتحيا الأصالة ، فليحيا الإبداع . فليحيا التجديد والإصلاح).

He is considered a father of the modern Arabic short story, along with Mahmud Taymur, Mahmud Tahir Lashin, Yahya Haqqi, and others.

Muhammad Amin Hassuna profiled him in his column on Modern Arabic literature in Al-Hadith.
