= Al-Boustaguy =

Al-Boustaguy / El-Bostagy The Postman
- Directed by: Hussein Kamal
- Written by: Donia El-Baba, Moussa Sabry
- Starring: Shukri Sarhan, Seif Abdelrahman, Zizi Mostapha
- Distributed by: Cairo Film Production Agency
- Release date: 1968
- Running time: 114 min
- Country: Egypt
- Language: Egyptian Arabic

Al-Boustaguy (Arabic: البوسطجي / "El Bûstacî", from Ottoman Turkish: Postacı, English: The Postman) is an Egyptian film released in 1968.

Adapted from a novel by the Egyptian writer Yahya Haqqi.

== Synopsis ==
A postal officer takes up a job in a small town in Egypt. The postman starts looking for a house for himself and in the meantime he meets the rich notables of the town. He settles in his house and starts his job. However, he cannot adapt to rural life. He is suffocated by unsympathetic people and monotonous life. One day, opens the letters that a young girl wrote to each other with her lover. Thus, he begins to read their correspondence, learns their secrets. But one day he accidentally causes a letter in the letter to change, also intervenes in the lives of young lovers. This situation initiates a process leading to an unexpected disaster.

== Bibliography ==
- DFI Film Review: The Postman (1968), Reem Saleh, New Media, 16 May 2011
- Al Boustagui (1968), Synopsis by Mark Deming, Access date: 13 May 2022

== See also ==
- Cinema of Egypt
