= Al-Katib al-misri (magazine) =

Literary magazine in Egypt (1945–1948)

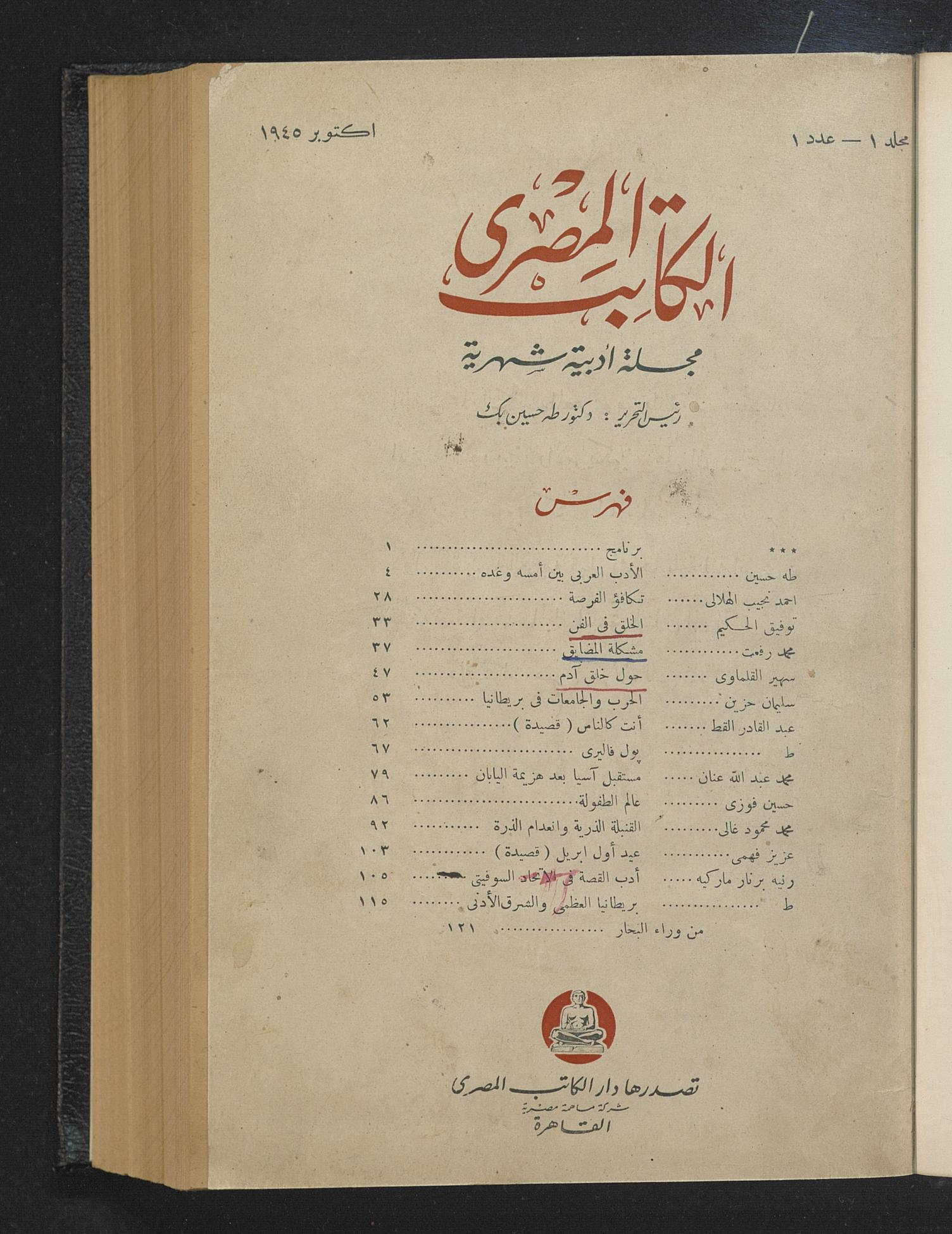
- Cover page of the first issue
- Editor: Taha Hussein
- Categories: Literature, Arts, Science
- Frequency: Monthly
- Founded: 1945
- First issue: October 1945
- Final issue: May 1948
- Country: Egypt
- Based in: Cairo
- Language: Arabic
- Website: nbn-resolving.de/urn:nbn:de:hbz:5:1-219240

The Egyptian journal al-Katib al-misri (Arabic: الكاتب المصري; DMG: al-Kātib al-miṣrī; English: "The Egyptian Writer") was published in Cairo monthly in the period 1945–1948. It featured articles on literature, arts and science. Although its publisher was Jewish, the magazine did not emphasize this fact. However, Taha Hussein, editor of the magazine, was accused of being part of the Zionist movement due to his post.

== History and profile ==
Al-Katib al-misri was founded originally by the Egyptian Press and Publishing House owned by the Jewish Al Harari family who entrusted Taha Hussein with the management. The magazine was modelled on the French magazine Les Temps modernes. The first issue appeared in October 1945. The magazine published a total of 32 issues and was available in numerous Arab metropolises. The last issue of al-Katib al-misri was dated May 1948.

The focus of the journal was the publication of international literature and literary criticism, which were translated into Arabic and so helped to reach a broader readership. Both Arabic and non-Arabic art, literature and science were encouraged and a dialogue between Arabic and other languages should be established. As one of the first post-war magazines, al-Katib al-misri also aimed to make its vision of the enlightenment accessible to all and to promote mutual cultural exchange. "Literature should be lifted above all conflicts existing world-wide."

Major contributors included Mahmud Taymur, Tawfiq Al Hakim, Mohammed Mahdi Al Jawahiri, Yahya Haqqi and Luwis Awad. Arabic translations among others, of works by Antoine de Saint-Exupéry or Jean-Paul Sartre, were published, texts of promising new Arab authors as well as literary criticism, which also offered an introduction by Western authors such as James Joyce or Franz Kafka.

Moreover, two other sections also discussed in detail the contents and orientations of Arabic and European periodicals of the time. In 1948, the publication of the magazine was stopped, whereby it is not clear whether this was spontaneous or under governmental pressure.
