= Muhammad Amin Hassuna =

Egyptian writer

- محمد أمين حسونة
- Born: 1909
- Died: 1956 (aged 46–47)
- Occupations: Writer and critic

Muhammad Amin Hassuna (Arabic: محمد أمين حسونة; 1909–1956) was a 20th-century Egyptian writer, literary critic, and journalist. He published in Arabic literary and cultural magazines such as Arrissalah and Al-Hadith.

In the Al-Hadith magazine published in Aleppo, he had a dedicated column 1933-1934 entitled "In Egyptian Literature / Icons of the Modern School," in which he profiled notable figures in modern Arabic literature, including Ahmad Amin, Ahmed Rami, Ahmed Zaki Abu Shadi, and Ahmed Khayri Sa'id.

His articles in Arrissalah included pieces on Charles Langbridge Morgan's novel Portrait in a Mirror, Italian literature, and Luigi Pirandello.

== Publications ==
His first published book was Cubs of the Revolution (أشبال الثورة). He published a collection of short stories entitled White Rose (الورد الأبيض) with an introduction by Mahmud Taymur. His book Beyond the Seas (الورد الأبيض) is of rihla genre.
