= Ahmad Mazlum =

Egyptian politician

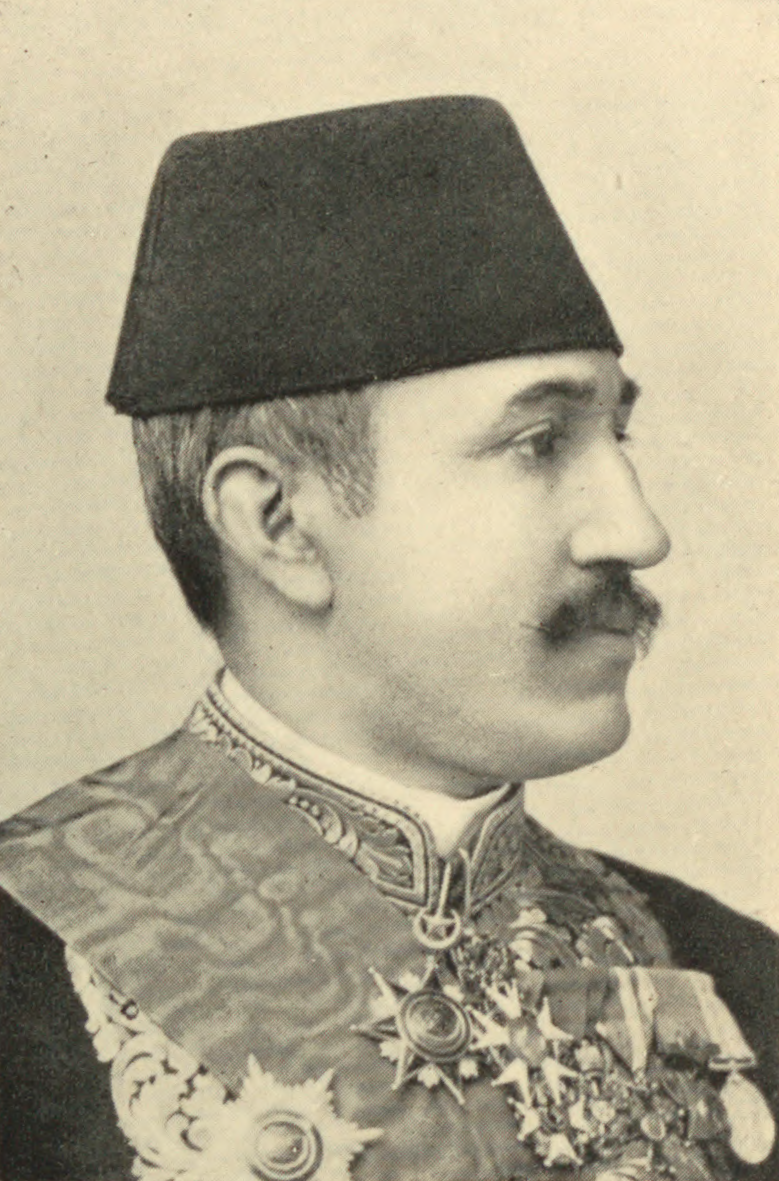
Ahmad Mazlum Pasha

Ahmad Mazlum (1858–1949) was an Egyptian judge, cabinet minister, and parliamentary leader.

== Early life ==
Mazlum was born in Cairo, Egypt, into a family of Turkish origin. He was educated in Egypt and also studied economics in England.

== Career ==
Mazlum was a master of ceremonies under Khedive Ismail, and later served as a judge and public prosecutor in the National Courts. He also served as a chancellor of the National Court of Appeals.

During the premiership of Mustafa Fahmi, Mazlum became the Minister of Justice and then the Minister of Finance. He was also later the awqaf Minister in the cabinet of Muhammad Said.

By 1913 he was elected to the Legislative Assembly and was named its president.

== Portrait ==
A portrait of Mazlum, painted by Mahmud Said, is displayed in Cairo's Modern Art Museum.

== Personal life and death ==
He was related to Muhammad Said through marriage.

Mazlum died on 9 May 1928.
