= The Dawn of the Egyptian Novel =

Book by Yahya Haqqi

The Dawn of the Egyptian novel is a book written by the Egyptian novelist and writer Yahya Haqqi (17 January 1905 – 9 December 1992).

== Content ==
The Dawn of the Egyptian Novel
- Author: Yahya Haqqi
- Language: Arabic
- Publication date: 1960, 1975

In the book “The Dawn of the Egyptian novel”, Yahya Haqqi chronicles modern Egyptian anecdotal art, writing about the novel "Zainab" by Mohammed Hussein Heikal and writes about Muhammad Taimur, Mahmud Tahir Lashin, Issa Obeid and Tawfiq al-Hakim. He also discusses Mahmud Tahir Haqqi’s novel "The Virgin of Dunshawayh" (original title:ʿḏrāʾ dnšwy) as well as "The Pen Paintings" as a tribute to the art of the short story, and among those who wrote "Pen paintings". There is not yet an English translation of this book (although many studies and articles refer to it), but in 2023 it was translated into Italian by Caterina Pinto for Istituto per l'Oriente Carlo Alfonso Nallino (Ipocan).
