= Muhammad Taymur =

Egyptian writer

- محمد تيمور
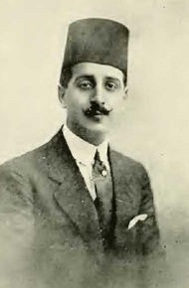
- Born: 1892; Cairo, Khedivate of Egypt
- Died: February 24, 1921 (aged 28–29); Cairo
- Occupation: Writer
- Relatives: Ahmed Taymour (father); Mahmud Taymur (brother); Aisha Taymur (aunt)
- Writing career
- Period: 1913–1921

Muhammad Taymur (1892 – February 24, 1921) was an Egyptian playwright, fiction writer, poet, and literary critic. He wrote the first short story in Arabic literature, Fi al-Qitar ("On the Train"), in the early 20th century. He was a member of Al-Madrasa al-Ḥadītha literary movement.

His father is writer and historian Ahmed Taymour, his younger brother is writer Mahmud Taymur, and his aunt is poet and social activist Aisha Taymur.

He moved to Berlin to study medicine, and then Paris to study law, but returned to Egypt with the outbreak of World War I in 1914.

His works were published posthumously in four volumes by his brother.

== See also ==
- Media related to Muhammad Taymur at Wikimedia Commons
