= Al Majalla (magazine) =

Egyptian cultural magazine (1952–1971)

- Editor-in-chief: Mohamed Awad; Yahya Haqqi
- Categories: Cultural magazine
- Founder: Egyptian Ministry of Culture
- Founded: 1957
- Final issue: 1971
- Country: Egypt
- Based in: Cairo
- Language: Arabic

Al Majalla (Arabic: The Journal) was an Arabic language cultural magazine headquartered in Cairo, Egypt. The magazine was started by the Ministry of Culture in 1957 and published until 1971. Its subtitle was Sijil al-Thaqafa al-Rai‘a (Arabic: a Record of High Culture).

== History and profile ==
Al Majalla was launched by the Ministry of Culture in 1957 when the ministry was also established. The founding editor was Mohamed Awad. The magazine became a popular publication shortly after its start. Tharwat Okasha, the minister of culture, appointed Yahya Haqqi, a well-known writer, editor-in-chief of the magazine in 1962. Haqqi modified the function of the magazine from being an official organ of the ministry to being a platform for young Egyptian writers and cultural figures. The magazine frequently published translations of the Vietnamese literary work.

In 1971 Haqqi was removed from the editorship, and Al Majalla was closed down by a decree of the President Anwar Sadat. Mohammed Saad of Ahram Online regards this decree as the massacre of the magazines.

In 2012 a cultural magazine with the same name was established in Cairo.
