= Gianaclis =

Janaklis جناكليس
- Location in Egypt
- Coordinates: 31.24282°N 29.968715°E
- Country: Egypt
- Governorate: Alexandria
- City: Alexandria
- Time zone: UTC+2 (EST)

Gianaclis (Arabic: جناكليس) is a neighbourhood in Alexandria, Egypt. It is named after the Greek-Egyptian businessman Nestor Gianaclis who established the Gianaclis Vineyards in Alexandria and, along with the Kyriazi Freres, founded the Egyptian cigarette industry.

== Notable people from Gianaclis ==
- Queen Farida of Egypt
- Mahmoud Sa'id, Egyptian artist

== See also ==
- Neighborhoods in Alexandria
