= Turks in Egypt =

Ethnic group in Egypt

Turks in Egypt/Egyptian Turks أتراك مصر Mısır Türkleri
Total population
- Various estimates: 100,000-1,500,000

Regions with significant populations
- Lower Egypt Fayoum Sinai Peninsula

Languages
- Turkish; Egyptian Arabic

Religion
- Sunni Islam

Related ethnic groups
- Turks in Tunisia; Iraqi Turkmen; Syrian Turkmen

The Turks in Egypt, also referred to as Egyptian Turks, Turkish-Egyptians and Turco-Egyptians (Arabic: أتراك مصر Turkish: Mısır Türkleri) are Egyptian citizens of partial or full Turkish ancestry, who are the descendants of settlers that arrived in the region during the rule of several Turkic dynasties, including: the Tulunid (868–905), Ikhshidid (935–969), Mamluk (1250–1517), and Ottoman (1517–1867 and 1867–1914) eras. Today their descendants continue to live in Egypt and still identify as Egyptians of Turkish or mixed origin, though they are also fully integrated in Egyptian society.

== History ==
=== Ottoman era ===
During the four centuries of Ottoman rule, Turkish settlers arrived predominately from Anatolia; however, many also arrived from the Ottoman Isles (such as the Aegean islands, Crete, and Cyprus), as well as from prominent Ottoman cities (such as Istanbul, Algiers, and Tunis).

In 1833 one estimate claimed that the Turkish population in Egypt was 30,000; however, in 1835, the Missionary Herald newspaper claimed that the population [of Ottoman Egypt] is of a mixed character, the great mass being Arabic language speaking Muslims, and a minority of Turkish speakers who belonged to the Ottoman ruling-class. Similarly, in 1840, The Saturday Magazine series claimed that Egypt's population was only about two million and a half, the majority of whom are of Arabic speaking masses and Ottoman ruling class. This study is widely discredited and has no scientific basis.

By 1878 the Karl Baedeker Firm published a census stating that the population of Egypt "hardly exceeds 5 millions" and that the population of Turkish origin numbered barely 100,000 (accounting to approximately 2% of the population), mainly concentrated to the towns.

Foreign-born Ottomans in Egypt: [1907 - 1917] census
Ethnic group	1907 census	1917 census
Turks	27,591	8,471
Arabs	440	386
Armenians	7,747	7,760
Greeks	N/A	4,258
Jews	N/A	1,243
Syrians (including Arabs, Turkmen, Kurds etc.)	33,947	7,728
Other races	951	N/A
Total Foreign-born	69,725	30,797

=== Post-Ottoman era ===
Under the terms of the 1919 Treaty of Versailles, Article 102, former Ottoman (Turkish) subjects resident in Egypt were denaturalized by Turkey and automatically acquired Egyptian nationality unless they were absent from the territory on 18 December 1914.

Prior to the Egyptian revolution in 1919, the ruling elite were mainly Turkish, or of Turkish descent, which was part of the heritage from the Ottoman rule of Egypt. The ethnic affiliation in Egypt at this time was still blurry; however, Amal Talaat Abdelrazek describes the Turkish society in Egypt with the following words:

"This interiorized rejection of things local and Arabic in part derives from the fact that the ruling and upper classes in the years before the revolution were mainly Turkish, or of Turkish descent, part of the heritage from the Ottoman rule in Egypt. If one was not really Western, but belonged to the elite, one was Turkish. Only the masses, the country folk, were quite simply Egyptian in the first place, and possibly Arabs secondarily."

== Culture ==
=== Language ===
During the Ottoman rule of Egypt, the region was ruled directly by Turkish-speaking elites. Consequently, the lexical Turkish influence of Egyptian Arabic has been clearer and more consistent than in Levantine Arabic, especially the formal terms like Pasha and Bek which are still used till today in daily conversations. Today, many Turkish lexical items (and Persian borrowings through Turkish) have been firmly integrated into Egyptian Arabic.

== Population ==
According to an article by Gamal Nkrumah in the Egyptian Al-Ahram Weekly, estimates regarding the population of the Turkish minority vary considerably, ranging from 100,000 to 1,500,000. However, one estimate in 1971 suggested that the population of Cretan Turks alone numbered 100,000 in Egypt. Moreover, another estimate in 1993 claimed that the Turkish minority in Egypt numbered 1.5 million at the time.

== See also ==
- List of Egyptian people of Turkish descent
- Yeghen family
- History of Ottoman Egypt
- Egypt in the Middle Ages
- Turkish minorities in the former Ottoman Empire
  - Turks in the Arab world
  - Iraqi Turkmens
  - Syrian Turkmens
  - Turks in Algeria
  - Turks in Lebanon
  - Turks in Tunisia
- Oghuz Turks
- Egypt–Turkey relations

== Bibliography ==
- Abdelrazek, Amal Talaat (2007), Contemporary Arab American women writers: hyphenated identities and border crossings, Cambria Press, ISBN 978-1-934043-71-4
- Akar, Metin (1993), "Fas Arapçasında Osmanlı Türkçesinden Alınmış Kelimeler", Türklük Araştırmaları Dergisi, 7: 91–110
- Armes, Roy (2008), Dictionnaire des cinéastes africains de long métrage, KARTHALA Editions, ISBN 978-2-84586-958-5
- Badawī, Muḥammad Muṣṭafá (1975), A critical introduction to modern Arabic poetry, Cambridge University Press, ISBN 0-521-29023-6
- Badran, Margot (1996), Feminists, Islam, and nation: gender and the making of modern Egypt, Princeton University Press, p. 97, ISBN 0-691-02605-X
- Baedeker, Karl (2000), Egypt, Elibron, ISBN 1-4021-9705-5
- Baring, Evelyn (2005), Modern Egypt. Volume 2, Elibron, ISBN 1-4021-7830-1
- Brugman, J. (1984), An introduction to the history of modern Arabic literature in Egypt, BRILL, p. 263, ISBN 90-04-07172-5
- Carstens, Patrick Richard (2014), The Encyclopædia of Egypt during the Reign of the Mehemet Ali Dynasty 1798-1952: The People, Places and Events that Shaped Nineteenth Century Egypt and its Sphere of Influence, Friesen Press, ISBN 978-1460248997
- Asbridge, Thomas (2010). The Crusades: The War for the Holy Land. Simon and Schuster. ISBN 9781849837705.
- Clifford, Winslow William (2013). Conermann, Stephan (ed.). State Formation and the Structure of Politics in Mamluk Syro-Egypt, 648-741 A.H./1250-1340 C.E. Bonn University Press. ISBN 9783847100911.
- Goldschmidt, Arthur (2000), Biographical dictionary of modern Egypt, Lynne Rienner Publishers, ISBN 1-55587-229-8
- Iggers, Georg G.; Wang, Q. Edward; Mukherjee, Supriya (2008), A global history of modern historiography, Pearson Education, p. 196, ISBN 978-0-582-09606-6
- Johnson, Amy J. (2004), Reconstructing rural Egypt: Ahmed Hussein and the history of Egyptian development, Syracuse University Press, p. 1, ISBN 0-8156-3014-X
- Jongerden, Joost (2007), The settlement issue in Turkey and the Kurds: an analysis of spatial policies, modernity and war, BRILL, p. 193, ISBN 978-90-04-15557-2
- Lababidi, Lesley Kitchen (2008), Cairo's street stories: exploring the city's statues, squares, bridges, gardens, and sidewalk cafés, American University in Cairo Press, ISBN 978-977-416-153-7
- Manzalaoui, Mahmoud (1986), Arabic short stories, 1945-1965, American University in Cairo Press, p. 193, ISBN 977-424-121-5
- Moosa, Matti (1997), The origins of modern Arabic fiction, Lynne Rienner Publishers, p. 109, ISBN 0-89410-684-8
- Nelson, Cynthia (1996), Doria Shafik, Egyptian feminist: a woman apart, American Univ in Cairo Press, p. 27, ISBN 977-424-413-3
- Olaussen, Maria; Angelfors, Christina (2009), Africa writing Europe: opposition, juxtaposition, entanglement, Rodopi, ISBN 978-90-420-2593-6
