= Eugénie Le Brun =

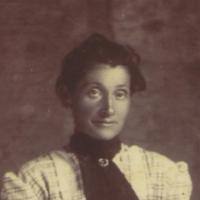
Eugénie Le Brun

Eugénie Le Brun also known as Madame Rushdi (died October 16, 1908) was a French-born early Egyptian feminist intellectual, influential salon host, and close friend of Huda Sha'arawi.

== Early life and marriage ==
Le Brun was born in France and raised in an upper-middle-class family. She was well educated and actively participated in elite French intellectual life. As the daughter of a middle-class family with little relative financial security, Le Brun's future place within society would be dictated completely by the position of her future husband.

Le Brun met a prominent Egyptian landowner, Husayn Rushdi Pasha during the latter's time in France. Rushdi was born in a wealthy family of Turkish descent in Cairo and sent abroad for education in Geneva and later France. Le Brun married Rushdi who would eventually become the Egyptian Prime Minister from 1914-1917. Upon Rushdi completing his education in France, Le Brun returned with him to Cairo in 1892 to fulfill a string of prominent positions within the colonial Egyptian government.

== Feminism ==
After moving to Cairo and undertaking the required religious study, Le Brun converted to Islam. She argued that through careful investigation of the Quran and contrary to popular western belief, Islam could be a liberalizing force and afforded women many important rights. As such, she took an interest in Islamic justice for women and often attended Islamic court proceedings. The perceived abuses of women's marital rights that Le Brun witnessed in judge decisions would later be the main focus of her book, Harem et les Musulmanes. She attempted to stress the distinction between Islam as a religion and the "distortions that the corrupt religious establishments and powerful figures had introduced to it".

e) veiling and the seclusion of women were not required by Islam. Having experienced the harem lifestyle upon moving to Cairo, Le Brun believed western officials’ focus on ending the practice were misguided and instead was indicative of the larger social system on excluding upper-class women from the public sphere. In Harem et les Musulmanes, Le Brun argued that western policy "mystifies what was simply the portion of the house where women and children conducted their daily lives…[women] negotiated places for themselves among the choices made available to them in ways tempered by their degree of access to resources and privileges".

Le Brun believed the best way to negotiate the separation between the public and private sphere was through intellectual activities. As such, she hosted the leading weekly women's salon in her home in Egypt beginning in the mid 1890s. While primarily focused on literary discourse, the salon topics frequently discussed intense political subjects. On one occasion, Le Brun remarked the topics ranged from "feminism, cinematographe, the naiveté of Americans, the Boxer Rebellion, the interpretation of dreams, to Karl Marx".

In addition to weekly salon gatherings, Le Brun also advocated for the education of women. She contended that while a "woman’s first duty is to her family, she can perform this duty better if she is well-educated". In Les Répudiées, Le Brun advocated for the need for education of poor women as well as the elites. Specifically, Le Brun studied the lives of women who serve as self-supporting heads of household due to the absence of the husband. After becoming widows or simply abandoned by their husbands, Le Brun found that most poor women did not have a social network to fall back on and must work instead. She argued that it was society's moral duty to provide all women with education.

== Relationship with Huda Sha’arawi ==
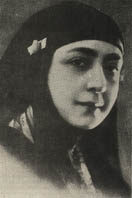
Huda Sha`arawi. before removing her traditional apostolnik

Le Brun maintained a close friendship with Egyptian feminist and nationalist leader Huda Sha'arawi. Sha’arawi used to attend the salons hosted by Le Brun in the 1880s where social practices such as veiling were discussed. Le Brun convinced Sha'arawi that the veil stood in the way of Egyptian women's advancement and this led Sha'arawi's public unveiling later. Sha’arawi also viewed Le Brun as an invaluable mentor with a long-lasting effect on her intellectual development and influenced by her that, after Le Brun's death in 1908, Sha’arawi wrote in her memoir: "I had come to rely heavily upon her good counsel but even after her death I felt her spirit light the way before me. When I was about to embark on something, I often paused to ask myself what she would think, and if I sensed her approval I would proceed".

== Books ==
Le Brun wrote many books and letters throughout her lifetime. The following two were published under the pseudonym "Mme. Rachid-Pacha Niya Salima" in Paris:

- Rachid-Pacha Niya Salima (1902). Harem et les Musulmanes. F. Juven. ISBN 0253313414.
- Rachid-Pacha Niya Salima (1908). Les Repudiees. Société d'Edition et de Publications. OCLC 492718089.

== See also ==
- Women's literary salons and societies in the Arab World
- List of women's rights activists
- Timeline of first women's suffrage in majority-Muslim countries
- Timeline of women's rights (other than voting)
- Timeline of women's suffrage
