= Nahed Rashad =

Nahed Rashad ناهد رشاد
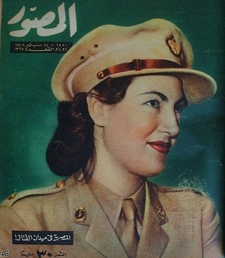
- Nahed Rashad on Al-Musawar magazine cover
- Born: Nahed Shawqi Bakir; 1917; Helwan, Cairo, Kingdom of Egypt
- Died: 1985 (aged 67–68)
- Citizenship: Egyptian
- Spouse: Yousef Rashad (m. 1938; died 1971)
- Children: Alia Rashad; Mahmoud Rashad; Shawqi Rashad
- Parents: Dr.Shawqi Bakir (father); Alfet Hanim Esmat (mother)

Nahed Rashad (born Nahed Shawqi Bakir Arabic: ناهد شوقي بكير; 1917 – 1985) was an influential figure during the kingdom of Egypt who became the chief lady-in-waiting and was a member of Iron guard.

== Early life ==
Nahed was born in the city of Helwan in 1917. Her father is Dr. Shawqi Bakir, who worked as a professor at the College of Science. Her mother and aunt have been the ladies-in-waiting of Melek Tourhan since 1915. Nahed Rashad often played with Sultan Hussein's daughters in the royal palace. In 1938, Nahed married Yousef Rashad, the son of a former governor and a royal naval physician. They had one daughter and two sons: Alia, Shawqi and Mahmoud.

== Career ==
=== Lady-in-waiting ===
In 1945 King Farouk made Nahed the lady-in-waiting of Princess Fawzia. He later promoted Nahed to the rank of Chief lady-in-waiting. Nahed accompanied princess Fawzia in all of the events and parties she attended. Nahed also became the lady-in-waiting for Princess Faiza. After the marriage of Fawzia to Ismail chirine, Nahed Rashad remained as a lady-in-waiting in the palace for no queen. During that time she acted as an assistant to king Farouk.

=== Iron guard ===
When the Iron guard started recruiting women, Nahed Rashad became the supervisor over them. She became an important member of the Iron guard and had high influence over it.

=== 1948 Palestine war ===
Nahed Rashad volunteered in the 1948 Palestine war. She received the major rank in the Egyptian military. Al-Musawar magazine published her photo in military uniform on September 24, 1948, under the title: “The Egyptian Woman in the Battlefield.” During her time as a volunteer in Palestine war, she started recruiting new members in the Iron Guard.

== Later life and death ==
After 1952 revolution, Nahed Rashad lived a simple life in Hurghada, where she was a housewife and enjoyed cooking fish. After Dr. Youssef Rashad's death in 1971, she moved to an apartment in Dokki, and her eldest son Mahmoud Rashad lived with her.

Nahed contacted Hediya Hanem Barakat, daughter of Bahey El Din Barakat Pasha, the owner of the first home for the elderly in Egypt. She moved there in the early eighties. Nahed later died in 1985.

== Popular culture ==
=== Books and publisments ===
- The book "El Maraa alty Hazt Arsh Misr" (The woman who shook the throne of Egypt) by Rashed Kamel, spoke about the details of the life of Nahed Rashad.
- The book "Nahed wa El melik Farouk" (Nahed and King Farouk) by Hanafi El-Mehalawy spoke about the life and Controversy surrounding Nahed Rashad.

=== Television and cinema ===
- The film titled "Emraa Hazt Arsh Misr" (A Woman Who Shook the Throne of Egypt) in 1995 was based on her. Nahed Rashad was played by the actress Nadia El Gendy.
- Kariokka series in 2012, about the life story of the artist Tahia Kariokka, starring Wafaa Amer. Nahed Rashad role was played by the actress Rasha Sami.
- The series "'Awraq Miseria" (Egyptian Papers), Part 2, 2002, Nahed Rashad role was played by the actress Ghada Abdel Razek.

== See also ==
- Princess Faika of Egypt
- Farida of Egypt
