= Al-Fajr (literary magazine) =

Egyptian magazine (1925–1927)

- Categories: Literary
- Frequency: Weekly
- First issue: 8 January 1925
- Final issue: 31 January 1927
- Country: Egypt
- Based in: Cairo
- Language: Arabic

The Egyptian literary magazine al-Fajr (Arabic: الفجر; English: The Dawn) was published weekly in Cairo between 8 January 1925 and 31 January 1927. Ahmed Khairi Sa'id was editor-in-chief.

A group of young writers of the al-Madrasa al-Haditha ("Modernist School"), including Mahmoud Taymour (1894 -1973), Mahmoud Tahir Laasheen (1894-1954), Yahya Haqqi (1905-1993) and Husayn Fawzy (1900-1988), are considered to be the founders of the magazine. Some of them increased their popularity inside and outside of Egypt by publishing their works in al-Fajr.

Generally, the declared aim of the journal was reaching the renaissance of the Egyptian literary scene and in particular "intellectual independence".
