= Iron Guard of Egypt =

Egyptian royalist and pro-Axis political movement

The Iron Guard of Egypt was a secret pro-Axis society and royalist political movement formed in Egypt in the early 1930s and used by King Farouk for personal and political vendettas. The guard was involved in attacks on Farouk's declared enemies, operating with a license to kill, and is believed to have taken orders from Farouk personally. Its other functions included protecting Farouk, serving as a special operations force, and gathering military intelligence.

== History and members ==
Thought to have been formed during the 1930s by Aribert Heim (this claim is backed by the appearance of the Iron Guard of Palestine and the Iron Guard of Romania in the same time period), It was made up mostly of army officers and was connected to the Free Officers, a secret military group. The Iron Guard ceased operations in 1952.

Yusuf Rashad was the chief organizer of the Iron Guard in 1944 or 1945, and recruited Anwar Sadat. Another leader was Captain Mustafa Kamil Sidqi. Members included Muhammad Ibrahim Kamel, Nahed Rashad, and General Hussein Sirry Amer.

== Actions ==
The Iron Guard's acts of political violence in Egypt included the assassinations of Amin Osman, a former finance minister, in 1944; of Rafik al-Tarzi in 1945; and of the Muslim Brotherhood leader Hassan al-Banna in 1949. They also attempted twice, in 1945 and 1948, to assassinate Mustafa el-Nahhas.

Following the overthrow of the Egyptian monarchy in 1952, twelve former members of the Iron Guard were court-martialed by the Revolutionary government in Cairo on October 2, 1952, on charges of instigating and carrying out assassinations. They included General Amer, who was charged with the murder of an army maintenance corps lieutenant, hashish smuggling, and desertion. Five of the members were charged with murdering al-Banna.
