= Princess Fawzia of Egypt (born 1940) =

Fawzia
- Princess of Egypt
- Born: 7 April 1940; Abdeen Palace, Cairo, Egypt
- Died: 27 January 2005 (aged 64); Lausanne, Switzerland
- Burial: 30 January 2005; Al-Rifa'i Mosque, Cairo, Egypt
- House: House of Muhammad Ali (by birth)
- Father: Farouk I
- Mother: Safinaz Zulficar
- Religion: Sunni Islam
- Occupation: Simultaneous interpreter

Princess Fawzia (Arabic: الأميرة فوزية; 7 April 1940 – 27 January 2005) was the second daughter of King Farouk I of Egypt from his first wife Queen Farida.

== Early life and education ==
Fawzia was born on 7 April 1940 in Abdeen Palace in Cairo. She was named after her paternal aunt, who was reportedly King Farouk's favourite sister. She was 12 years old when the July 1952 Revolution forced her father's abdication and departure from Egypt. Along with her two sisters, she travelled with King Farouk on his last voyage out of Egypt, and lived with him in exile in Rome. Two years later, the three young princesses were sent to a Swiss boarding school by the king. Their mother Queen Farida stayed in Egypt, and joined her daughters in Switzerland only a decade after the revolution.

Fawzia was an accomplished athlete. She took flying lessons and obtained a pilot's licence. A professional sailor, she managed to reach the rank of captain, and was also a passionate scuba diver. She was multilingual in French, English, Italian, Spanish and Arabic, and passed an exam which qualified her to work as a simultaneous interpreter in Switzerland. She had not inherited a significant sum and relied on her interpreting job to earn a living. Although she had lost her royal status, Fawzia remained strongly attached to her homeland, and visited Egypt as often as she could. Unlike her two sisters she never married.

== Illness and death ==
In 1995, Fawzia was diagnosed with multiple sclerosis, which resulted in significant mobility limitations and the need for constant care. She died in Lausanne on 27 January 2005 at the age of 64. Her body was transported to Cairo, where she was interred at Al-Rifa'i Mosque on 30 January, following the tradition for members of the Egyptian royal family.

== Ancestors ==
Ancestors of Princess Fawzia of Egypt (born 1940)

16. Ibrahim Pasha, Viceroy of Egypt
8. Isma'il Pasha, Khedive of Egypt
17. Khushiyar Kadin
4. Fuad I, King of Egypt
9. Ferial Kadin
2. Farouk I, King of Egypt
10. Abdel Rahim Sabri Pasha, Governor of Cairo
5. Nazli Sabri
22. Muhammad Sharif Pasha, Prime Minister of Egypt
11. Tewfika Hanem
23. Nazli El-Fransawi
1. Princess Fawzia of Egypt
24. Youssef Bey Rasmi
12. Ali Zulficar Pasha, Governor of Cairo
6. Youssef Zulficar Pasha
26. Muhammad Mohyi Pasha
13. Aziza Hanem
3. Safinaz Zulficar (Queen Farida)
14. Muhammad Sa'id Pasha, Prime Minister of Egypt
7. Zeinab Hanem
