= Nihal Mazloum =

Egyptian-Canadian artist (born 1951)

Nihal Mazloum (born January 23, 1951) is a Paris-born Egyptian-Canadian artist.

== Early life ==
Mazloum was born in Paris, France, in 1951 into an affluent family of Turkish-Egyptian ancestry.

She grew up in Cairo and received her bachelor's degree in anthropology from The American University in Cairo; thereafter, she left Egypt to study ethnology in Paris. Mazloum remained in France for seven years and then immigrated to Canada in 1978.

== Career ==
During her time in Paris, Mazloum underwent advanced training in metalwork and, by 1979, she opened a workshop in Montreal, Canada, where she began to display her jewellery.

Mazloum has participated in various craft shows, as well as exhibitions in Canada and the United States. Several of her jewellery pieces are displayed in the Canadian Museum of Civilization's collection.

== Personal life ==
She lives in Montreal.
