= Princess Fadia of Egypt =

Egyptian princess (1943–2002)

Princess Fadia
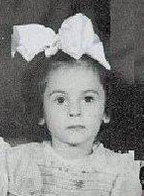
- Born: 15 December 1943; Abdeen Palace, Kingdom of Egypt
- Died: 28 December 2002 (aged 59); Lausanne, Switzerland
- Burial: Rifai Mosque
- Spouse: Pierre Alexeievich Orloff (m. 1965)
- Issue: Michel-Shamil Orloff; Alexander-Ali Orloff
- Father: Farouk of Egypt
- Mother: Safinaz Zulfikar

Princess Fadia (Arabic: الأميرة فادية; 15 December 1943 – 28 December 2002) was born at the Abdeen Palace in Cairo. She was the youngest daughter of the late Former King Farouk of Egypt and his first wife, the Queen Farida. After her father was deposed during the Egyptian Revolution of 1952, the Princess lived in Italy for two years. She and her sisters were then sent to live in Switzerland, to attend boarding school. There, the Princess studied painting, became an accomplished equestrian and met her future husband. The couple bred and trained racehorses, and Fadia worked as a translator for the Swiss Ministry of Tourism.

== Early life ==
Fadia was born at the Abdeen Palace in Cairo. She was the youngest daughter of the late Former King Farouk of Egypt and his first wife, the Queen Farida. After her father was deposed during the Egyptian Revolution of 1952, the Princess lived in Italy for two years. She and her sisters were then sent to live in Switzerland, to attend boarding school. There, the Princess studied painting, became an accomplished equestrian and met her future husband.

== Marriage ==
On 17 February 1965, Fadia married Prince Pierre Alexeievich Orloff (born 13 December 1938), a geologist and descendant of Orlov family, at the Kensington Registry Office, in London. He converted to Islam, taking the name Sa'id Orloff. They had two sons, Michel-Shamil (born 2 September 1966) and Alexander-Ali (born 30 July 1969). Fadia and her husband owned and trained racehorses until an accident made it harder for Sa'id to care for them. The Princess worked as a translator for the Swiss Ministry of Tourism, being fluent in French, Arabic, English, Italian and Spanish.

== Death ==
Fadia died suddenly in Lausanne, Switzerland, on 28 December 2002 at the age of 59, and was buried in the Al-Rifa'i Mosque in Cairo, Egypt.

== Ancestors ==
Ancestors of Princess Fadia of Egypt

16. Ibrahim Pasha, Viceroy of Egypt
8. Isma'il Pasha, Khedive of Egypt
17. Khushiyar Kadin
4. Fuad I, King of Egypt
9. Ferial Kadin
2. Farouk I, King of Egypt
10. Abdel Rahim Sabri Pasha, Governor of Cairo
5. Nazli Sabri
22. Muhammad Sharif Pasha, Prime Minister of Egypt
11. Tewfika Hanem
23. Nazli El-Fransawi
1. Princess Fadia of Egypt
24. Youssef Bey Rasmi
12. Ali Zulficar Pasha, Governor of Cairo
6. Youssef Zulficar Pasha
26. Muhammad Mohyi Pasha
13. Aziza Hanem
3. Safinaz Zulficar (Queen Farida)
14. Muhammad Sa'id Pasha, Prime Minister of Egypt
7. Zeinab Hanem
