= Al-Madrasa al-Ḥadītha =

Arabic literature movement

Al-Madrasa al-Ḥadītha (Arabic: المدرسة الحديثة, lit. 'The Modern School' or 'The New School') was a modernist movement in Arabic literature that began in 1917 in Egypt. The movement is associated with the development of the short story in the earlier periods of modern Arabic literature. Driven by the concept of concept of al-hadam wal-binā' (الهدم والبناء lit. 'destruction and construction'), the members of Al-Madrasa al-Ḥadītha were interested in searching for a specifically Egyptian literature and for the Egyptian identity, and in "establishing fiction as serious literature." Ahmed Khairi Sa'id edited the movement's journal: Al-Fajr: Sahifat al-Hadam wal-Bina' (الفجر: صحيفة الهدم والبناء lit. 'The Dawn: Journal of Destruction and Construction'), published 1925–1927.

== Historical context ==
In the aftermath of World War I and the dissolution and partition of the Ottoman Empire, European imperial powers—particularly Britain and France—moved in to the region under the mandate system of the Covenant of the League of Nations. Egypt, which was already occupied by the British, was made a British protectorate in 1914, leading to nationalist feeling among the Egyptians that erupted in the Revolution of 1919.

The movement of Al-Madrasa al-Ḥadītha is situated in the context of this historical moment: when Arab countries were trying to liberate themselves from colonialism and foreign domination and attain statehood. There were also movements toward achieving "progress and modernity"—or, as some saw it, westernization—which "entailed a critical and at times rejectionist stance to traditional values."

== Members ==
Its members included Ahmed Khairi Sa'id, Hussein Fawzi, Muhammad Taymur, and Mahmud Tahir Lashin.

Other figures associated with Al-Madrasa al-Ḥadītha include Ibrahim al-Masri, Zaki Tulimat, Hassan Mahmud, Yahya Haqqi, Muhammad Kamil Hajjaj, Zakaria Mahran, Sayed Darwish, Ahmed Allam, Muhammad Rashid, and Fa'iq Riad.

== Influences ==
The writers of Al-Madrasa al-Ḥadītha were profoundly influenced by pre-revolutionary Russian literature, especially the works of Alexander Pushkin, Nikolai Gogol, Mikhail Lermontov, Ivan Turgenev, Fyodor Dostoevsky, Leo Tolstoy, Anton Chekhov, Maxim Gorky, and Boris Artzybasheff.

== Characteristics ==
The movement of Al-Madrasa al-Ḥadītha focused on the short story as the medium of choice. Its members tended to create stories with very few main characters, single plots, and simple situations. They sought to create realistic literature expressive of the Egyptian personality.

Ahmed Khairi Sa'id coined the slogan of Al-Madrasa al-Ḥadītha: "Long live authenticity, long live innovation. Long live renewal and reform." (فلتحيا الأصالة ، فليحيا الإبداع . فليحيا التجديد والإصلاح).

Associated with this movement and literature of the period were calls to use Egyptian vernacular Arabic, at least in dialogue.

== Legacy ==
Having established of a register of literary themes and developed characterization and dialogue, Al-Madrasa al-Ḥadītha made important contributions toward a tradition of modern fiction in Arabic literature.
