= Ahmed Taymour =

Egyptian writer and folklorist (1871–1930)

Ahmad Taymour Pasha
- أحمد تيمور
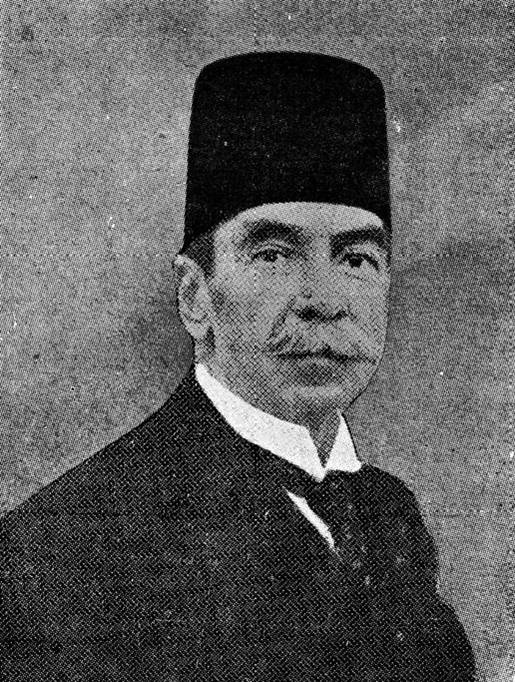
- Born: 6 November 1871; Cairo, Khedivate of Egypt
- Died: 25 August 1930 (aged 58); Cairo, Kingdom of Egypt
- Citizenship: / Khedivate of Egypt (1871–1914); Sultanate of Egypt (1914–1922); Kingdom of Egypt (1922–1930)
- Occupations: novelist, poet, writer, historian
- Children: Muhammad Taymur; Mahmud Taymur
- Relatives: Aisha Taymur (sister)

Ahmed Tawfik Taymour Pasha (1871–1930) was an Egyptian writer and historian. Taymour Pasha was born on 6 November 1871 in Cairo to a family of the Egyptian elite, his father Isma'il Taymur being of Kurdish origin and his mother of Turkish descent.

== Biography ==
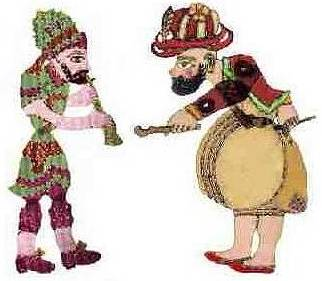
Hacivat (left) and Karagöz (right) in the Karagöz and Hacivat shadow play

Isma'il Taymur was a member of the royal entourage of the Muhammad Ali dynasty. The family's Turco-Circassian background was common among the Egyptian elite. Ahmed was educated by his elder sister, Aisha Taymur (1840–1902), a social activist, poet and novelist, active in the field of women's rights and her husband Muhammad Tawfiq. For some years, he was a student at the French School, but did not finish it with a degree. He stead home, where he learned Turkish and Persian. Before he reached his 20th birthday, he began his career as a writer. His house became a meeting place for many cultured men of his time who discussed literature, modern sciences and politics.

He was widowed early when his wife died of measles, and he left his family's house in Cairo to the nearby countryside. He focused on the education of his two sons, Muhammad Taymur and Mahmud Taymur who gained fame as a playwright and as a novelist, respectively. As a wealthy scholar and bibliophile Ahmed encouraged their literary pursuits.

Aisha had been influenced by the Ottoman age notion of 'pure aesthetics'. Ahmed's outlook was more on the search of a renewed Arab Golden Age, which was common among Egyptian intellectuals after the 1882 British Rule in Egypt. He however as a man of "many letters" pioneered the study of folklore and folkart, including the shadow play tradition, that had spread during the Ottoman period. In the 1920s he collaborated with Syrian journalist Muhib Al Din Al Khatib and funded his magazines, Al Zahra and Al Fath.

Taymour Pasha wrote among others, the following six books in Arabic:

- A'lam al-muhandisin fi 'l-Islam –Eminent Geometers, (Architects and Artists) in Islam (أعلام المهندسين في الإسلام)
- al-Amthal al-'ammiyya – Colloquial Proverbs (الأمثال العامية)
- al-Athar an-nabawiyya – The Prophet's Traces (الآثار النبوية)
- al-Hubb 'inda 'l-'Arab – Love in the Arab Culture (الحب عند العرب)
- Dabt al-a'lam – Survey of Eminent Personalities (ضبط الأعلام)
- La'b al-'Arab – Games of the Arabs (لعب العرب)

== Heritage and honors ==
He spent his large inherited fortune mostly on books and scripts. He bequeathed his library of more than 20,000 books to public use to the Egyptian National Library. It contains rare Arabic masterpieces. He was well versed in literature, linguistics and Arab history and a member of the prestigious Arab Academy of Damascus.
