= Riad Shehata =

Egyptian photographer (died 1942)

- رياض شحاتة
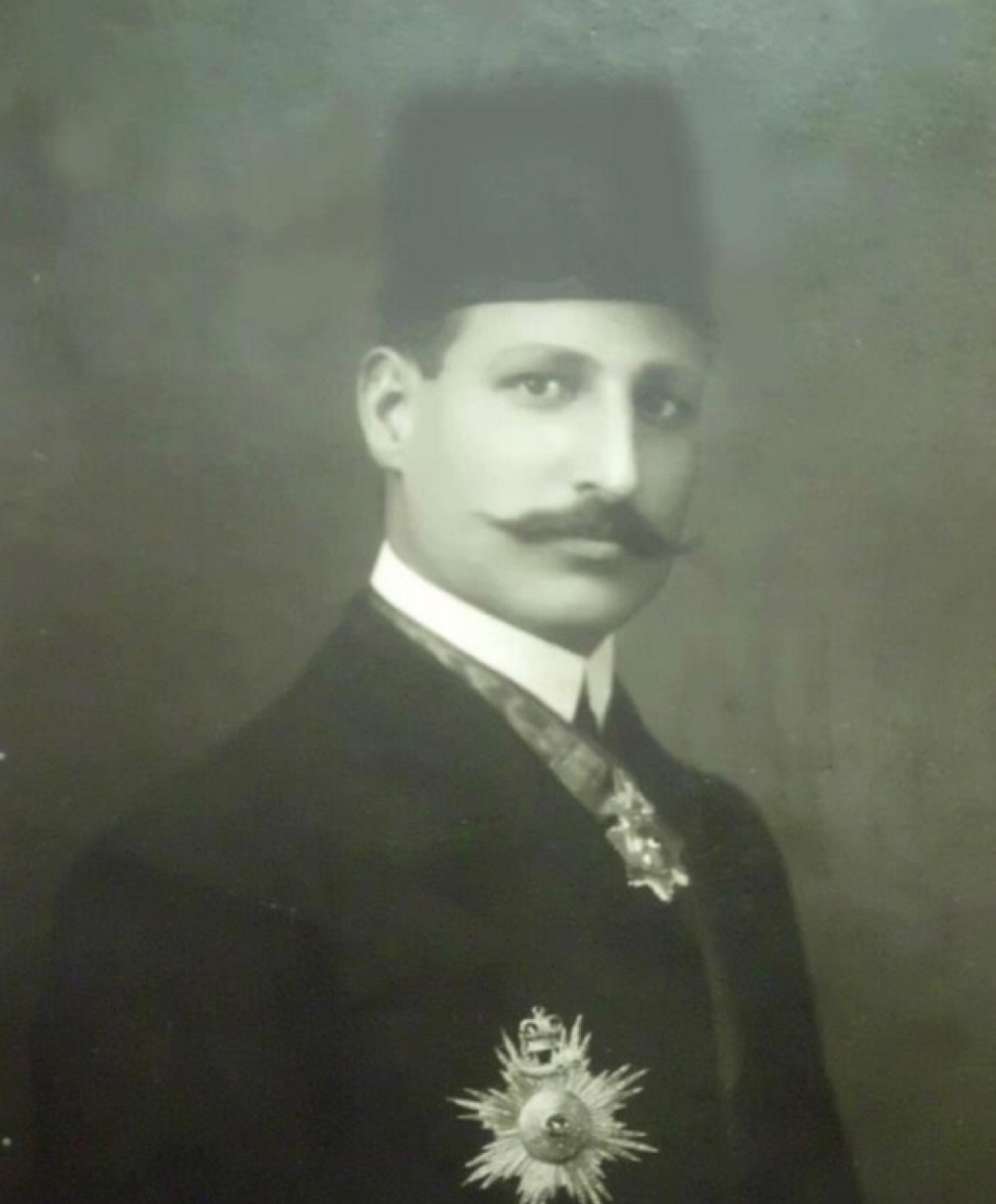
- Died: 1942
- Education: Studied photography in Frankfurt, Germany
- Occupations: Photographer; studio owner
- Known for: Official royal photographer of the King of Egypt; pioneering Egyptian photographer to travel abroad
- Notable work: Royal ceremonies, marriages, enthronements; documentation of Cairo Fire damage (1952)

Riad Shehata (Arabic: رياض شحاتة; died in 1942) was an Egyptian photographer.

He was the official photographer of the King of Egypt, in charge of photographing royal events such as marriages, enthronement ceremonies and formal parties. He was the first Egyptian photographer to travel abroad; he went to Frankfurt in Germany where he studied the art of photography extensively. He travelled around the world in order to take rare photographs. His studio was located in downtown Cairo's Opera Square. After his death in 1942, the studio remained open under the same name. The Riad Shehata Studio was notably charged by King Farouk with photographing in minute detail the extensive damage resulting from the devastating 1952 Cairo Fire. In 2003, 275 rare photographs from the Riad Shehata Studio were bought by a private collector from the photographer's family.

== Bibliography ==
- Fouad, Nadia (2003-01-01). "Sowar nādera men ḥayat al-malik Farouk". Al-Shabab (in Arabic) (306). Al-Ahram. Archived from the original on July 3, 2007.
