= Mahmud Tahir Haqqi =

Mahmud Tahir Haqqi (1884-1964) was an Egyptian writer and author of one of the earliest Egyptian novels. He was a founding member of the “New School” of Arabic writing.

== Personal life ==
Haqqi was from a family of Turkish origin. He was the uncle of Yahya Haqqi.
