= Hussein Roshdy Pasha =

Prime Minister of Egypt (1914–1919)

Hussein Roshdy Pasha GCMG
- حسين رشدي باشا
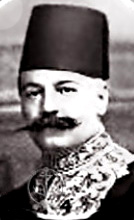
- Roshdy in 1914

11th Prime Minister of Egypt
- In office 5 April 1914 – 12 April 1919
- Monarchs: Abbas II; Hussein Kamel; Fuad I
- Preceded by: Mohamed Said Pasha
- Succeeded by: Mohamed Said Pasha

Personal details
- Born: 1863
- Died: 1928 (aged 64–65)
- Spouse: Eugenie Le Brun

Hussein Pasha Roshdy GCMG (1863–1928) (Arabic: حسين رشدي باشا) was an Egyptian political figure of Turkish origin who served as Prime Minister of Egypt between 1914 and 1919.

== Biography ==
Born in family origins of which are in Kavala. His great grandfather Topuzoglou (also pronounced as 'Tabuzoglu' which in Turkish means 'Son of Cannon' and indicates linear descent from janissary) who came with Muhammad Ali of Egypt and for his success against British invasion in Rosetta was appointed by him with governorship of Alexandria.

He served as the last Prime Minister of Khedivate of Egypt until 19 December 1914 and continued in his office as the first Prime Minister of Sultanate of Egypt. Under pressure from British authorities, Roshdy issued a "Decision of the Council of Ministers" which essentially declared war against the Central Powers in the First World War. He was later forced to resign for failing to resolve a strike by government officials demanding mandatory recognition of the Egyptian delegation by the cabinet and the withdrawal of British sentries and guards.

He was married to a daughter of the Ottoman sultan's chief of staff after a first marriage to Eugénie Le Brun. His sister was married to Hasan Pasha Mahmoud, dean of the Faculcy of Medicine at Cairo University and king's private physician.

== See also ==
- Eugénie Le Brun

Political offices
Preceded by Mohamed Said Pasha	Prime Minister of Egypt; 1914–1919	Succeeded by Mohamed Said Pasha
