= Aziza Shoukry Hussein =

Egyptian international civil servant (1919–2015)

- عزيزة شكري حسين
- Born: 30 May 1919; Zefta, Egypt
- Died: 19 January 2015 (aged 95)
- Other name: Aziza Shoukri Husayn
- Occupations: Social worker, feminist, diplomat
- Known for: President of the International Planned Parenthood Federation

Aziza Shukry Hussein, also spelt as Aziza Shoukri Husayn, (30 May 1919 – January 19, 2015) was an Egyptian social welfare expert and leading advocate of family planning. She was active in Egypt's feminist movement. In 1962 she became the first woman to represent Egypt at the United Nations, and she served on the United Nations Commission on the Status of Women for fifteen years. She was president of the International Planned Parenthood Federation from 1977 to 1983.

== Early life and education ==
Hussein was born in Zefta, the daughter of Sayed Shukri. Her father was an Egyptian gynecologist and her mother was of Turkish origin. She graduated from the American University in Cairo in 1942, with an undergraduate thesis was titled "The Prophet Mohamed's Role in Legal Reform."

== Career ==
Hussein was a member of the Cairo Women's Club, and established a nursery school in Sandyoun in 1955. She was active in Egypt's feminist movement, and an advocate for family planning. She founded the Planned Parenthood Association in Egypt, and was president of the International Planned Parenthood Federation from 1977 to 1983. She co-founded an organization to oppose female genital mutilation.

In 1962 Hussein became the first woman to represent Egypt at the United Nations. She was the first Arab woman to serve on the UN's Status of Women Commission, where she held a seat for fifteen years.

== Publications ==
- "The Role of Women in Social Reform in Egypt" (1953)
- Women in the Moslem World (1954)
- "Crossroads for Women at the UN" (2004)
- A Pilgrim's Soul: Memoirs (2013)

== Honors ==
She was awarded the Order of Virtues in 1955, by Gamal Abdel Nasser. In 1999 she received the Archon Award from Sigma Theta Tau International.

== Personal life ==
In 1947 she married the Egyptian diplomat Ahmed Hussein. She died in 2015, at the age of 95. Her papers are in the American University in Cairo Archives.
