= Mahmud Taymur =

Egyptian writer (1894–1973)

- محمود تيمور
- Born: June 16, 1894
- Died: August 25, 1973 (aged 79)
- Occupation: Writer
- Relatives: Ahmed Taymour (father); Muhammad Taymur (brother); Aisha Taymur (aunt)

Mahmud Taymur (16 June 1894–25 August 1973) was a fiction writer. He contributed to several publications.

== Biography ==
He was born in Cairo on 16 June 1894. into a family famous for literature. His father, Ahmed Taymour (1871-1930) was a well-known writer, who was known for his broad interests in Arab heritage, and he was a researcher in the arts of Arabic language, literature and history. Ahmed Taymur left a great library, which is "Timurid", which is considered an ammunition for researchers to date in the Egyptian Books House, including the anecdotes of books and manuscripts. His brother Muhammad Taymur wrote the first short story in Arabic literature. Mahmud Taymur was among the contributors of Al Katib Al Misri, a Cairo-based literary magazine which was launched in October 1945.
