= Aisha Taymur =

Egyptian social activist

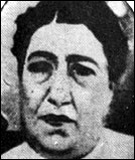
- Born: 1840; Cairo, Egypt
- Died: 1902 (aged 61–62)
- Occupations: Activist, writer
- Relatives: Ahmed Taymour (brother); Muhammad Taymur (nephew); Mahmud Taymur (nephew)

Aisha E'ismat Taymur (Arabic: عائشة عصمت تيمور or 'A'isha al-Taymuriyya عائشة التيمورية; 1840–1902) was an Egyptian social activist, poet, novelist, and feminist in the Ottoman era. She was active in the early 19th century in the field of women's rights. Her writings came out in a period of time where women in Egypt were realizing that they were being deprived of some of the rights that Islam granted them. Taymur was one of the earliest Arab women to be alive while her poetry and other writings were recognized and published in modern times.

In the assessment of Mervat Fayez Hatem,

Taymur used her work of fiction, social commentary and poetry to expand the definition of the nation-building process to include different social classes, ethnic groups and women of different generations and nationalisties. In this sincere effort, she was able to transform her very narrow social class rootes putting them into the service of the larger community. As such, she deserved, not just her poetry, the title of the "Finest of Her Class", which was one translation of the title of her poetry, Hilyat al-Tiraz.

== Personal life ==
=== Early life ===
Although Taymur was born into an Egyptian Turco-Kurdish royal family originally from Iraqi Kurdistan, she worked for those who did not have a voice. Her passion for women's rights in Egypt is why she is recognized as a pioneer in her field and culture.

Taymur was the daughter of Isma'il Taymur, a member of the Royal Turkish entourage. Taymur's mother was Circassian and a freed slave. Her father provided Taymur with an education and when he died she assumed the education of her brother, Ahmed Pasha Taymur. At age 14, Taymur married and moved to Istanbul.

=== Education ===
Against Taymur's mother's attempts to teach her embroidery, Taymur's father educated her in the Quran, Islamic Jurisprudence, Arabic, Turkish, and Persian. Her father also taught her composition, where she began her literary career with poetry in all three of her learned languages. Taymur was dedicated to education but because of gender at time in Egypt, she was restricted to only study in her home. Taymur voiced her anger with the segregation in poems when only 13. At age 14 she gave up her studies and writing when she married Mahmud Bey al-Islambuli. After the death of her daughter, father and husband, she returned to Egypt where she studied with female tutors on the subject of poetic composition.

=== Family ===
Taymur was born to a literary family; her brother Ahmed Pasha Taymur was a researcher and novelist. She also had two nephews: Muhammad Taymur, a playwright and Mahmud Taymur, a novelist.

The Taymur's believed Persian is the language of literature and refinement, whereas the Arabic language is used for religion and the people.

Taymur's father always wanted to provide his daughter with adequate education. Taymur got married in 1854 when she was 14 to Mahmud Bey al-Islambuli, a Turkish notable, and left with her husband to Istanbul. In 1873, Taymur's daughter, Tawhida, died from an unknown illness. Her father died in 1882, followed closely by the death of her husband in 1885, which prompted her to return to Egypt where she resumed her writing. Her poems mourning her daughter are considered the best in that genre in modern times.

== Activism ==
After the death of her husband and daughter, Taymur started on her writings advocating for women's rights. Her works came out at the time of a socioeconomic transformation of Egypt where women realized they were being deprived of the rights Islam gave them. Taymur is referenced as the "mother of Egyptian feminism."

She worked with other female intellectuals and activists to campaign for education, do charitable work, and challenge colonialism. This was the start of early growth for Egyptian feminism.

== Writing ==
Taymur wrote poetry in Arabic, Turkish and Persian. She arguably had a fundamental influence on the emergence of Arabic women's writing. Her 1892 sixteen-page booklet Mir'at al-ta'ammul fi al-umur (A Reflective Mirror on Some Matters or, more eloquently, The Mirror of Contemplation) reinterpreted the Koran to suggest that it was markedly less patriarchal in its requirements of Muslims than was traditionally thought.

In her writing, Taymur illustrated women's rights in Islam through allegorical narrative. Taymur made use of the word insan, meaning human being in Arabic, rather than using man. Taymur did this so that readers would consider her argument as a human being, and not based on her sex.

Taymur used imagery of female solitude to convey visibility of the life of a woman in Egypt. This offered readers a glimpse into the life of Muslim women.

Because Taymur was considered an elite Muslim in her society, she focused on going against her own status as a woman in a changing political and socioeconomic society throughout her writing.

=== Works ===
- Hilyat al-tiraz [Decorative Embroidery] (in Arabic). Cairo. 1884. Poetry.
- Nata'ij al-ahwal fi-l-aqwal wa-al-af'al [The Consequences of Circumstances in Words and Deeds] (in Arabic). Cairo. 1887.
- Mir'at al-ta'ammul fi-l-umur [The Mirror of Contemplation] (in Arabic). Cairo. 1892. Essay.
