= Youssef Zulficar Pasha =

Egyptian judge and diplomat (1866–1965)

Sahib us-Sa'ada Youssef Zulficar Pasha
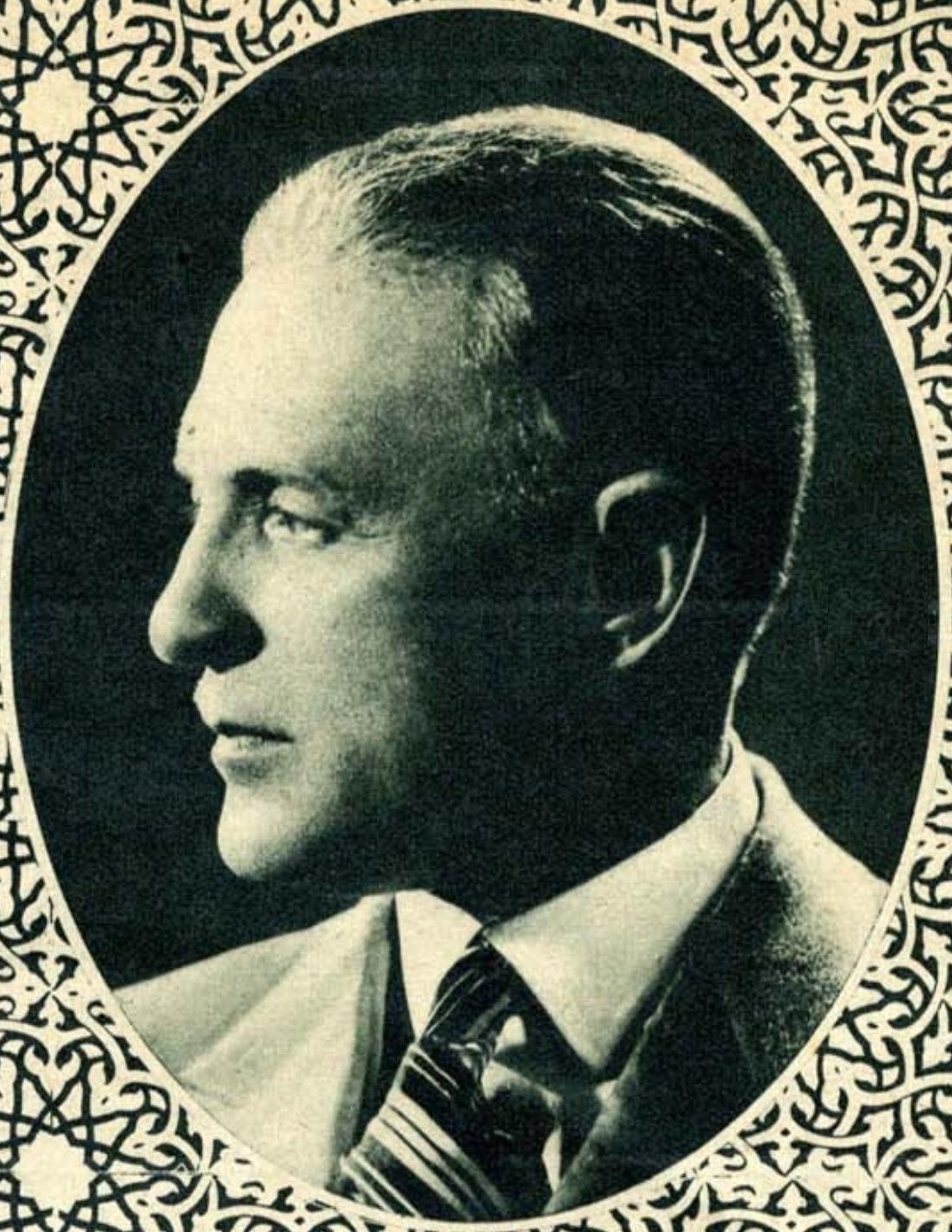

1st Egyptian Ambassador to Iran
- In office 1939–1942
- Monarch: Farouk I
- Succeeded by: Abdel Latif Pasha Talaat

Personal details
- Born: 6 June 1866
- Died: 15 July 1965 (aged 99)
- Spouse: Zeinab Said
- Children: Queen Farida (née Safinaz); Muhammad Sa'id; Sherif Zulficar
- Education: Egyptian Khedivial School
- Profession: Judge, Politician, Ambassador

Youssef Zulficar Pasha (Arabic: يوسف باشا ذو الفقار; 6 June 1866 – 15 July 1965) was an Egyptian judge and politician. He was the father of Queen Farida of Egypt and thus father-in-law of King Farouk I.

== Biography ==
Youssef Zulficar belonged to an Egyptian Circassian family, whose ancestors came to Egypt with viceroy Muhammad Ali Pasha at the beginning of the 19th century, and who went on to become part of the country's aristocracy. He was the grandson of Youssef Bey Rasmi, commander of the Egyptian armies in the Abyssinian and Russian Wars. His father was Ali Zulficar, a former Governor of Cairo. Youssef Zulficar obtained a law degree from the Khedivial School in Cairo and entered the judiciary. He became vice-president of the Alexandria Mixed Court of Appeal.

Zulficar married Zeinab Sa'id, the daughter of former Prime Minister Muhammad Sa'id Pasha and sister of renowned artist Mahmoud Sa'id. Zeinab served as lady-in-waiting to Queen Nazli. Zulficar and Zeinab had a daughter, Safinaz (born in 1921), as well as two sons, Muhammad Sa'id (born c. 1926) and Sherif (born c. 1931). After her son Farouk ascended the throne as King of Egypt, Queen Nazli urged him to take Zulficar's daughter Safinaz as his wife. Although Zulficar was wary at the prospect of his daughter becoming part of the royal family and feared the outcome of the marriage, the wedding eventually took place. Safinaz became Queen of Egypt and changed her name to Farida when she married King Farouk I on 20 February 1938. Farouk conferred upon Zulficar the nobiliary title of Pasha on 25 August 1937, six months before the wedding ceremony. Upon his daughter's marriage, Zulficar received from the Royal Chamberlain an envelope containing a cheque for 10,000,000 Egyptian piastres (US$257,000), half of the royal dowry.

Zulficar was appointed the first Egyptian ambassador to Iran on 13 March 1939. His appointment came after diplomatic relations between the two countries were upgraded to ambassadorial level. He was initially sent to Iran to prepare for the arrival of King Farouk's sister Princess Fawzia, who married Mohammad Reza Pahlavi, the then crown prince (later shah) of Iran on 16 March 1939. Following the outbreak of World War II, Zulficar secretly communicated with representatives of the Axis powers in Tehran. King Farouk and many Egyptians at the time sympathized with Nazi Germany in the hope that an Axis victory would put an end to the decades-old British occupation of Egypt. Zulficar informed the German minister plenipotentiary in Tehran of Egypt's goodwill towards Germany and of the king's respect for Adolf Hitler. The most dangerous mission of Zulficar's ambassadorship took place in 1941, when he forwarded to the Germans a letter by King Farouk containing details of the forthcoming Anglo-Soviet invasion of Iran. In 1942, Zulficar was replaced as Egypt's ambassador to Iran by Abdel Latif Pasha Talaat. He returned to Egypt where he was nominated as a senator in July of the same year. He was renominated as a senator in May 1946.

Farouk and Farida's marriage was not successful, and the two divorced in 1948. Four years later, the Egyptian Revolution of 1952 toppled King Farouk. Following Farouk's abdication and his departure from Egypt, Zulficar granted interviews to the press in which he talked about his daughter's divorce from the ex-king. This angered Farouk, who stated that "the aged, garrulous father of my first wife [...] in his dotage is apparently now ready to gossip upon intimate family matters with any wandering reporter who cares to rap upon his front door." Farouk believed the reason Zulficar was talking publicly about the divorce was because he was "no doubt anxious to ingratiate himself with [Egypt's] dangerous new regime."

== Decorations ==
Zulficar was a recipient of the Grand Cordon of the Order of the Nile.
