= Farida of Egypt =

Egyptian queen consort (1921–1988)

Farida فريدة
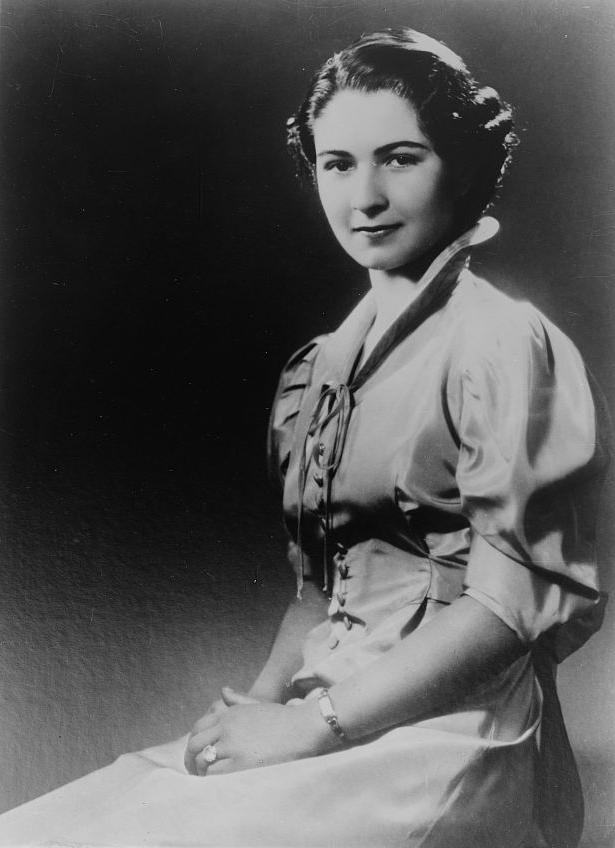

Queen consort of Egypt
- Tenure: 20 January 1938 – 17 November 1948
- Born: 5 September 1921; Alexandria, Egypt
- Died: 16 October 1988 (aged 67); Maadi, Cairo, Egypt
- Burial: Al-Rifa'i Mosque, Cairo, Egypt
- Spouse: Farouk I of Egypt (m. 1938; div. 1948)
- Issue: Princess Ferial; Princess Fawzia; Princess Fadia
Names
- Safinaz Zulficar (birth name); Arabic: صافيناز ذوالفقار
- House: Alawiyya (by marriage)
- Father: Youssef Zulficar Pasha
- Mother: Zeinab Zulficar
- Religion: Sunni Islam
- Occupation: Painter

Farida (born Safinaz Zulficar Arabic: صافيناز ذو الفقار 5 September 1921 – 16 October 1988) was the queen of Egypt for nearly eleven years as the first wife of King Farouk. She was the first queen of Egypt since Cleopatra to have left seclusion and played a public representational role, attending public functions and acting as honorary patron of various charities and public foundations and programs in accordance with the modern image the monarchy wished to represent at the time. The marriage was dissolved by divorce in 1948.

== Early life and education ==
Queen Farida was born Safinaz Zulficar on 5 September 1921 to an Egyptian noble family in Janaklis, Alexandria. Her father, Youssef Zulficar Pasha, was a judge of Circassian origin; he was also vice president of the Alexandria Mixed Court of Appeals. Her mother, Zeinab Zulficar, was a lady-in-waiting of Queen Nazli Sabri. On her mother's side, Farida's uncle was the artist and lawyer Mahmoud Sa'id, and her grandfather was the former prime minister of Egypt Muhammad Said Pasha, who was also of Circassian origin. Farida attended elementary and primary education at Notre Dame de Sion in Alexandria, a school run by French nuns.

== Marriage and issues ==
Farida and King Farouk first met on a royal trip to London in 1937. They were engaged in the summer of 1937.

She married King Farouk on 20 January 1938 at Qubba Palace in Cairo, Egypt. She was renamed Farida as her regnal name in accordance with the royal naming convention initiated by King Fuad I that members of the royal family should bear the same initials. She wore a wedding gown designed by The House of Worth in Paris.

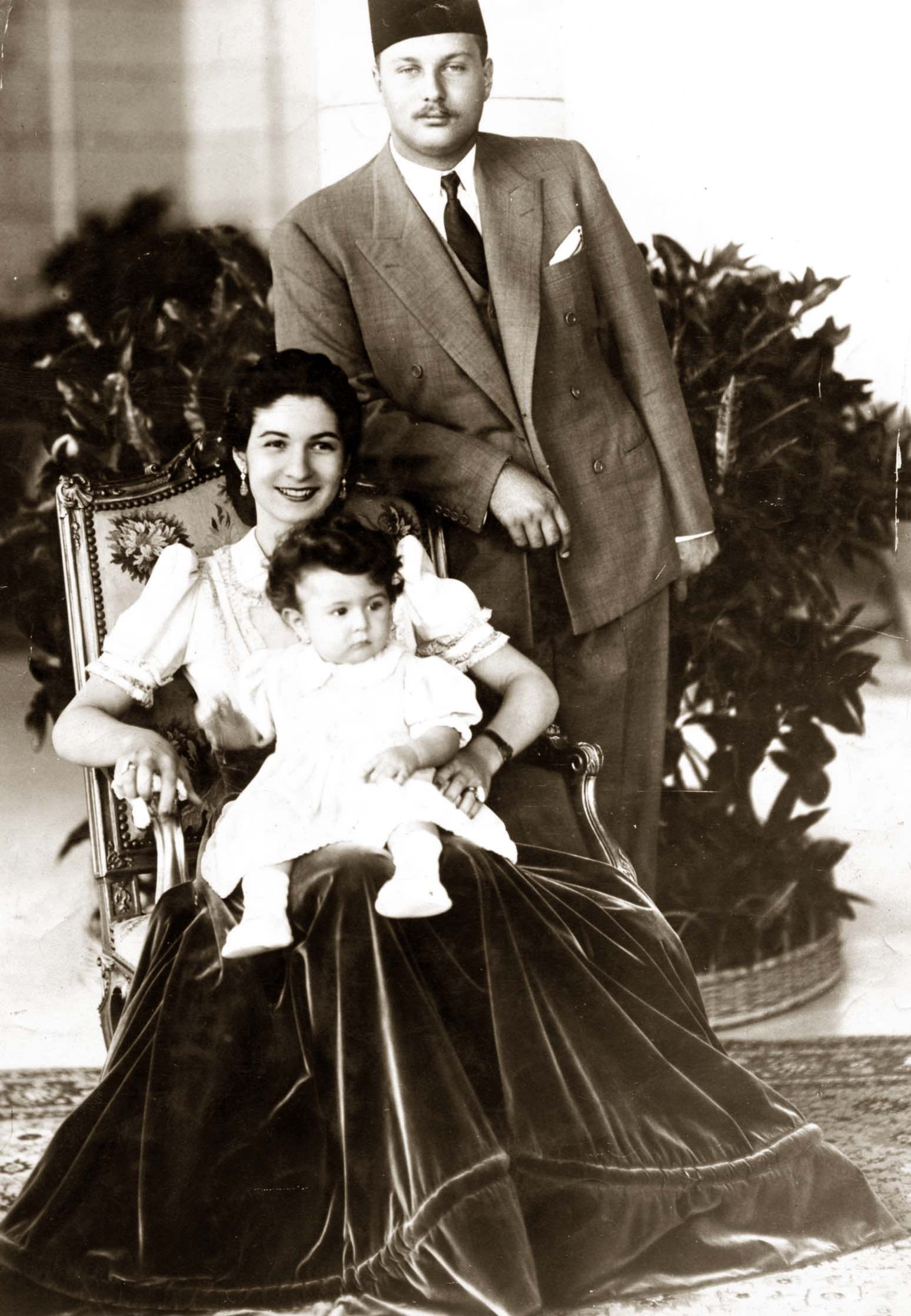
Princess Ferial with King Farouk and Queen Farida, c. 1940.

She had three daughters:

- Princess Ferial,
- Princess Fawzia and
- Princess Fadia.

After the birth of a third daughter, Farouk divorced her, on 19 November 1948. King Farouk cared for the first two daughters, while Farida cared for the youngest one after the divorce.

== Queenship and public role ==
Queen Farida was born in a culture in which motherhood was the only priority of a woman. The birth of an heir to the throne was especially important. However, due to rising influence of the West, the role of the first lady and Queen rose to higher grounds.

A certain female emancipation at least in terms of visibility, had occurred in the Egyptian elite around the royal family, as it was regarded as a sign of modernity, suitable to use in the representation of the royal house to the Western world. In contrast to her predecessor, Queen Farida was not to live in seclusion, but to be given a public role.

The marriage in itself was used in official publicity to show the modern image the monarchy wished to give, and the royal couple was officially described as a modern domestic couple in a monogamous companionate marriage, which at that time had come to be regarded as the ideal of the Egyptian elite.

Also the rest of the women of the Royal family were freed from the seclusion of the harem of the Muhammad Ali dynasty after Farouk's succession to the throne. During the wedding of King Farouk and Queen Farida, an official state royal wedding banquet was held, which the new Queen as well as the King's mother and sisters attended in mixed company and photos published in the press, and two days after the wedding, the King introduced the new Queen to the public by appearing with her on the royal balcony, something no queen had been allowed before.

The position of first lady and Queen became an honorary position bearing with it public representational duties, such as attending charities, fundraisers, commemorations and receiving foreign dignitaries.

Queen Farida accepted the chair of the Red Crescent Society and was also honorary president of the Egyptian Feminist Union and the New Woman Alliance. She was also patron of the Egyptian Girl Guide Company which had an important role in community affairs.

During the last years of queenship, Farida progressively retired from public life during a time when her marriage deteriorated. King Farouk reportedly had numerous mistresses, did not show his queen consideration, excluded her from receptions and at one point instead attended a party of Princess Chevikar in the company of a mistress, placing her beside the Prime Minister Nuqrashi Pasha, who took offence. The absence of a male heir also contributed to the divorce.

The divorce was not popular in Egypt, since Farida was very popular, and King Farouk was publicly hissed at the Cairo Cinema because of it. Doria Shafik viewed the royal divorce, and Farida's choice to leave an unhappy marriage, as a call to the Egyptian woman to find her freedom and liberate herself: "In exchange for her liberty, Farida gave up a throne, one of the supreme gestures in the history of the Egyptian woman".

== Later life ==
Farida stayed in Egypt until 1964, living in Zamalek, a suburb on an island in the Nile. Later she settled in Lebanon where she saw her children after nearly ten years. In March 1965, when King Farouk died in Rome, she and her three daughters visited his body at the morgue. Then, she lived in Paris from 1968 to 1974 until she returned to Egypt in 1974, during the presidency of Anwar Sadat. She remained unmarried after the divorce. During the late 1960s, she began painting. An artist, she had personal exhibitions in Europe and the United States. One of her exhibitions was in Cairo in May 1980.

== Death ==
Farida was hospitalized in September 1988 due to several health problems, including leukemia, pneumonia and hepatitis. On 2 October, she was put in intensive care, then lapsed into a coma. She died of leukemia on 16 October 1988, aged 67, in Cairo.

== Honours ==
=== National honours ===
- (Kingdom of Egypt) House of Muhammad Ali: Former Grand Mistress Dame Grand Cross of the Order of the Virtues, Special Class

=== Foreign honours ===
- (Kingdom of Greece) Greek Royal Family: Dame Grand Cross of the Royal Order of Beneficence
- (Iran) Iranian Imperial Family: Dame Grand Cordon of the Imperial Order of Aftab
- (Kingdom of Yugoslavia) Yugoslavian Royal Family: Dame Grand Cross of the Royal Order of St. Sava

== See also ==
- List of consorts of the Muhammad Ali Dynasty

Egyptian royalty
Vacant Title last held by Nazli Sabri	Queen consort of Egypt; 1938–1948	Vacant Title next held by Narriman Sadek
