= Al-Hadith =

Literary journal

Al-Hadith (Arabic: الحديث; The Modern) was a literary magazine published in Aleppo. It was established around 1927 by Edmond Rabbath and Sami Kayyali and ran with few breaks through the 1950s.

Early sections of the publication included women's issues (النسائيات), literature (الأدب), and arts and sciences (العلوم والفنون).
