= Hasan Husni al-Tuwayrani =

Turkish journalist and poet (1849–1897)

Hasan Husni al-Tuwayrani (1849/60-1897) was a Turkish journalist and poet.

== Life ==
Born to Turkish family in 1849, al-Tuwayrani was born in Cairo then he later moved back to Turkey where he chose Journalism career. His full name is Hasan Ḥusnī Pasha bin Ḥusayn Arif al-Ṭuwayrānī.

al-Ṭuwayrānī travelled to many places in Asia, Africa and Eastern Europe. He was a bilingual, with advanced proficiency in both Turkish language and Arabic. He wrote literature and poetry in both languages. In 1884, he established in Istanbul an Arabic magazine called Al Insan (meaning "The Human"), which transformed into a newspaper later on; and stopped in 1890. He then travelled back to Egypt and participated in editing a number of Egyptian newspapers.
