= Mahmoud Sa'id =

Alexandrian judge and modern painter (1897–1964)

Mahmoud Saʿīd
- محمود سعيد
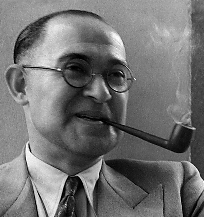
- Mahmoud Saeed
- Born: April 8, 1897; Alexandria, Egypt
- Died: April 8, 1964 (aged 67)
- Education: Law degree (Cairo); studied painting under Amelia Casonato da Forno and Arturo Zanieri; Académie Julian, Paris (1919–21)
- Known for: Painting (Oil)
- Notable work: (see article body or list works)
- Movement: Modern Egyptian art
- Awards: Exhibited in Venice Biennale (1938, 1948), New York (1937)

Mahmoud Said Bey (Arabic: محمود سعيد) (April 8, 1897 – April 8, 1964) was an Egyptian judge and painter from Alexandria.

== Life ==
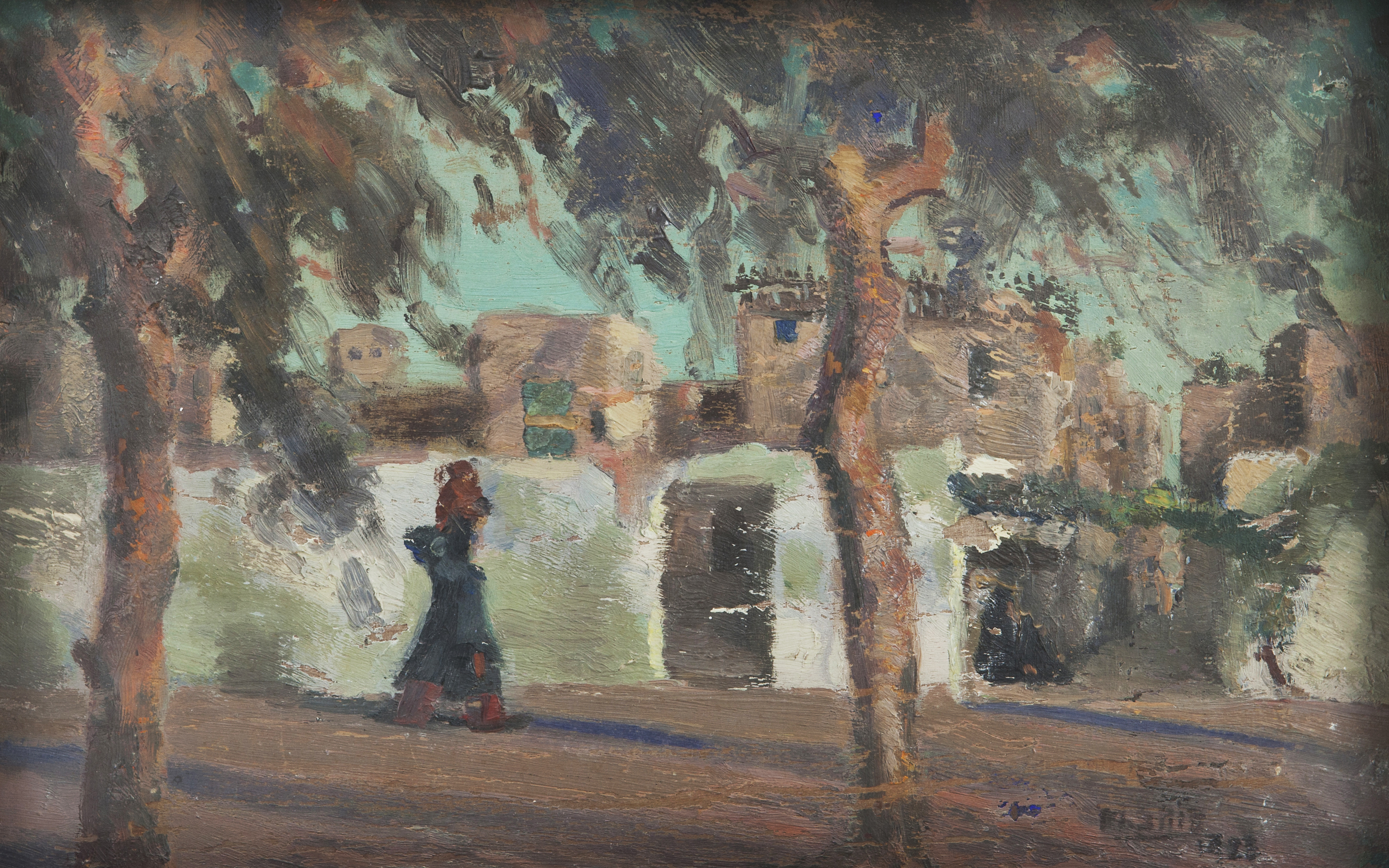
Recto-Village (1923) by Mahmoud Sa'id at the Barjeel Art Foundation

Mahmoud Said was born in Alexandria, Egypt; his father, Muhammad Said Pasha, was of Turkish origin and was the former Prime Minister of Egypt. Queen Farida of Egypt was his niece and she described him as "a quiet, gentle, oppressively timid man".

After receiving his high school diploma, he went on to law school, receiving his degree in 1919. Between 1919 and 1921 he travelled through Europe, ultimately studying at the Académie Julian. He returned to Egypt and worked at the Mixed Courts of Egypt until his father's death in the 1950s.

Between 1919 and his death in 1964, Said was a prolific oil painter. In Alexandria, he first trained for two years with the Italian painter Amelia Casonato Da Forno from 1912 and later with Arturo Zanieri from 1916. He often shared the studio of his good friend, the Greek painter Aristomenis Angelopoulos (Αριστομένης Αγγελόπουλος).

== Exhibitions ==
- New York, 1937.
- Venice Biennale, 1938, 1948.

== Collections ==
- Gezira Center for Modern Art, Cairo, Egypt.
- Mahmoud Said Museum, Alexandria, Egypt.
- Mathaf: Arab Museum of Modern Art, Doha, Qatar.
- Arab World Institute, Paris, France.
- Barjeel Art Foundation, Sharjah, UAE

== Museum ==
The Mahmoud Said Museum is located in the family villa in the Gianaclis neighborhood of Alexandria.
