= Mohamed Said Pasha =

Prime Minister of Egypt (1910–1914, 1919)

Mohamed Said Pasha GCMG
- محمد سعيد باشا
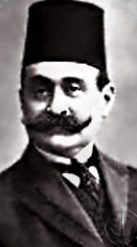
- Said in 1914

10th Prime Minister of Egypt
- In office 21 May 1919 – 19 November 1919
- Monarch: Fuad I
- Preceded by: Hussein Roshdy Pasha
- Succeeded by: Youssef Wahba
- In office 22 February 1910 – 5 April 1914
- Monarch: Abbas II
- Preceded by: Boutros Ghali
- Succeeded by: Hussein Roshdy Pasha

Personal details
- Born: 19 January 1863 Alexandria, Egypt
- Died: 1928 (aged 64–65)
- Citizenship: Ottoman Empire (1863-1914); Sultanate of Egypt (1914-1922); Kingdom of Egypt (1922-1928)
- Children: Zeinab Said; Mahmoud Sa'id; Badia Said; Nahed Said; Hussein Said

Mohamed Said Pasha GCMG (Arabic: محمد سعيد باشا; 19 January 1863 – 1928), was Prime Minister of Egypt from 1910 to 1914, and again in 1919. He was born in Alexandria to a family of Turkish origin. He was the father of the artist Mahmoud Sa'id and grandfather of Queen Farida of Egypt.

Political offices
Preceded by Boutros Ghali	Prime Minister of Egypt; 1910–1914	Succeeded by Hussein Roshdy Pasha
Preceded by Hussein Roshdy Pasha	Prime Minister of Egypt; 1919	Succeeded by Youssef Wahba Pasha
