= Yahya Haqqi =

Egyptian writer

- Born: 7 January 1905; Cairo, Egypt
- Died: 9 December 1992 (aged 87); Cairo, Egypt
- Education: Cairo University
- Occupations: Novelist, short story writer
- Writing career
- Language: Arabic
- Genres: Novel, Short story, Fiction
- Literary movement: Literary realism

Yahya Haqqi (Arabic:يحيى حقي) (7 January 1905 – 9 December 1992) (or Yehia Hakki, Yehia Haqqi) was an Egyptian writer and novelist. Born to a middle-class family in Cairo, he was a lawyer by profession who graduated from the Cairo School of Law in 1925. Like many other Egyptian writers, such as Naguib Mahfouz and Yusuf Idris, he spent most of his life as a civil servant, supplementing his literary income; he eventually rose to become adviser to the National Library of Egypt.

In his literary career, he published four collections of short stories, one novel (Umm Hashem's Lamp), and many articles and other short stories. He was editor of the literary magazine Al-Majalla from 1961 to 1971 when that publication was banned in Egypt. He experimented with the various literary norms: the short story, the novel, literary criticism, essays, meditations, and literary translation.

== Early life and family ==
Haqqi was born on January 7, 1905, in the Cairo neighborhood of Zainab to a middle-class Turkish Muslim family. His ancestors had emigrated from Turkey to Greece, and Ibrahim Haqqi (d. 1890), Yahya's grandfather, moved to Egypt in the early nineteenth century. Ibrahim Haqqi worked in Damietta for a period of time, and had three sons: Muhammad Ibrahim (Yahya's father), Mahmoud Taher, and Kamal. Muhammad Ibrahim's wife, Yahya's mother, was also of Turkish origin. Both of his parents enjoyed literature. Yahya Haqqi was the third son of six, and had two sisters. His oldest brother was Ibrahim, followed by Ismael. His younger siblings, in birth order, were Zachariah, Musa, Fatima, Hamza, and Miriam. Hamza and Miriam both died when they were only months old.

He graduated from the Faculty of Law and practiced as a lawyer in Alexandria. In 1929, he joined the diplomatic corps and served in Jeddah, Rome, Paris, and Ankara. In 1952, he was appointed ambassador to Libya. In 1953, he was appointed director of the Arts Department and then a literary advisor to the Egyptian General Book Organization in 1958. In 1959, he resigned his post and became editor of one of a Cairo-based magazine. In 1970, he was appointed member of the Supreme Council for Radio and Television.

== Literary career ==
In his literary career, he published four collections of short stories, one novel, ("Good Morning", translated from Arabic by Miriam Cooke), a novella (Umm Hashem's Lamp, twice translated from Arabic, by M.M.Badawi and Denys Johnson-Davies), and many articles some of which involved literary criticism of writers works, and other short stories besides. Sabri Hafez regards Haqqi as a pioneer in the writing of short stories, and experimenter in both form and style. Most literary critics comment Haqqi's style of writing and his language precision. He was editor of the literary magazine Al-Majalla from 1961 to 1971; this was a dangerous position, as the publication had been banned in Egypt by order of the government of Gamal Abdel Nasser. During that period and even before Haqqi championed budding Egyptian authors whose works he admired and believed in. In the 1960s, Haqqi took the very courageous step of retiring from writing short stories and novels, but he continued to write articles that critics described as artistic sketches.

== Work ==
His work at the Book Organization offered him an opportunity to read a lot. He is considered the father of short story and novel in Egypt. His first short story appeared in 1925, and he established himself as one of the greatest pioneers of contemporary short story writing in the Arab world.

His short stories convey attempts to express a certain philosophy on life, a certain stand or viewpoint and advocate human will, which he considered the fountain-spring of all virtues. He believed that language is not merely a tool of expression or of conveying ideas but rather, an integral part of the writing process in all literary norms. His study of law had its impact on his writings which are characterized by objectivity.

Haqqi also translated world famous literary works such as "The Chess Player" a.k.a. The Royal Game by Stefan Zweig, Baltagul (The Hatchet) by Mihail Sadoveanu, and "The Prodigal Father" by Edith Saunders, he also participated in translating the famous Russian Doctor Zhivago by Boris Pasternak.

=== Awards ===
In 1990, he won the King Faisal International Prize, in Arabic Language and Literature, Short Novels Category. The Prize is one of the most important events of the King Faisal Foundation (KFF).

He was awarded in 1983, the "Legion of Honor" title, First Class, by the Government of France. In addition, in the same year, he was awarded an honorary doctorate by Al Minya University, Egypt. In 1969, he won the Egyptian State Merit Award for his novel "The Postman", in which he portrays means of inculcating Egyptian values and principles. In 2005, UNESCO was associated with the celebration the centenary of the birth of Yahya Haqqi, as one of the icons of International Culture.

=== Books Written about Yahya Haqqi ===
"Gihad Fil Fann" (Effort for the Advancement of Art) جهاد فى الفن, Mustafa Abdalla, Publisher: Egyptian High Council for Culture. "Zekrayat Matweyya" (Unannounced Memories) ذكريات مطوية, Noha Yahya Haqqi.

== Bibliography ==
=== Non-fiction ===
- "The Dawn of the Egyptian Novel" فجر القصة المصرية
- "Antar and Juliet" عنتر وجولييت
- "Steps in Criticism" خطوات فى النقد
- "A Song of Simplicity" أنشودة للبساطة

a number of essays included in his "Complete Works" الأعمال الكاملة.

=== Literary works ===
His novel "Qandeel Om Hashem" (Om Hashem's Lantern) 1943, had its positive impact on the course of the Arabic novel for it was a precious work in both language and technique. In it he reviews the customs prevailing in the Egyptian countryside and the means of rectifying them through education so as to attain progress.

- "Om Al'awagiz" (The Mother of the Helpless) أم العواجز
- "Dima' Wa Teen" (Blood and Mud) دماء وطين
- "Antar and Juliet" عنتر وجوليت
- "Sah El Nome: (Wake-up) صح النوم
- "Ihtigag" (Protest) احتجاج
- "Aqrab Affandi" (Mr. Scorpion) عقرب أفندى
- "Tanawa'at Al Asbab" (Means Vary) تنوعت الأسباب
- "Qessa Fi Ard'hal "(A Story in a Petition) قصة فى عرضحال
- "Iflass Khatibah" (The Bankruptcy of a Matchmaker) إفلاس خاطبة
- "Al Firash Al Saghir" (The Small Bed) الفراش الصغير
- "Al Bostagi" (The Postman) البوسطجى
- The lamp of Umm Hashim قنديل أم هاشم

=== Autobiography ===
His book "Khaleeha Ala Allah" (Depend on God) is the most truthful autobiography and the most expressive of the development in the different stages of the author's life.
