= Farouk of Egypt =

King of Egypt from 1936 to 1952

Farouk I فاروق الأول
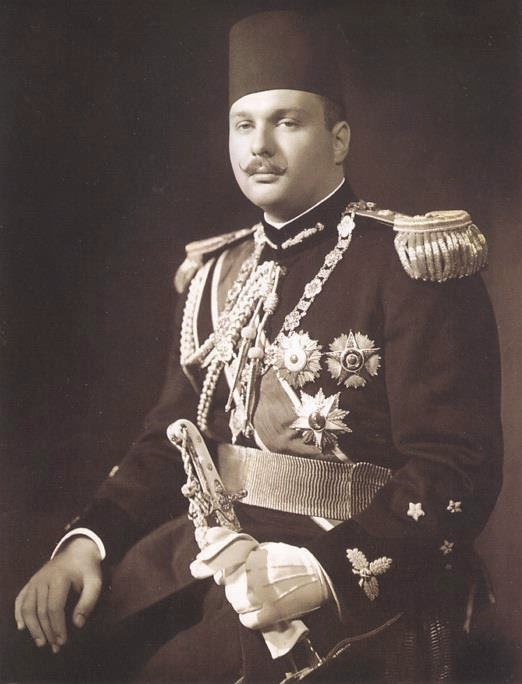
- Official portrait, 1946

King of Egypt and the Sudan
- Reign: 16 October 1951 – 26 July 1952
- Predecessor: Himself as King of Egypt
- Successor: Fuad II

King of Egypt and Sovereign of Nubia, the Sudan, Kordofan and Darfur
- Reign: 28 April 1936 – 16 October 1951
- Coronation: 29 July 1937
- Predecessor: Fuad I
- Successor: Himself as King of Egypt and the Sudan
- Regent: See list: Prince Muhammad Ali Tewfik; Aziz Ezzat Pasha; Sherif Sabri Pasha

Head of the House of Alawiyya
- Tenure: 28 April 1936 – 18 March 1965
- Predecessor: Fuad I
- Successor: Fuad II
- Born: 11 February 1920; Abdeen Palace, Cairo, Sultanate of Egypt
- Died: 18 March 1965 (aged 45); San Camillo Hospital, Rome, Italy
- Burial: Al-Rifa'i Mosque, Cairo, Egypt
- Spouses: Farida (née Safinaz Zulficar) (m. 1938; div. 1948); Narriman Sadek (m. 1951; div. 1954)
- Issue: Princess Ferial; Princess Fawzia; Princess Fadia; Fuad II of Egypt
Names
- Farouk bin Ahmed Fuad bin Ismail bin Ibrahim bin Muhammad Ali
- House: Alawiyya
- Father: Fuad I of Egypt
- Mother: Nazli Sabri

Farouk I (Note: His full title was His Majesty Farouk I, by God's grace, King of Egypt and the Sudan.) (/fəˈruːk/; Arabic: فاروق الأول, romanized: Fārūq al-Awwal; 11 February 1920 – 18 March 1965) was the tenth ruler of Egypt from the Muhammad Ali dynasty and the penultimate King of Egypt and the Sudan, succeeding his father, Fuad I, in 1936 and reigning until his overthrow in a military coup in 1952.

As King, Farouk was known for his extravagant playboy lifestyle. While initially popular, his reputation eroded due to the corruption and incompetence of his government. He was overthrown in the 1952 coup d'état and forced to abdicate in favour of his six-month-old son, Ahmed Fuad, who succeeded him as Fuad II. He in turn formally reigned as the last King of Egypt and the Sudan from July 1952 until the abolition of the Egyptian monarchy in June 1953. Farouk died in exile in Italy in 1965.

His sister, Princess Fawzia bint Fuad, was the first wife and consort of the Shah of Iran, Mohammad Reza Pahlavi.

== Early life and education ==
Farouk was born at Abdeen Palace in Cairo on 11 February 1920 as His Sultanic Highness Farouk bin Fuad, Hereditary Prince of Egypt and Sudan. He was the eldest child of Sultan Fuad I, later King Fuad I of Egypt and Sudan, and his second wife, Queen Nazli Sabri. He grew up with his sisters, Princess Fawzia, Princess Faiza, Princess Faika and Princess Fathia, as well as an older half-sister, Princess Fawkia, from his father's earlier marriage to Princess Shivakiar Khanum Effendi. Farouk came from a royal background with Albanian, Circassian, Turkish, French, Greek and Egyptian ancestry.

Farouk spent much of his childhood within the royal palaces, where his father tightly controlled his upbringing and restricted his contact with outsiders. Languages became the strongest part of his education from an early age. He spoke Egyptian Arabic, Turkish and French, later learned English and Italian, and became fluent in classical Arabic, which he later used in public speeches.

Tutors often criticized Farouk's academic performance outside language study. One wrote, "Improve your bad handwriting and pay attention to the cleanliness of your notebook", while another complained that he did not know "the history of your ancestors". Others praised him excessively, including one tutor who described an essay beginning "My father had a lot of ministers and I have a cat" as evidence of a "brilliant future" in literature.

Farouk also became known for practical jokes from a young age. At Koubbeh Palace, he once used an air gun to shoot out windows, and during a visit by Queen Marie of Romania he arranged for two horses to be brought into the royal harem after she expressed interest in seeing them. The incident reportedly ended after the animals defecated on the palace floors, greatly displeasing both Queen Marie and Queen Nazli. His closest companion during childhood was Antonio Pulli, an Italian electrician at Abdeen Palace who later became influential during his reign.

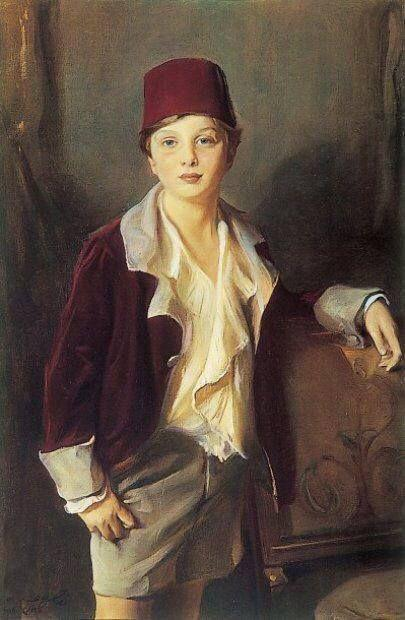
Portrait by Philip de László, 1929

After failing the entrance examinations for Eton College, Farouk attended the Royal Military Academy, Woolwich, in England, as an extramural student. In October 1935, at the age of 15, he moved to Kenry House in Surrey while attending Woolwich. One tutor, the Egyptian military officer General Aziz Ali al-Misri, complained that Farouk avoided studying and expected answers during examinations. Instead, he spent much of his time in London shopping, attending football matches and visiting restaurants and brothels. Another tutor, the Egyptian explorer and courtier Ahmed Hassanein, gave more favourable reports of his progress.

In January 1936, at the age of 15, Farouk represented Egypt at the funeral of King George V of the United Kingdom at Westminster Abbey in London. During the same period, Egypt remained socially and economically unequal, with much of the country's cultivated land controlled by a small landowning elite.

== Ascension to the throne ==
=== Accession ===
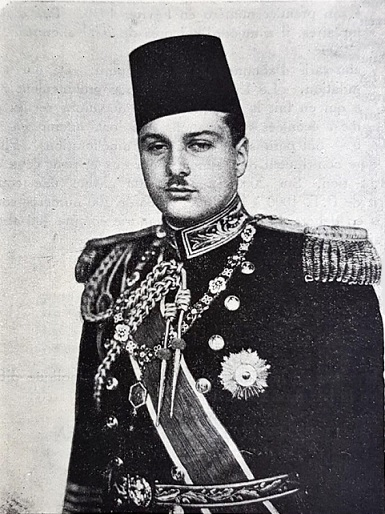
Farouk I, c. 1937

On 28 April 1936, King Fuad I died of a heart attack, and his sixteen-year-old son Farouk left England to return to Egypt as king. Before departing, he visited Buckingham Palace to accept the condolences of Edward VIII, then travelled through France and crossed the Mediterranean to Egypt. When he arrived in Alexandria on 6 May 1936, he was greeted by large crowds shouting "Long live the king of the Nile!" and "Long live the king of Egypt and the Sudan!"

At the beginning of his reign, Farouk was widely popular and was known as al malik al mahbub ("the beloved king"). Along with the throne, he inherited enormous wealth. Fuad left him a fortune estimated at US$100 million, including 30,000 hectares (74,000 acres) of land in the Nile valley, five palaces, 200 automobiles and two yachts. The land alone amounted to about one-seventh of Egypt's arable farmland.

Although Farouk inherited immense wealth and popularity, at age sixteen he came to the throne with little preparation for rule. Reflecting on the circumstances of his accession, his biographer William Stadiem wrote:

no pharaoh, no Mameluke, no khedive ever began a reign with such unquestionable, enthusiastic goodwill as King Farouk. And none was as unprepared to rule. Here was a completely sheltered, virtually uneducated sixteen-year old, expected to fill the spats of his wily, politically astute father in a loaded tug-of-war between nationalism, imperialism, constitutionalism, and monarchy.

Shortly after becoming king, Farouk addressed the nation by radio, becoming the first Egyptian sovereign to speak directly to the public in this way:

And if it is God's will to lay on my shoulders at such an early age the responsibility of kingship, I on my part appreciate the duties that will be mine, and I am prepared for all sacrifices in the cause of my duty. ... My noble people, I am proud of you and your loyalty and am confident in the future as I am in God. Let us work together. We shall succeed and be happy. Long live the Motherland!

=== Relations with Britain ===
As Farouk was extremely popular with the Egyptian people, it was decided by the Prime Minister, Aly Maher, that Farouk should not return to Britain as that would be unpopular, though one of the regents, Prince Muhammad Ali, had wanted Farouk to keep trying to be admitted on a full-time basis to the Royal Military Academy as a means of getting him out of the country. Since under Egyptian law women could not inherit the throne, Farouk's cousin Prince Muhammad Ali was next in line to the throne. Prince Muhammad Ali was to spend the next 16 years scheming to depose Farouk so he could become king. Egypt was in the process of negotiating a treaty that would reduce some of the British privileges in Egypt and make the country more independent in exchange for keeping Egypt in the British sphere of influence. The ambitions of Benito Mussolini to dominate the Mediterranean led the Wafd—traditionally the anti-British party—to want to keep the British presence in Egypt, at least as long as Mussolini kept calling the Mediterranean Mare Nostrum. For both the Wafd and the British, it was convenient to keep Farouk in Egypt so that when he signed the new Anglo-Egyptian treaty, it would not be seen as under duress as it would be if Farouk was living in Britain. Sir Miles Lampson believed he together with assorted other British officials like the king's tutor, Edward Ford, could mould Farouk into an Anglophile. Lampson's plans were derailed when it emerged that Farouk was more interested in duck-hunting than Ford's lectures and that the king had "bragged" he would "have the hell" with the British, saying they had humiliated him for long enough.

The fact that Farouk had dismissed all of the British servants employed by his father, while keeping the Italian servants, suggested he had inherited Fuad's Italophilia. Farouk especially resented Lampson's attempts to set himself up as a surrogate father, finding him impossibly patronising and rude, complaining that at one moment Lampson would address him as a king and the next moment would call him to his face a "naughty boy". Lampson was 55 when Farouk acceded to the throne and he never learned how to treat the teenage Farouk as an equal. The official was charmed by Egypt, which he regarded as a wondrous exotic land, but as his Arabic was not particularly good, his contacts with ordinary Egyptians were only on a superficial level. Lampson was fluent in French and his social contracts were almost entirely with the Egyptian elite. Lampson wrote in his diary about the death of King Fuad: "Slippery customer though he was, he was an immense factor in the situation here and... we could always in the last resort get him to act in any particular line that we wished". About Farouk, Lampson wrote he did not expect to have "a young immature King on our hands. I frankly don't know quite how that problem is going to be handled".

=== Early popularity ===
Farouk was enamoured of the glamorous royal lifestyle. Although he already had thousands of acres of land, dozens of palaces and hundreds of cars, the youthful king often travelled to Europe for grand shopping sprees, earning the ire of many of his subjects. It is said that he ate 600 oysters a week. His personal vehicle was a red 1947 Bentley Mark VI, with coachwork by Figoni et Falaschi; he dictated that, other than the military jeeps which made up the rest of his entourage, no other cars were to be painted red. In 1951, he bought the pear-shaped 94-carat Star of the East diamond and a fancy-coloured oval-cut diamond from jeweller Harry Winston.

He was most popular in his early years, and the nobility largely celebrated him. For example, during the accession of the young King Farouk, "the Abaza family had solicited palace authorities to permit the royal train to stop briefly in their village so that the king could partake of refreshments offered in a large, magnificently ornamented tent the family had erected in the train station." The Chief Accountant to Farouk was Yadidya Israel, who was secretly working with the Free Officers movement that removed the King in 1952, as was the Abaza family's own Wagih Abaza, who later became governor of six governorates in post-Farouk Egypt.

=== Relations with the Wafd ===
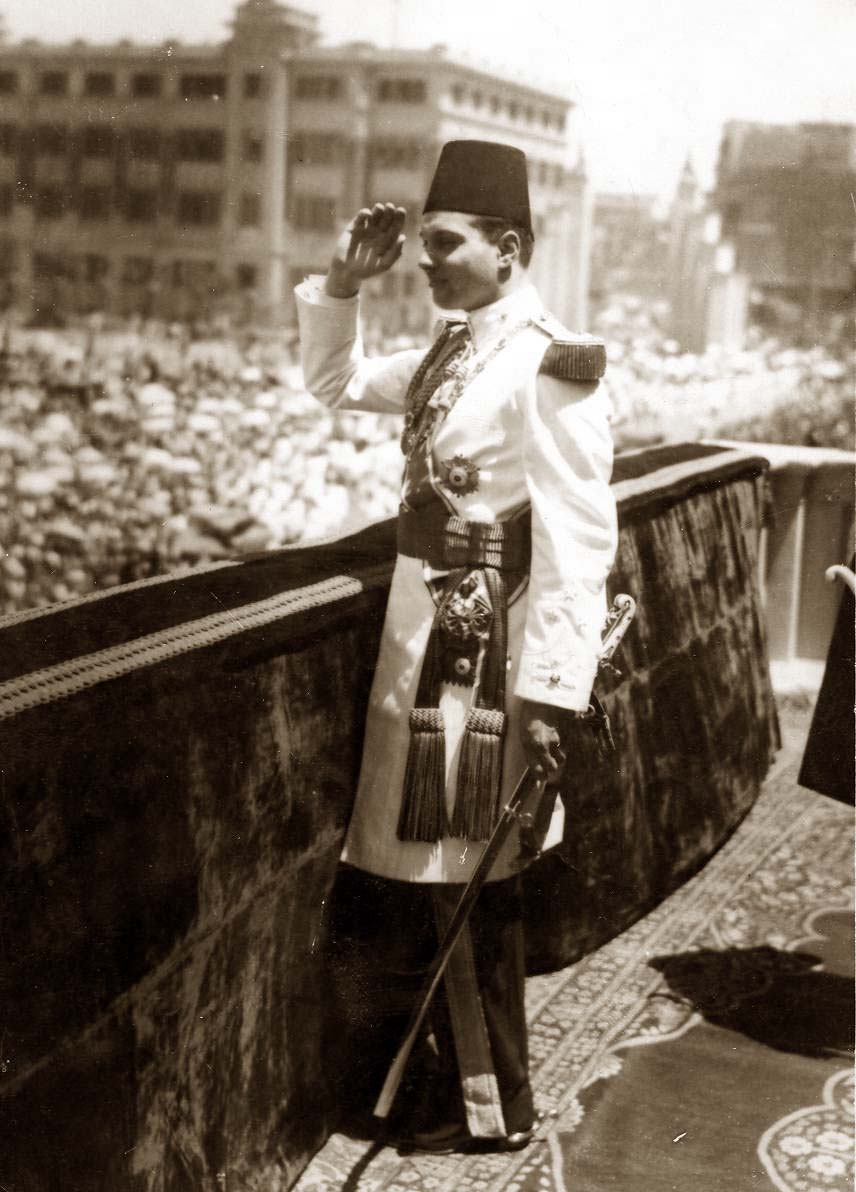
Farouk saluting Egyptian citizens assembled in Abdeen Square in Cairo, c. 1937

Farouk's accession was initially encouraging for the populace and nobility, due to his youth and Egyptian roots through his mother Nazli Sabri. Standing 6'0 tall and extremely handsome in his teenage years, Farouk was viewed as a sex symbol in his early years, making the cover of Time magazine as a leader to watch while Life magazine in article on him called the Abdeen Palace "possibly the most magnificent royal place in the world" and Farouk "the very model of a young Muslim gentleman". However, the situation was not the same with some Egyptian politicians and elected government officials, with whom Farouk quarrelled frequently, despite their loyalty in principle to his throne. There was also the issue of the British influence in the Egyptian government, which Farouk viewed with disdain. Farouk's accession had changed the dynamic of Egyptian politics from being a struggle of an unpopular king vs. the popular Wafd party as it was under his father to that of a popular Wafd vs. an even more popular king. The Wafd Party, led by Nahas Pasha, had been the most popular party in Egypt since it had been founded in 1919, and the Wafd leaders felt threatened by Farouk's popularity with ordinary Egyptians. Right from the start of Farouk's reign, the Wafd—who claimed to speak alone for Egypt's masses—saw Farouk as a threat and Nahas Pasha worked constantly to clip the king's power, confirming the prejudices that Farouk had inherited from his father against the Wafd. When Nahas and the other Wafd leaders travelled to London to sign the Anglo-Egyptian treaty in August 1936, they stopped over in Switzerland to hold discussions with former Khedive Abbas II about how best to depose Farouk and put Abbas back on the throne.

The dominant figure in the Wafd was Makram Ebeid, the man widely considered to be the most intelligent Egyptian politician of the interwar era. Ebeid was a Coptic Christian, which made it unacceptable for him to be prime minister of Muslim majority Egypt, and so he exercised power via his protege Nahas, who was the official party leader. Leaders in the Wafd like Ali Maher, opposed to Ebeid and Nahas, looked to Farouk as a rival source of patronage and power. Both Ebeid and Nahas disliked Maher, regarding him as an intriguer and an opportunist, and found a further reason to dislike him even more when Maher became Farouk's favourite political adviser. The nationalistic Wafd Party was the most powerful political machine in Egypt, and when the Wafd was in power, it tended to be very corrupt and nepotistic. Those excluded from opportunities for corruption, like Maher Pasha, made much of the corruption, in particular the baleful influence of Nahas Pasha's dominating wife (who insisted on giving high government jobs to members of her family, no matter how unqualified they were). Though the Wafd Party had been founded in 1919 as the anti-British party, the fact that Nahas Pasha championed the 1936 treaty as the best way of keeping Mussolini from conquering Egypt as he had done Ethiopia, paradoxically led Lampson to favour Nahas and the Wafd as the most pro-British party, in turn leading opponents of the Wafd to attack them for "selling out" by signing a treaty which allowed the British to keep their garrisons in Egypt. As Farouk could not stand the overbearing Lampson, and saw the Wafd as his enemies, the king naturally aligned himself with the anti-Wafd factions and those who saw the treaty as a "sell out". Lampson personally favoured deposing Farouk and putting his cousin Prince Muhammad Ali on the throne in order to keep the Wafd in power, but feared that a coup would destroy the popular legitimacy of Nahas.

=== Public religion and populism ===
Despite the regency council, Farouk was determined to exercise his royal prerogatives. When Farouk asked for a new railroad station to be built outside of the Montazah palace, the council refused under the grounds that station was only used twice a year by the royal family, when they arrived at the Montazah palace to escape the summer heat in Cairo and when they returned to Cairo in the fall. Unwilling to take no for an answer, Farouk called out his servants and led them to demolish the station, forcing the regency council to approve building a new station. To counterbalance the Wafd, Farouk from the time he arrived back in Egypt started to use Islam as a political weapon, always attending the Friday prayers at the local mosques, donating to Islamic charities, and courting the Muslim Brotherhood, the only group capable of rivalling the Wafd in terms of the ability to mobilize the masses. Farouk was known in his early years as the "pious king" as unlike his predecessors he went out of his way to be seen as a devout Muslim. The Egyptian historian Laila Morsy wrote that Nahas never really tried to reach an understanding with the Palace, and treated Farouk as an enemy from the start, seeing him as a threat to the Wafd. The Wafd ran a powerful patronage machine in rural Egypt and the enthusiastic response of the fellaheen to the king as he threw gold coins at them during his tours of the countryside was viewed by Nahas as a major threat. Nahas sought to prevent the king from "parading" himself before the masses, claiming that the king's royal tours cost the government too much money, and as the Wafd was a secularist party, charged that Farouk's overt religiosity violated the constitution. However, the attacks by the secularist Wafd on Farouk for being too pious a Muslim estranged conservative Muslim opinion who rallied in defence of the "pious king". As the Coptic Christian minority tended to vote as a bloc for the Wafd and many prominent Wafd leaders like Ebeid were Copts, the Wafd was widely seen as the "Coptic party". The aggressive defence by Nahas of secularism as a core principle of Egyptian life and his attacks against the king as a danger for being a devout Muslim led to a backlash and the charge that secularism was merely a device for allowing the Coptic Christian minority to dominate Egypt at the expense of the Muslim majority.

=== Assumption of full powers and coronation ===
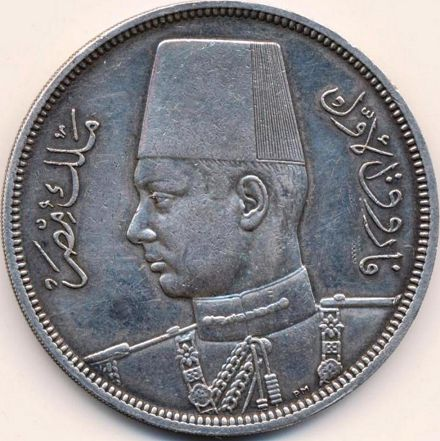
Coin issuance after Farouk's coronation, 1937

On 29 June 1937, Farouk turned 17 under the Islamic lunar calendar, and since in the Islamic world a baby is considered to be one year old at the time of birth, by Muslim standards he was celebrating his 18th birthday. As he was considered 18, he thus attained his majority, and the Regency Council, which had irked Farouk so much, was dissolved. Farouk's coronation, held in Cairo, on 29 July 1937, outdid the coronation of George VI, which had just taken place that May, as Farouk held larger parades and fireworks displays than had taken place in London. For his coronation, Farouk reduced the fares on the Nile steamers and at least two million fellaheen (Egyptian peasants) took advantage of the price cut to attend his coronation in Cairo. Farouk's coronation speech implicitly criticized the land-owning Turco-Circassian elite that he himself was a part of, as Farouk declared: "The poor are not responsible for their poverty but rather the wealthy. Give to the poor what they merit without their asking. A king is a good king when the poor of the land have the right to live, when the sick have the right to be healed, when the timid have the right to be tranquil and when the ignorant have the right to learn". Farouk's coronation speech, which was unexpectedly poetic, was written by his tutor, the poet Ahmed Hassanein, who felt that the king should present himself as the friend of the fellaheen to undercut the populist Wafd Party.

=== Dismissal of the Wafd government ===
In the fall of 1937, Farouk dismissed the Wafd government headed by Prime Minister Mostafa El-Nahas and replaced him as Prime Minister with Mohamed Mahmoud Pasha. The immediate issue were Nahas's attempts to dismiss Farouk's chef de cabinet Ali Maher together with Farouk's Italian servants, but the more general issue was who would rule Egypt: the Crown or Parliament? As a number of ministers in the new government were pro-Italian at the same time that Mussolini was increasing the number of Italian troops in Libya, Farouk's move was seen as pro-Italian and anti-British. Lampson delivered what he called a "little lecture" to Farouk, reporting to London: "It will be fatal if the boy [Farouk] comes to think he is invincible and can play any trick he likes. Personally I have always liked him and he certainly has a most remarkable intelligence and courage—one begins to fear almost too much of the latter". At a meeting at the Abdeen Palace in December 1937, where Lampson declared that London was opposed to the Mahmoud government, Lampson reported: "I found him rather baffling to deal with—in extraordinary good humour and apparently taking the whole thing rather flippantly whist at times relapsing into a very 'kingly' attitude". Farouk told Lampson that he didn't care if the Wafd had a majority in Parliament, as he was the king and he wanted a prime minister who would obey him, not Parliament. Lampson ended the meeting by saying Quos deus vult perdere prius dementat ("Those God wishes to destroy, he first makes mad").

== Reign ==
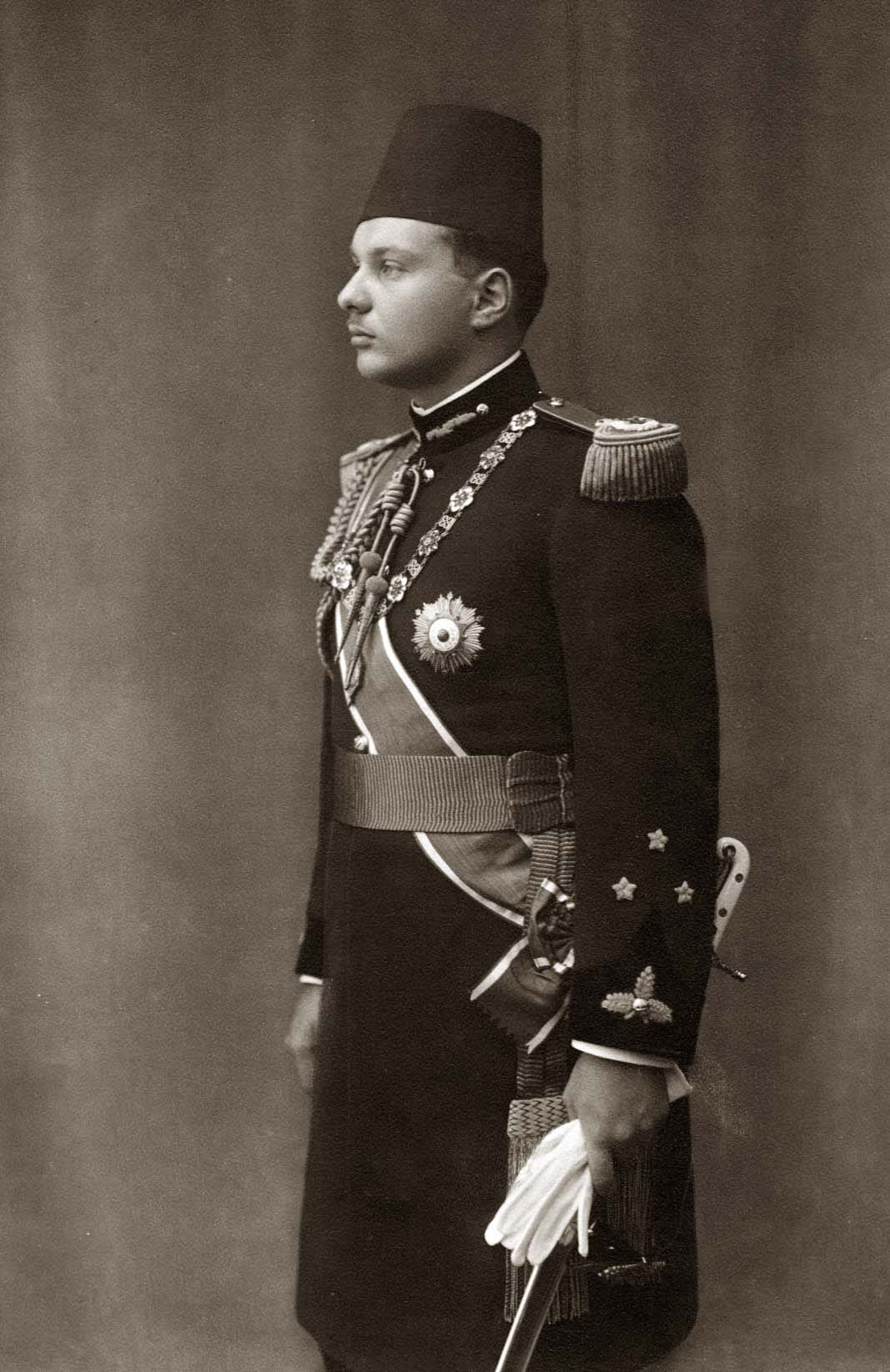
Farouk I, c. 1938

=== World War II ===
Egypt remained neutral in World War II, but under heavy pressure from Lampson, Farouk broke diplomatic relations with Germany in September 1939.

Under the 1936 treaty, Britain had the right to defend Egypt from an invasion, which turned the Western Desert of Egypt into a battlefield when Italy declared war on Britain on 10 June 1940, and invaded Egypt. Under the 1936 treaty, the Egyptians were obligated to assist the British with logistical services, but Maher frustrated this by appointing corrupt bureaucrats to positions such as presidency of the Egyptian state railroad who demanded baksheesh (bribe) in exchange for co-operating. Owing to the strategic importance of Egypt, ultimately 2 million soldiers from Britain, Australia, India and New Zealand arrived in Egypt. Lampson was against Egypt declaring war on the Axis powers despite the Italian invasion of Egypt as having Egypt as a belligerent would mean Egypt would have the right to attend the peace conference once the Allies had won the war, and as Lampson put it, the Egyptians would make demands that would be "embarrassing" for the British at such a peace conference.

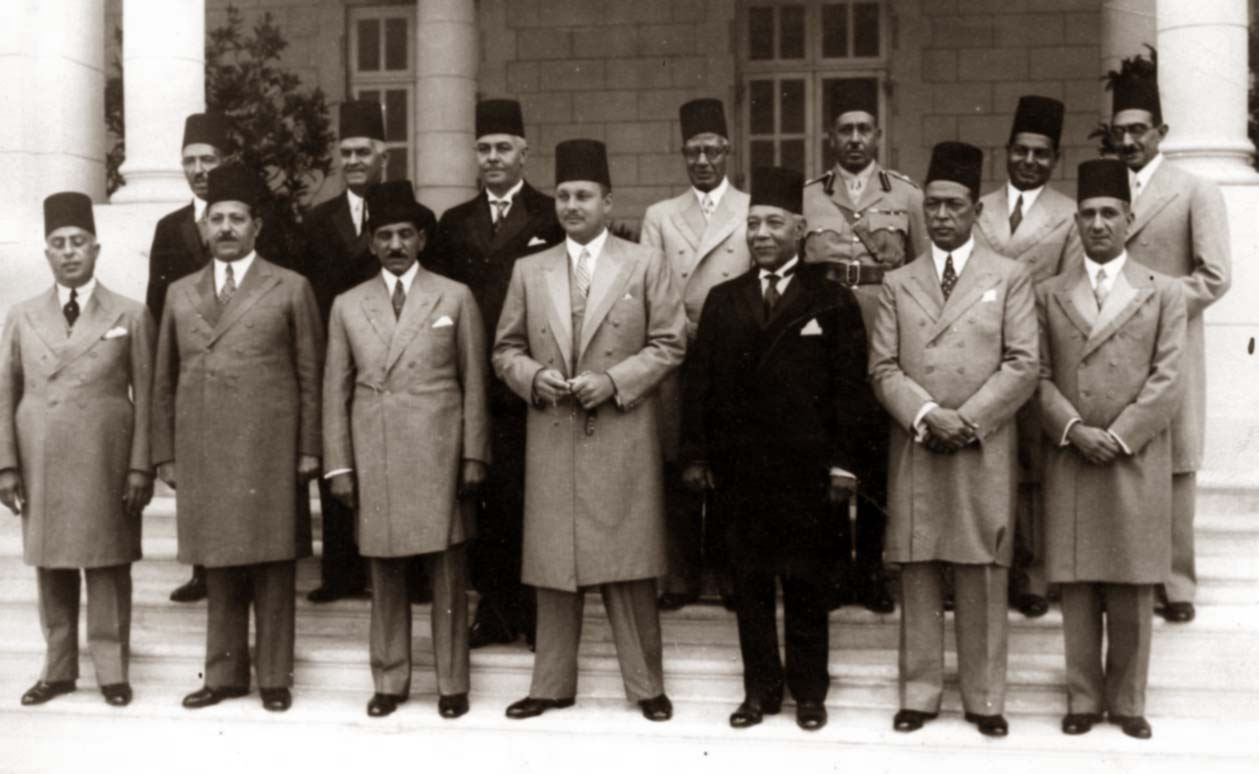
Members of Ali Maher Pasha's second government surround Farouk I (fourth from right), 1939

Farouk was greatly upset in 1940 when he learned that his mother, Queen Nazli, whom he viewed as a rather chaste figure, was having an affair with his former tutor, Prince Ahmed Hassanein, who as a desert explorer, poet, Olympic athlete and aviator, was one of the most famous Egyptians alive. When Farouk caught Hassanein reading passages from the Quran to his mother in her bedroom, he pulled out a handgun and threatened to shoot them, saying "you are disgracing the memory of my father, and if I end it by killing one of you, then God will forgive me, for it is according to our holy law as you both know". Distracting Farouk from thoughts of matricide was a meeting on 17 June 1940, with Lampson who demanded that Farouk dismiss Maher as prime minister and General al-Misri as chief of staff of the Egyptian Army, saying both were pro-Axis. Lampson wrote to London: "I repeated I hoped that he realized we were in deadly earnest. He said he knew that full well, and cryptically, that so was he".

On 28 June 1940, Farouk dismissed Maher Pasha as prime minister, but refused to appoint Nahas Pasha as prime minister as Lampson wanted, saying that Nahas was full of "Bolshevik schemes". The new prime minister was Hassan Sabry, whom Lampson felt was acceptable, and despite his previous threats to kill him, Prince Hassanein was made chef de cabinet. Prince Hassanein had been educated at Oxford University and unusually for an Egyptian, was an Anglophile, having fond memories of his time in England when he studied at Oxford. Lampson had come to detest Farouk by this time, and his favourite advice to London was "the only thing to do is kick the boy out". In November 1940, the Prime Minister Sabry died of a heart attack when delivering his opening speech to Parliament and was replaced with Hussein Serry Pasha. Farouk felt very lonely as a king, not having any real friends, made worse by the very public feud between Queen Farida and Queen Nazli as the former hated the latter for her attempts to dominate her. Farouk's best friend was Pulli, who was more of a "man Friday". Maher had made contacts on behalf of the king with General al-Misri, on "sick leave" since June 1940; with a group of anti-British officers in the Egyptian Army, and Hassan el Banna, the Supreme Guide of the Muslim Brotherhood, to discuss a possible anti-British uprising when the Axis broke through the British lines. Egypt together with the American South was one of the few places in the world suitable for growing cotton, a water-intensive and labour-intensive crop that was traditionally known as "white gold" owing to the high prices it fetched. World War II created a huge demand for cotton, and after the United States entered the war in late 1941, so many American men were called up for service with the armed forces that Egypt became the only source of cotton for the Allies. For those who owned farmland in Egypt on which cotton was grown, the Second World War was a time of prosperity as the high prices of cotton counteracted the effects of wartime inflation.

The Italians had only advanced within 80 kilometres (50 mi) of Egypt before stopping at Sidi Barrani, and on 9 December 1940, the British launched an offensive that drove the Italians back into Libya. In response, in January 1941, German forces were dispatched to the Mediterranean to assist the Italians and on 12 February 1941, the Afrika Korps under the command of Erwin Rommel arrived in Libya. Starting on 31 March 1941, a Wehrmacht offensive drove the British out of Libya and into Egypt. As 95% of Egyptians live in the Nile river valley, the fighting in the Western Desert only affected the Bedouin nomads who lived in the desert. At the same time in 1941 that Rommel was inflicting a series of defeats on the British in the Western Desert, Farouk wrote to Adolf Hitler promising him that when the Wehrmacht entered the Nile river valley, he would bring Egypt into the war on the Axis side. The American historian Gerhard Weinberg wrote that the fact that Farouk wanted to see his country occupied by Fascist Italy and Nazi Germany was not a sign of great wisdom on his part, but rather because he never understood "that Axis rule of Egypt was likely to be far more oppressive than British".

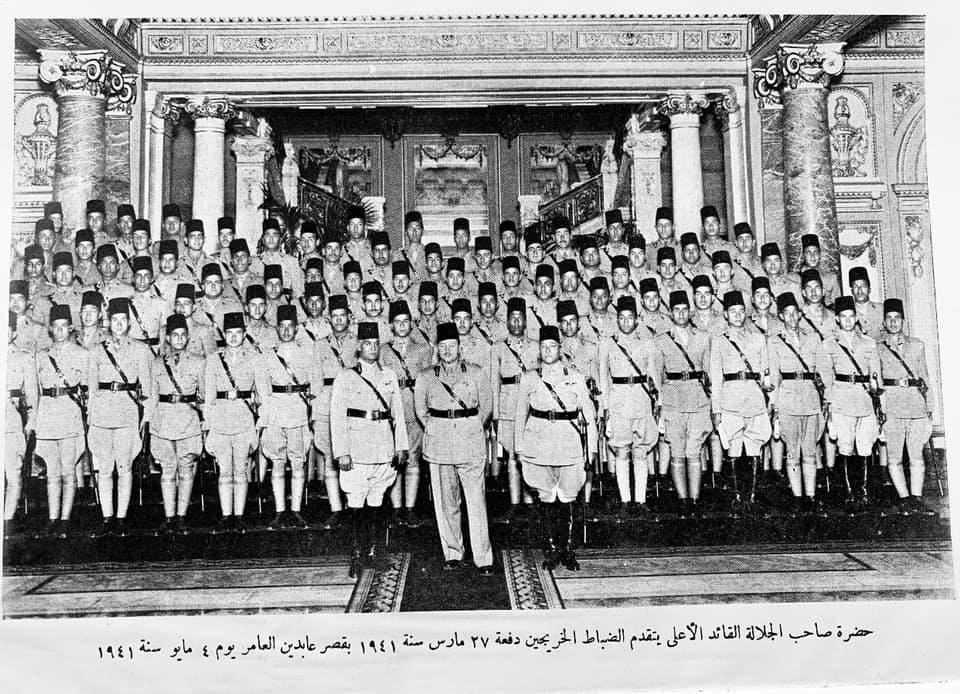
Farouk with Military academy graduates, 1941

During the hardships of the Second World War, criticism was levelled at Farouk for his lavish lifestyle. His decision not to put out the lights at his palace in Alexandria when the city was blacked out because of German and Italian bombing was deemed particularly offensive by the Egyptian people. This was a large contrast to the British royal family back in England, who were well known to have an opposite reaction to the bombings near their home. Owing to the continuing British occupation of Egypt, many Egyptians, Farouk included, were positively disposed towards Germany and Italy, and despite the presence of British troops, Egypt remained officially neutral until the final year of the war. Consequently, Farouk's Italian servants were not interned, and there is an unconfirmed story that Farouk told British Ambassador Sir Miles Lampson (who had an Italian wife), "I'll get rid of my Italians when you get rid of yours". Many Italians in Egypt, mostly men, were interned in British concentration camps, such as the notorious camp Fayed, 40 kilometres (25 mi) outside of Cairo. Treatment of these prisoners in those camps was extreme and physically excessively harsh, many losing inordinate amounts of body weight and contracting typhus. In January 1942, when Farouk was away on vacation, Lampson pressured Serry Pasha into breaking diplomatic relations with Vichy France. As the king was not consulted about the severing of ties with Vichy France, Farouk used this violation of the constitution as an excuse to dismiss Serry and announced he planned to appoint Maher as prime minister again. Serry knew that his government was likely to be defeated on a motion of no confidence when Parliament opened on 3 February 1942, and in the meantime demonstrations by students at Cairo University and Al-Azhar University had broken out, calling for a German victory.

Following a ministerial crisis in February 1942, the British government, through its ambassador in Egypt, Sir Miles Lampson, pressed Farouk to have a Wafd or Wafd-coalition government replace Hussein Sirri Pasha's government. Lampson had Sir Walter Monckton flown in from London to draft an abdication decree for Farouk to sign as Monckton had drafted the abdication decree for Edward VIII and it was agreed that Prince Muhammad Ali would become the new king. Lampson wanted to depose Farouk, but General Robert Stone and Oliver Lyttleton both argued that if Farouk agreed to appoint Nahas Pasha prime minister that the public reaction to "throwing the boy out for giving us at 9 p.m. the answer which we should have welcomed at 6 p.m." would be highly negative. Reluctantly, Lampson agreed that Farouk could stay if he agreed to make Nahas prime minister. Farouk asked his military how long the Egyptian Army could hold Cairo against the British and was told at most they could for two hours. On the night of 4 February 1942, soldiers surrounded Abdeen Palace in Cairo and Lampson presented Farouk with an ultimatum. While a battalion of infantry took up their positions around the palace with the roar of tanks could be heard in the distance, Lampson arrived at the Abdeen Palace in his Rolls-Royce together with General Stone. As the doors to Abdeen Palace were locked, one of the officers present used his revolver to shoot open the door and Lampson stormed in, demanding to see the king at once. Farouk initially started to sign the abdication degree that Lampson had placed on his desk, but Prince Hassanein, who was present as a sort of mediator, intervened and spoke to Farouk in Turkish, a language which he knew that Lampson did not speak. Unknown to Lampson, three of Farouk's Albanian bodyguards were hiding behind the curtains in his study with orders to shoot the ambassador if he should touch Farouk. Prince Hassanein's intervention had its effect, and Farouk turned to Lampson to say he was giving in. Farouk capitulated, and Nahhas formed a government shortly thereafter. However, the humiliation meted out to Farouk, and the actions of the Wafd in co-operating with the British and taking power, lost support for both the British and the Wafd among both civilians and, more importantly, the Egyptian military. At the time, the incident caused the Egyptian people to rally around their king, on 11 February 1942 (his birthday by Western standards), he received was loudly cheered by the crowd on Abdeen Square. General Stone wrote Farouk a letter of apology for the incident. Air Marshal William Sholto Douglas wrote that Lampson had made a huge error in "treating King Farouk as if he were nothing but a naughty and rather silly boy... Farouk was naughty and he was still very young... but to my mind, and taking a hard-headed view, he was also the King of Egypt".

In April 1942, at a luncheon with Lampson and King George II of Greece, Farouk refused to speak to Lampson and told George that he would be wasting his time meeting the Wafd ministers as they were all ces canailles ("these scoundrels"). On 2 July 1942, Lampson visited the Abdeen Palace to tell Farouk that there was a real possibility of Axis forces taking Cairo and suggested that the king should flee to Khartoum if the Afrika Corps took Cairo. Farouk who had no intention of decamping to Khartoum simply walked out of the room. After the Battle of El Alamein, the Axis forces were driven out of Egypt and back into Libya, which caused Farouk to change his views over to a markedly pro-British direction. Air Marshal Douglas, one of the few British people whom Farouk was friends with, gave him the uniform of a RAF officer, which became the king's favourite uniform.

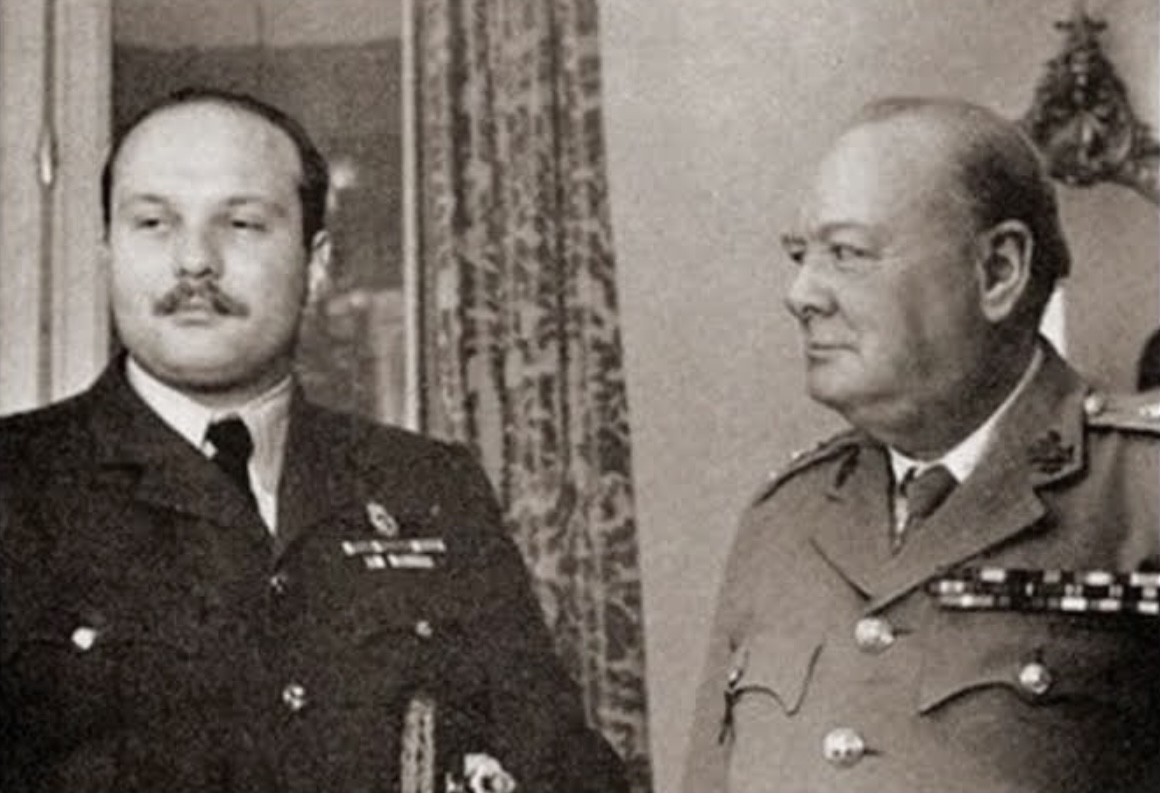
Farouk meeting Winston Churchill in Cairo, 1942

Farouk also met various Allied leaders. South African Prime Minister Jan Christian Smuts called Farouk "surprisingly intelligent". U.S. Senator Richard Russell Jr., who represented Georgia, a cotton-growing state, found he had much in common with Farouk and stated he was "an attractive, clear-eyed young man ... very much on the job ... well above the ordinary run of rulers". The American financier and diplomat Winthrop W. Aldrich discovered that Farouk was very informed about the workings of the international gold market, saying the king had a sharp eye for business. Air Marshal Douglas wrote "I began to genuinely like Farouk. There was no indication then there was anything that was vicious about him, although at times his flippancy became annoying. Another failing of his was that he appeared to be almost fanatically keen on acquiring great wealth ... he revealed all too clearly his shortsightedness in stating openly that one of his main interests in life was to increase that fortune. This led him into currying favor with the rich people in Egypt, as they did with him, at the expense of the common people, in whom he had little or no interest". Douglas concluded that the king was "an intelligent young man ... he was by no means the fool that he appeared to be through the stupid way in which he quite often behaved in public". However, a meeting with the British prime minister Winston Churchill in August 1942 when Farouk stole his watch did not make the best impression; though Farouk later returned the watch, presenting his theft of Churchill's watch as merely a practical joke, saying he knew "the English had a great sense of humor". Farouk had pardoned a thief in exchange for teaching him how to be a pickpocket, a skill that Farouk used on Churchill, much to the latter's chagrin.

In the time honored fashion, the Wafd government headed by Nahas proved to be an extremely corrupt and Nahas is widely considered to be one of the most corrupt Egyptian prime ministers of all time. Nahas fell out with his patron, Makram Ebeid, and expelled him from the Wafd at the instigation of his wife. Ebeid retaliated with The Black Book, a detailed expose published in the spring of 1943 listing 108 cases of major corruption involving Nahas and his wife. On 29 March 1943, Ebeid visited the Abdeen Palace to present Farouk with a copy of The Black Book and asked that he dismiss Nahas for corruption. Farouk attempted to use the furor caused by The Black Book as an excuse to dismiss the extremely unpopular Nahas, who had become Egypt's most hated man, but Lampson warned him via Prince Hassanein that he would be deposed if he dismissed his prime minister. Lampson in a dispatch to Sir Anthony Eden, who was once again Foreign Secretary, argued that Egypt needed political calm and to allow Farouk to dismiss Nahas would cause chaos as the latter would start "ranting" against the British. General Stone recommended that Lampson not be allowed to depose Farouk under the grounds that such a step was likely to cause anti-British rioting in Egypt which would require putting down, which Stone was opposed to on public relations grounds.

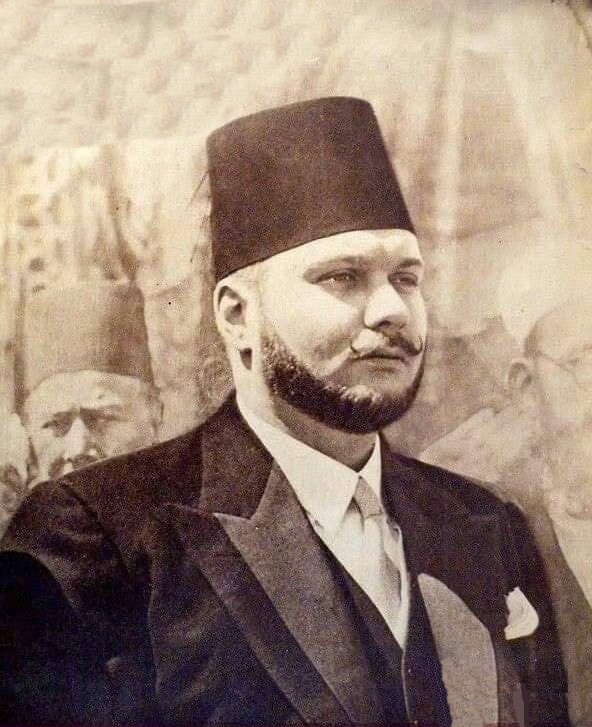
Farouk during Mawlid (prophet Muhammad's birthday) in 1943.

In November 1943, Farouk went driving with Pulli in his red Cadillac to Ismalia to see a yacht he just purchased when he was involved in an automobile incident when his attempt to bypass a British Army truck by speeding caused him to hit another car head-on. An attempt to place Farouk on a stretcher failed when the overweight king turned out to be too heavy, causing the stretcher to break under his weight. Farouk had suffered two broken ribs as a result of the car accident, but he liked being in a British Army hospital so much, flirting with the nurses, that he pretended to be injured far longer than what he really was. As a result, Farouk missed the Cairo Conference when the U.S. President Franklin D. Roosevelt, the British Prime Minister Winston Churchill and the Chinese Generalissimo Chiang Kai-shek all arrived in Cairo to discuss war plans against Japan for 1944, though he appeared to have no regrets, preferring to spend his time flirting with the nurses and buying them gifts that were worth more than their annual salaries.

Reflecting a continuing interest in the Balkans, the region where his family came from, Farouk by 1943 hosted King Zog I of Albania, King Peter II of Yugoslavia and King George II of Greece, telling all three kings that he wanted Egypt to play a role in the Balkans after the war, as he was proud of his Albanian ancestry.

In late 1943, Farouk started a policy giving support to student and working men's association and in early 1944 paid a visit to Upper Egypt, when he donated money to victims of the malaria epidemic. In April 1944, Farouk attempted to sack Nahas as prime minister over the latter's response to the malaria epidemic in Upper Egypt. Reflecting the importance of controlling patronage in Egypt, Nahas Pasha had gone on a separate relief tour of Upper Egypt apart from the king and founded a relief organization, the Nahas Institute, in his own name instead of the king as was normal to treat the thousands sickened with malaria. Farouk told Lampson that "there could not be two kings in Egypt" and the "semi-royal" nature of Nahas's tour of Upper Egypt was an insult to him. Farouk attempted to soften the blow by announcing the new prime minister would be the well known Anglophile Prince Hassanein, but Lampson refused to accept him. Lampson attempted to have Farouk deposed again, sending off a telegram to Churchill advising him to take "direct control" of Egypt. Lampson once again threatened Farouk, who remained flippant and dismissive. When Prince Hassanein tried to persuade Lampson to accept the dismissal of the deeply corrupt Wafd government as an improvement, the ambassador was unmoved, leading the normally Anglophile Hassanein to say the Egyptians were getting tired of British influence in their internal affairs. By 1944, the withdrawal of much the British garrison in Egypt together with the view that to depose Farouk would make a nationalist martyr led to much of the British Foreign Office feeling that Lampson's constant plans to replace the king would do more harm than good. Lord Moyne, the junior British foreign minister in charge of Middle Eastern affairs, told Lampson that his plans to depose Farouk in 1944 would damage Britain's moral position in the world and force the British to send more troops to Egypt to put down the expected riots when the main concern was the Italian theatre of operations. General Bernard Paget rejected Lampson's plans to depose Farouk as the Egyptian Army was loyal to him, and to depose the king would mean going to war against Egypt, which Paget called an unnecessary distraction.

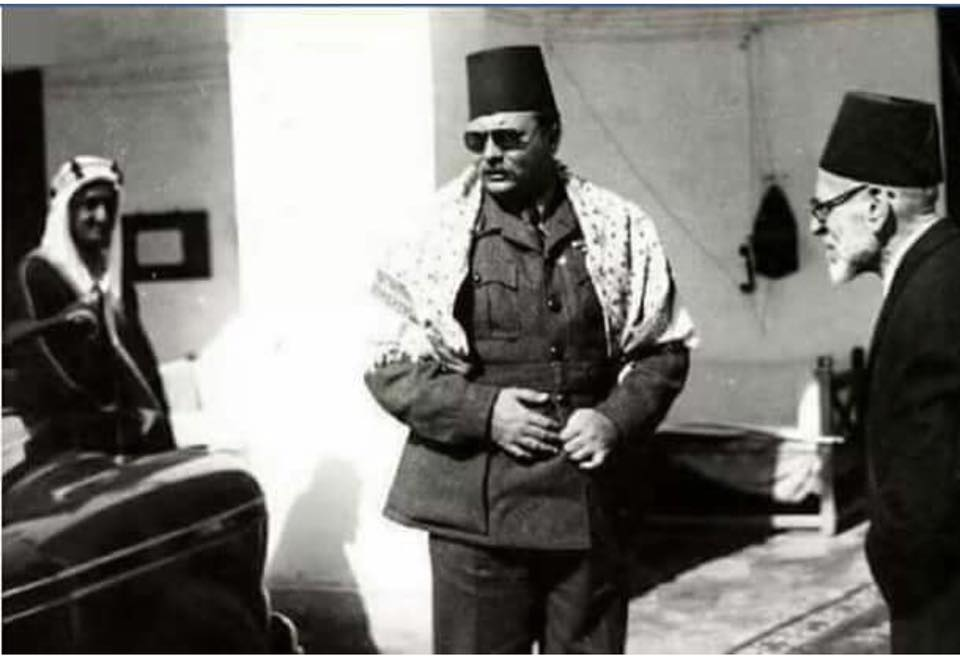
Farouk standing in front of the Egyptian Tekkiyah at Medina, Saudi Arabia in 1945

The day before Farouk was tentatively due to be deposed, Prince Hassanein arrived at the British Embassy with a letter for Lampson saying: "I am commanded by His Majesty to inform Your Excellency that he has decided to leave the present Government in Office for the time being". As Nahas became unpopular, he sought to embrace Arab nationalism to rally support, having Egypt join the Arab League in October 1944 and speaking more and more about "the Palestine question". In October 1944, when Lampson went away for a vacation in South Africa, Farouk finally dismissed Nahas as prime minister on 8 October 1944, and replaced him with Ahmed Maher, the brother of Ali Maher. The dismissal of Nahas was seen by Lampson as a personal defeat, who complained in his diary that he would never have a politician "in our pocket" like him again, and was seen as a decisive turning point when Farouk had finally outwitted Lampson. But at the same time, Lampson admitted that Nahas by his corruption had become a liability, and that Britain could not continue to support a corrupt government in the long run, as the British people would not tolerate going to war with Egypt to keep someone like Nahas in office.

On 6 November 1944, Lord Moyne was assassinated in Cairo by two members of the extreme right-wing Zionist group, Lehi, better known as the Stern Gang. The two assassins, Eliyahu Bet-Zuri and Eliyahu Hakim, gunned down Lord Moyne and his chauffeur, but were then captured by the Cairo police. Afterwards, Bet-Zuri and Hakim were tried and sentenced to death by an Egyptian court. Farouk came under strong pressure from American Zionist groups to pardon the two assassins while Lampson pressured him not to pardon the assassins. For a time, Farouk escaped the matter by sailing on the royal yacht Mahroussa to Saudi Arabia to go on the haji to Mecca and meet King Ibn Saud. In March 1945, the assassins of Lord Moyne were hanged, and for the first time, Farouk was accused in the United States of being anti-Semitic.

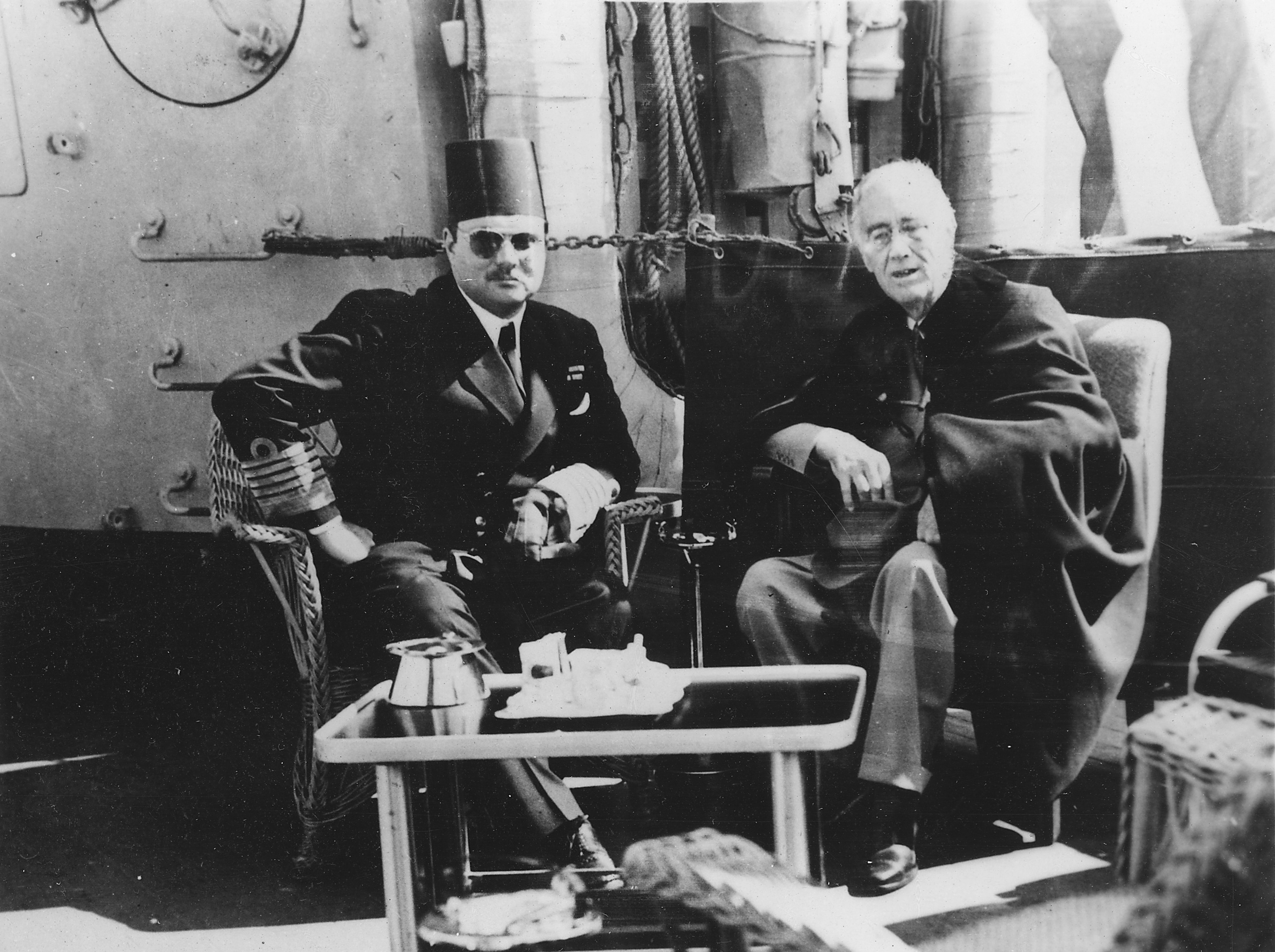
Farouk and Franklin D. Roosevelt at Great Bitter Lake, Egypt, 1945

Farouk declared war on the Axis Powers, long after the fighting in Egypt's Western Desert had ceased. On 13 February 1945, Farouk met President Franklin D. Roosevelt of the United States on abroad the cruiser USS Quincy, anchored in the Great Bitter Lake. Farouk seemed confused by the purpose of the meeting with Roosevelt, talking much about how after the war he hoped more American tourists would visit Egypt and Egyptian-American trade would increase. Though the meeting consisted mostly of pleasantries, Roosevelt did give Farouk the gift of a Douglas C-47 plane, to add to his airplane collection. After meeting Roosevelt, the king met Churchill who according to Lampson:

told Farouk that he should take a definite line in regard to the improvement of the social conditions in Egypt. He ventured to affirm that nowhere in the world were the conditions of extreme wealth and extreme poverty so glaring. What an opportunity for a young Sovereign to come forward and champion the interests and living conditions of his people. Why not take from the rich Pashas some of their superabundant wealth and devote it to the improvement of the living conditions of the fellaheen?.

Farouk was more interested in learning if Egypt would be allowed to join the new United Nations and learned from Churchill that only nations that were at war with the Axis powers would be allowed to join the United Nations, which would replace the League of Nations after the war.

In 1919, it had been a great humiliation for the Egyptians that Egypt had been excluded from the Paris Peace Conference that led to the Treaty of Versailles and the League of Nations, causing the revolution of 1919. Farouk was determined that this time that Egypt would be a founding member of the United Nations, which would show the world that the country was ending British influence in Egyptian affairs. On 24 February 1945, Prime Minister Maher had the Chamber of Deputies issue declarations of war against Germany and Japan, and as he was leaving the Chamber, he was assassinated by Mahmoud Isawi, a member of the pro-Axis Young Egypt Society. Isawi was shaking Maher's hand and then pulled out his handgun, shooting the prime minister three times while screaming that he had betrayed Egypt by declaring war on Germany and Japan. When Lampson arrived at the Koubbeh Palace to see Farouk, he wrote he was shocked instead to see instead "it was the wicked Aly Maher who was receiving condolences". As a result, Egypt attended the peace conference in San Francisco in April 1945 that founded the United Nations.

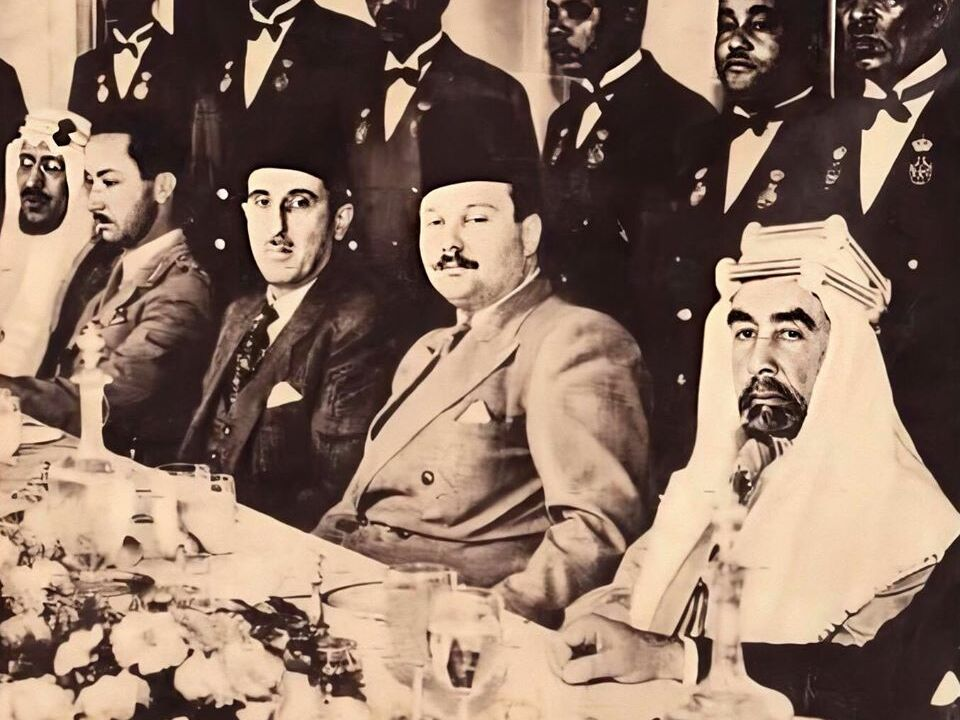
One side of the Anshas conference called upon by king Farouk. From right to left: Abdullah I of Jordan, Farouk, Syrian president Shukri al-Quwatli, Emir Abd al-Ilah of Iraq, and crown prince Saud of Saudi Arabia, 1946

The new prime minister, Mahmoud El Nokrashy Pasha, demanded that the British finally keep the terms of the 1936 treaty by pulling out of the Nile river valley while university students rioted in Cairo demanding the British leave Egypt altogether. Lampson by 1945 was widely seen in Whitehall as a man with an unrealistic view of Anglo-Egyptian relations and only Lampson's friendship with Churchill kept him on as an ambassador in Cairo. The new Labour government that came into office in July 1945 wanted a new relationship with Egypt, and Farouk let it be known he wanted a new British ambassador. The new Labour Foreign Secretary, Ernest Bevin, a man of working-class origins, found the aristocratic Lampson to be a snob, and moreover Lampson's vehement disapproval of the Labour government's policy towards India further isolated him. For all these reasons, Bevin was well disposed to Farouk's entreaties to replace Lampson. Farouk had vaguely promised to carry out social reforms, a major concern in London as the wartime inflation had led to increases in support for the Egyptian Communist Party on the left and the Muslim Brotherhood on the right, and was willing to negotiate a new relationship with Britain. Moreover, once the war had ended, the Wafd had returned to its traditional anti-British political position, which led Whitehall to conclude that Farouk was London's best hope of keeping Egypt in the British sphere of influence. The Egyptian ambassador in London passed on messages from Farouk blaming Lampson all the problems in Anglo-Egyptian relations, and stated that Farouk would be willing to return to his father's policies of opposing the Wafd and of seeking British "moral support" after the war.

== Decline ==
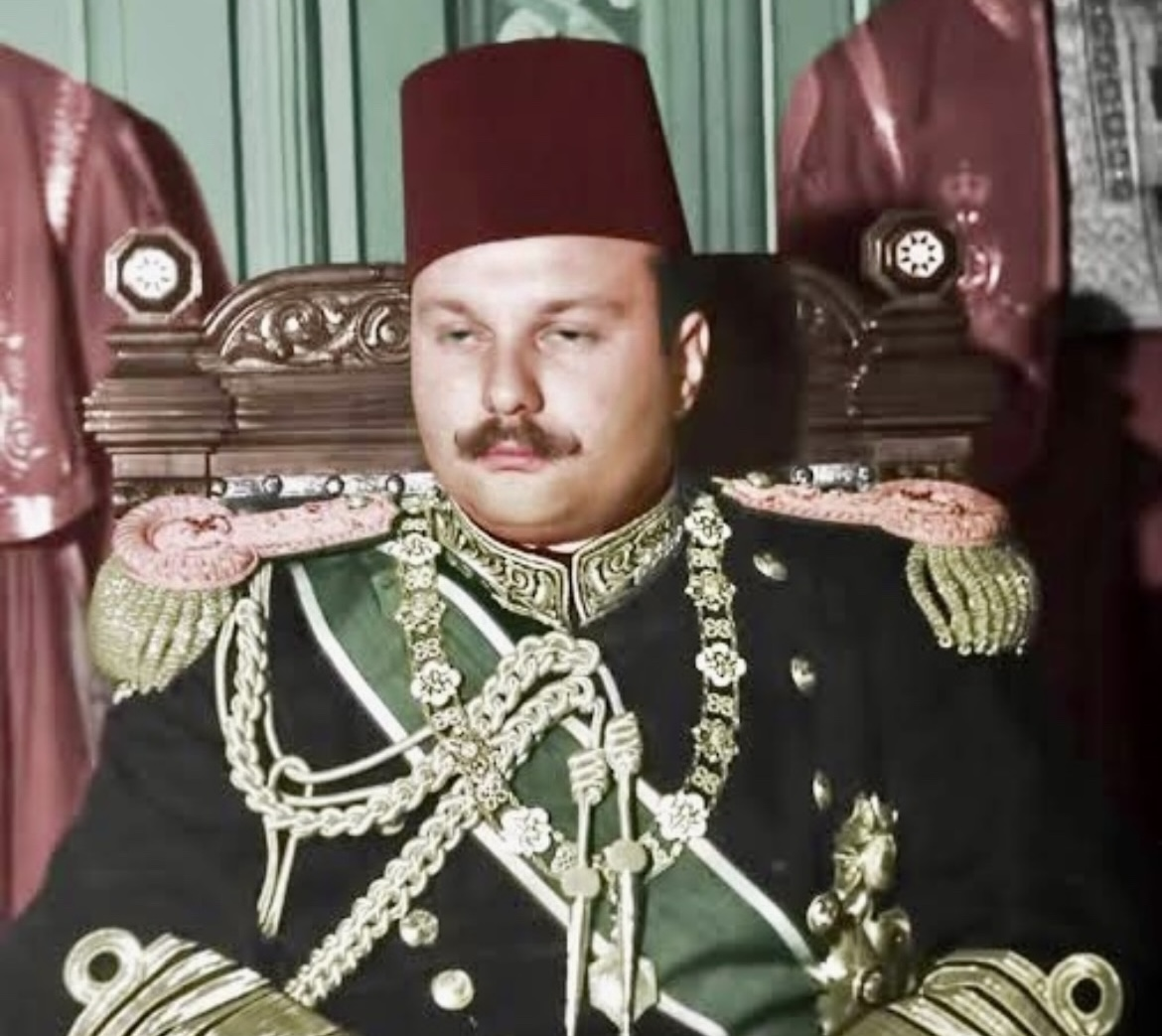
Farouk attending a royal dinner in Cairo, 1946

=== Economic and social conditions ===
Egypt ended the Second World War as the richest country in the Middle East, owing largely to the high prices of cotton. In 1945 in a reversal of the usual roles, Egypt was a creditor nation to the United Kingdom, with the British government owing Egypt £400 million. The stark income disparities of Egyptian society meant the wealth of Egypt was very unequally distributed with the kingdom having 500 millionaires while the fellaheen lived in extreme poverty. In 1945, a medical study showed that 80% of Egyptians suffered from bilharzia and ophthalmia, both diseases that were easily preventable and treatable. The authors of the study noted both bilharzia and ophthalmia were spread by waterborne parasitic worms, and the prevalence of both diseases could easily be eliminated in Egypt by providing people with safe sources of drinking water. The bumbling response of the Egyptian authorities to the cholera epidemic in 1947 that killed 80,000 people was an additional cause of criticism as cholera is caused by drinking water contaminated with feces, and the entire epidemic could have been avoided if only ordinary Egyptians had sources of clean drinking water. King Farouk had traditionally posed as the friend of the poor, but by 1945 such gestures that the king liked to engage in such as throwing gold coins at the fellaheen or dropping ping-pong balls from his plane that could be redeemed for candy were no longer felt to be sufficient. Increasingly, demands were being made that the king should engage in social reforms instead of theatrical gestures like handing out gold coins during royal visits, and as Farouk was unwilling to consider land reform or improving the water sanitation, his popularity began to decline. Farouk's social life also started to damage his image. The American journalist Norbert Schiller wrote "Farouk was seen frequently womanizing at the hottest night spots in Cairo and Alexandria. In Egypt, the king's gallivanting was put under wraps by the palace censorship office, but abroad pictures of a fat balding king surrounded by Europe's social elite were splashed across the world's tabloids." Farouk's only act of self-restraint was that he refused to drink alcohol as however much his lifestyle departed from the one recommended by the Quran, he could not bring himself to break the Muslim prohibition on alcohol.

=== Court politics and the kitchen cabinet ===
Farouk's chief advisers in ruling Egypt starting in 1945 were his "kitchen cabinet" consisting of his right-hand man, Antonio Pulli together with the king's Lebanese press secretary Karim Thabet; Elias Andraous, an ethnic Greek from Alexandria whom Farouk valued for his business skills; and Edmond Galhan, a Lebanese arms dealer whose official title was "general purveyor to the Royal Palaces", but whose real job was to engage in black market activities for the king. Prince Hassanein warned Farouk against his "kitchen cabinet", saying all of them were greedy, unscrupulous men who abused the king's trust to enrich themselves, but Farouk disregarded his advice. In February 1946, Prince Hassanein was killed in an automobile accident, and a secret marriage contract between him and Queen Nazli was found that was dated 1937, which infuriated Farouk. After much lobbying on the part of Farouk, the new Labour government in London decided to replace Lampson with Sir Ronald Campbell as the British ambassador in Cairo, and on 9 March 1946, Lampson left Cairo, much to the king's glee.

=== British withdrawal and Sudan ===
In May 1946, Farouk granted asylum to former king of Italy, Victor Emmanuel III, who had abdicated on 9 May 1946. Farouk was repaying a family debt as Victor Emmanuel's father, King Umberto I, had granted asylum to Farouk's grandfather, Ismail the Magnificent, in 1879, but as Victor Emmanuel had supported the Fascist regime of Mussolini, his arrival in Egypt did much damage to Farouk's image. In June 1946, Farouk granted asylum to Amin al-Husseini, the Grand Mufti of Jerusalem, who escaped from France where he was being held on charges of being a war criminal, arriving in Egypt on a forged passport. Farouk did not care that al-Husseini was urgently wanted in Yugoslavia on charges of being a Nazi war criminal for his role in organizing the massacres of Bosnian Serbs and Jews. Farouk wanted the British to keep the 1936 agreement by pulling their troops out of Cairo and Alexandria, and felt having notoriously Anglophobic rabble-rousing Grand Mufti in Egypt would be a useful way of threatening them. However, the way that Farouk addressed al-Hussenini as the "king of Jerusalem" appeared to suggest that he envisioned the Grand Mufti as the future leader of a Palestinian state. Starting in June 1946, the British did finally pull out of the Nile river valley and henceforward the only place the British Army were stationed at in Egypt was at the gigantic base around the Suez Canal. In August 1946, the British pulled out of the Citadel in Cairo. By September 1946, the British pull-out from the Nile valley was complete. Farouk continued to press the British to leave Egypt altogether, but the question of who would control the Sudan led to the collapse of the talks in December 1946. Farouk considered the Sudan to be part of Egypt, and wanted the Anglo-Egyptian condominium over the Sudan to end at the same time that the British would pull out of Egypt, which the British were unwilling to accept.

=== Palestine and al-Husseini ===
Having the charismatic al-Husseini in Egypt had the effect of focusing attention on the Palestine issue, a matter which most Egyptians had previously ignored, all the more so when al-Husseini made an alliance with Hassan al-Banna, the Supreme Guide of the fundamentalist Muslim Brotherhood, which was rapidly becoming the most powerful mass movement in Egypt with over a million members. Farouk himself welcomed the Grand Mufti to royal receptions, and his speeches calling for jihad against Zionism did much to put the "Palestine Question" on the public agenda. Farouk himself was not personally anti-Semitic, having a Jewish mistress, the singer Lilianne Cohen, better known by her stage name Camelia, but given increasing discontent with the very stark income inequalities in Egypt, Farouk felt taking a militantly anti-Zionist line was the best way of distracting public attention. At the Royal Automobile Club in Cairo, Farouk engaged in all night gambling sessions with rich Egyptian Jews despite his professed anti-Zionism and often joked: "Bring me my Zionist enemies so I can take their money!" In December 1947, a demonstration organized by the Muslim Brotherhood in Cairo calling for Egyptian intervention in Palestine drew 100,000 people. In November 1947, when Britain announced it was terminating the Palestine Mandate in May 1948, a civil war erupted between the Jewish and Arab populations of Palestine, and the fighting was very extensively covered by the Egyptian media. The stories about atrocities, both real and imagined, against the Palestinians, served to greatly agitate the Egyptian people. Furthermore, there was a widespread belief in Egypt that once the British left Palestine and the Zionists proclaimed a new state to be called Israel, that the resulting war would be an easy "march on Jerusalem" lasting only a few days. In December 1947, a summit of the leaders of the Arab League was held in Cairo to discuss what to do when the Mandate of Palestine came to an end in May 1948. King Abdullah I of Jordan wanted all of Palestine for himself and dismissed Farouk as a pseudo-Arab who should not even be attending the summit, saying with reference to Farouk's Albanian ancestry: "You do not make a gentleman out of a Balkan farmer's son simply by making him a king".

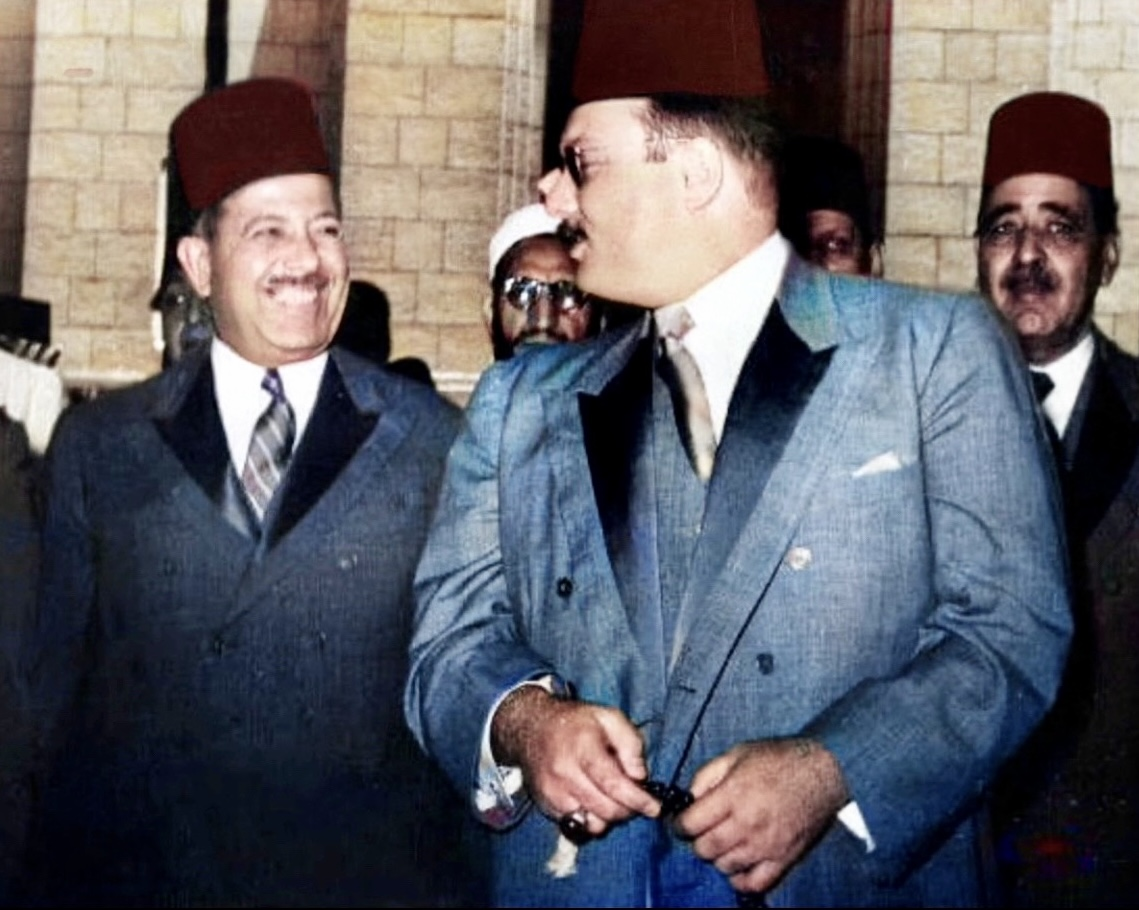
Farouk and his Prime Minister El Nokrashy Pasha in an official visit, 1947

Reflecting the influence of King Ibn' Saud of Saudi Arabia who spoke in the same way, Farouk often described Zionism as a ploy by the Soviet Union to take over the Middle East, calling the Zionists Jewish "communists" from Eastern Europe who were working on Moscow's instructions to "wreck" the traditional order in the Middle East. Both Farouk and Ibn' Saud detested Abdullah, and both preferred that a Palestinian state headed by the Grand Mufti of Jerusalem be created rather than see Palestine annexed to Jordan or becoming a Jewish state.

=== Road to the 1948 war ===
Farouk did not bother to tell the prime minister Mahmoud El Nokrashy Pasha about his decision for war with Israel, who only learned of his decision a few days before the war was due to start on 15 May 1948, from the Defense Minister and Chief of the General Staff. Farouk was so convinced that the war would be a victorious "march on Jerusalem" that he had already started planning the victory parade in Cairo before the war started. Farouk was described as "like some boy playing with so many lead soldiers" as he involved himself deeply in the military planning, personally deciding where his army would march when it invaded Palestine. As late as 13 May 1948, Norakshy Pasha was assuring foreign diplomats that Egypt would not attack Israel when it was expected to be proclaimed on 15 May, and Egypt's intervention in the war took most observers by surprise. In the diplomacy in the run-up to the war, Egypt was generally seen as a moderate state with Egyptian diplomats repeatedly saying that their country was opposed to a military solution to the "Palestine Question". Nokrashy in 1947 asked in private if it was possible for the United States to take over the Palestine Mandate when the British left, saying he did not want a war.

=== Defeat in the Arab-Israeli War ===
In May 1948, Prime Minister Mahmoud El Nokrashy Pasha advised Farouk against going to war with Israel, warning that the Egyptian Army was not ready. Farouk overruled him, fearing the growing popularity of the Muslim Brotherhood, which was demanding Egyptian intervention in Palestine. He believed that refusing to fight could strengthen the Brotherhood and threaten his rule.

The war ended in a major defeat for Egypt and dealt a serious blow to Farouk's prestige. Many officers were angered by allegations that Edmond Galhan, a Lebanese arms dealer and member of Farouk's informal "kitchen cabinet", had profited by selling defective surplus Italian rifles to the army. Although the rifles were not the sole cause of Egypt's defeat, many Egyptians became fixated on the scandal, believing that Egypt would have been victorious had the army not been supplied with defective rifles. Six years after the Abdeen Palace incident of 1942, Egypt's defeat led many Egyptians to reinterpret the episode as evidence of the king's weakness and poor leadership.

The Muslim Brotherhood, which had strongly supported intervention in Palestine, turned against the government after Egypt's defeat. In October 1948, members of the organization assassinated the Cairo police chief and later the governor of Cairo Province.

Violence escalated on 28 December 1948, when Nokrashy Pasha was assassinated by a Brotherhood member disguised as a police officer. Egypt signed an armistice with Israel the following month, retaining only the Gaza Strip.

In February 1949, Hassan al-Banna, the founder and Supreme Guide of the Muslim Brotherhood, called for Farouk's overthrow. Shortly afterward, he was shot by a Cairo policeman. After being taken to hospital, he was denied a blood transfusion and died later the same day. Shortly afterward, Amin al-Husseini, the Grand Mufti of Jerusalem and a prominent Palestinian Arab nationalist leader, left Egypt for Lebanon.

=== American perceptions of Farouk and Nahas ===
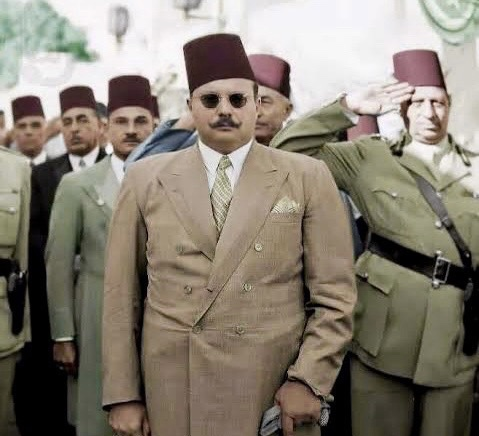
Farouk in 1948

In September 1949, when Jefferson Caffery arrived in Cairo as the new U.S. ambassador and met Farouk for the first time, the king told Caffery (who came from Louisiana) that just as the South had its blacks good only for picking cotton, so too did Egypt have its fellaheen likewise only good for picking cotton. Caffery reported in his cable to Washington that he was appalled that Nahas, whom Caffery called the stupidest and most corrupt politician in Egypt, was now prime minister. Caffery stated that Nahas was unqualified to be prime minister because of his "completely total ignorance of the facts of life as they apply to the situation today", giving the example:

Most observers are willing to concede that Nahas knows of the existence of Korea, but I have found no one who would be willing to seriously contend that he is aware of the fact that Korea borders on Red China. His ignorance is as colossal as it is appalling ... At the time of my interview with Nahas he was totally unconscious of the subject which I was discussing. The only ray of light which penetrated was the fact that I wanted something from him. This prompted the street politician's response of "aidez-nous et nous vous aiderons".

Caffery called Nahas a venal "street politician" whose only platform was the "tried and true formula of 'Evacuation and Unity of the Nile Valley'" and stated the only positive aspect of him as prime minister was that "we can get anything which we want from him if we are willing to pay for it". Nahas as prime minister proved to be as corrupt and venal as he was during his previous times in office, going on a rampage of rapacious looting of the public coffers to enrich himself and his even more greedy wife.

=== The cotton boom and rising discontent ===
The Korean War caused a shortfall in the American cotton production as young men were called up for national service, causing a cotton boom in Egypt. As the international prices for cotton rose, Egyptian landlords forced their tenant farmers to grow more cotton at the expense of food, leading to major food shortages and inflation in Egypt. In face of the corrupt Nahas government, the Egyptian people looked to their king for leadership who in the meantime had departed for France for a two-month-long bachelor party. Farouk's biographer, William Stadiem, wrote about how the king in 1950 "went on the most excessively lavish, self-indulgent bachelor party in the annals of sybaritism".

=== Farouk's wealth and European tour ===
In 1950, Farouk's fortune was estimated to be about £50 million or about US$140 million, making him into one of the world's richest men, and a billionaire many times over in today's money. Farouk's wealth and his lifestyle made the centre of media attention all over the world. In August 1950, Farouk visited France to stay at the casino at Deauville for his bachelor party, leaving Alexandria on his yacht Fakr el Bihar with an Egyptian destroyer as an escort and landed at Marseille. Farouk, together with his entourage consisting of his "kitchen cabinet", 30 Albanian bodyguards, assorted Egyptian secretaries and doctors, Sudanese food tasters and various other followers travelled across the French countryside in a column of 7 Cadillacs surrounded by motorcycle-riding bodyguards and an airplane flying overhead with orders to land in case Farouk wanted to fly instead.

Upon the king arriving in Deauville, a media circus began as hundreds of journalists from Europe and North America descended on Deauville to report on Farouk's every doing as he stayed at the Hotel du Golf with his entourage occupying 25 rooms. Journalists watched on as the corpulent king gorged himself on food, eating in one single meal dishes of sole à crème, côte de veau à la crème, framboises à la crème, and champignons à la crème, each dish tasted in advance by Farouk's Sudanese food tasters. At his first night at the casino in Deauville, Farouk won 20 million francs (about $57,000 U.S. dollars) gambling at baccarat, and on his second night won 15 million francs. As Farouk spent extravagant sums of money during his visit to Deauville, staying at the casino every night until 5 am, he earned himself a reputation for flamboyant high living that never went away.

From Deauville, Farouk went to Biarritz, where he stayed at the Hotel du Palais and resumed his friendship with the Duke of Windsor as the former King Edward VIII was now known. Farouk then crossed over to San Sebastian in Spain to attend a film festival with four "of his ladies of the moment" as the British ambassador to Spain called them. Farouk's next stop was Cannes, where he engaged on the night of 22 September in a $80,000 game of chemin de fer at the Palm Beach Casino with the Nawab of Palanpur, the Italian industrialist Gianni Agnelli, the Hollywood mogul Jack L. Warner and the British industrialist Myers "Lucky Mickie" Hyman. Hyman won the game and then promptly died of a heart-attack, leading to newspaper headlines such as "Lucky Mickie Beats Farouk-and Dies!" Finally, Farouk ended his bachelor party in San Remo in Italy where he purchased a number of Roman antiques at an auction to add to his collection and afterwards arrived in Alexandria in October 1950.

=== Warnings of unrest ===
Upon his return, Farouk received an anonymous public letter from the "opposition" which warned "a revolt is near; that would not only destroy those who are unjust but would leave the country in a state of financial, moral and political bankruptcy". The letter warned:

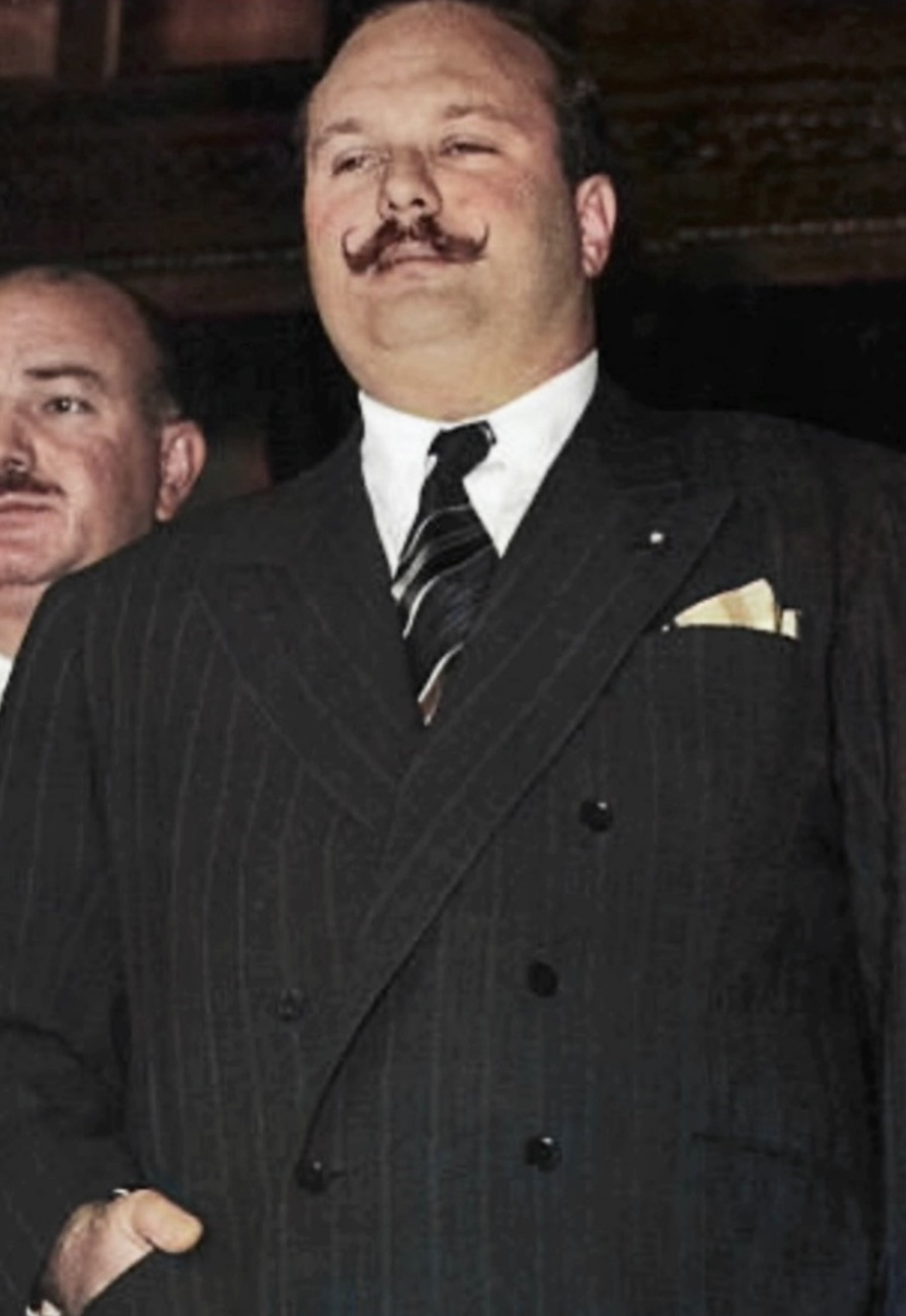
Farouk in 1951

Circumstances have placed in the palace certain officials who do not deserve that honor. These ill-advised and mishandle matters. Some of them have even come under suspicion that they are implicated in the arms scandal effecting our valiant army. The belief prevails that justice will be incapable of touching these officials, just as the belief has prevailed ... that Parliamentary government has become mere ink on paper. The world press describes us as a public that bears injustice slightly and says we do not know that we are being maltreated and driven like animals. God knows that our breasts are boiling with anger, and that only a little hope restrains us ... The country remembers the happy days when Your Majesty was the honest good shepherd. All the hopes of the country were concentrated on Your Majesty. No occasion passed when the country did not demonstrate its loyalty and sincerity to Your Majesty.

=== Abrogation of the Anglo-Egyptian Treaty ===
On 17 October 1951, the Egyptian government got Parliamentary approval to cancel the 1936 Anglo-Egyptian Treaty. Nahas told Parliament: "It was for Egypt that I signed the 1936 treaty and it is for Egypt that I call on you to abrogate it". As a result, the British forces in the Suez Canal were considered enemy forces and King Farouk was declared "King of Egypt and Sudan". This title was not recognised by many countries, and Egypt entered diplomatic debates as well as internal political unrest. As the British refused to leave their base around the Suez Canal, the Egyptians cut off all food and water to the base, ordered a boycott of British goods, recalled all of the Egyptian workers on the base and began guerrilla attacks, turning the area around the Suez Canal into a war zone.

=== The Free Officers emerge ===
In December 1951, Farouk backed General Sirri Amer for the president of the Cairo Officers' Club, and in a surprise upset, Amer was defeated in the election by General Mohamed Naguib, which was the first public sign of military dissatisfaction with the king as the secret Free Officers group had issued pamphlets urging other officers to vote for Naguib under the slogan "The Army says NO to Farouk". Farouk invalidated the results of the election and ordered an investigation of the Free Officers.

=== The Battle of Ismailia ===
On 24 January 1952, Egyptian guerrillas attacked the British base at the Suez Canal, during which the Egyptian Auxiliary Police were observed helping the guerrillas. In response, General George Erskine on 25 January had British tanks and infantry surround the auxiliary police station in Ismailia and gave the police an hour to surrender their arms under the grounds the police were arming the guerrillas. The police commander called the Interior Minister, Fouad Serageddin, Nahas's right-hand man, who was smoking cigars in his bath at the time, to ask what to do. Serageddin ordered the police to fight "to the last man and the last bullet". The resulting battle saw the police station levelled and 43 policemen killed together with 3 soldiers.

=== Black Saturday ===
The Battle of Ismailia outraged Egypt and the next day, 26 January 1952, was "Black Saturday", as the riot was known, that saw much of downtown Cairo which Ismail the Magnificent had rebuilt in the style of Paris, burned down. Shepheard's Hotel, which had long been a symbol of British power in Egypt, was burned down together with Groppi's, the most famous restaurant in Cairo, and Cicurel's, the most famous shopping centre. Serageddin ordered the police not to intervene during the Black Saturday riot, which saw 26 people killed and over 400 cinemas, cabarets, nightclubs, bars, restaurants and shops burned down in downtown Cairo. During the Black Saturday riot, Farouk was at the Abdeen Palace holding a luncheon attended by 600 guests to celebrate the birth of Fuad, and first became aware of the riot, when he noticed the black cloud of smoke rising up from downtown Cairo. Though Farouk ordered the Egyptian Army to put down the riot, it was too late and the fashionable and glamorous downtown Cairo built by his grandfather was destroyed that day. Farouk blamed the Wafd for the Black Saturday riot, and dismissed Nahas as prime minister the next day. Nahas and the rest of the Wafd leaders were so shocked by the fury of the "Black Saturday" riot that they meekly accepted Farouk's dismissal without protest.

=== Crisis of legitimacy ===
The "Black Saturday" riot was the beginning of a crisis of legitimacy in Egypt's institutions, including the monarchy, as the riot had starkly shown that most Egyptians did not feel their political system represented them. The American historian Joel Gordon wrote that "Black Saturday" forced "Egypt's political leaders to confront the severity of the crisis which the country faced". For the next six months, Farouk frequently shuffled prime ministers in an attempt to quell widespread demands for reform. The sense of crisis was captured by the widespread call for "salvation ministries" and a "just tyrant" that would end corruption, secure the evacuation of the British from the canal zone, and institute social reforms. Each of the prime ministers in the period January–July 1952 were judged by this criterion. The popular slogan was al-tathir qabl al-tahrir ("purification before liberation"), namely a leader who would make Egypt strong enough to force the British to leave. The Battle of Ismailia had shown that Egypt was too weak to militarily expel the British from the Canal zone, and the principal criticism of Farouk and Nahas was that they recklessly launched the "popular struggle" that Egypt could not hope to win. After the Battle of Ismailia, the feeling amongst the policial classes was that Egypt had to end the "popular struggle" and negotiate a British withdrawal, which underlined Egypt's weakness. Gordon called Farouk an unscrupulous leader with a "shrewd ability for statecraft" who could have posed as the "just tyrant" if it was not for his addiction to gluttony and partying. Sir Ralph Stevenson, the British ambassador, reported that "where own amusement and distraction are concerned, the king is fighting a losing battle against the man". Farouk's more responsible advisers like Hussein Serry Pasha together with Andraous of the "kitchen cabinet" tried their best to persuade the king to pose as the "just tyrant", but were constantly sabotaged by Pulli, Galhan and Thabet.

=== The search for reform ===
Nahas was replaced with Ali Maher who wanted to negotiate an exit agreement with the British and sought in turn to have the Wafd support his government to provide him with the necessary votes in parliament. One of Maher's first acts was an anti-inflation bill lowering the prices of basic staples and another was an anti-corruption bill, both of which were popular, but his unwillingness to prosecute the Wafd leaders for "Black Saturday" as Farouk wanted ensured his dismissal. On 2 March 1952, Maher was sacked and replaced with Ahmed Naguib el-Hilaly as prime minister. Hilaly had a reputation for incorruptibility and began a crackdown on corruption while having Serageddin arrested for charges of complicity in the "Black Saturday" riot. Hilaly also announced he was would pursue "purification before liberation", namely prosecute the Wafd leaders for corruption and "Black Saturday" before tackling the question of the British evacuation. In early May 1952, Farouk confessed to Caffery that Hilaly was his last hope as for once he did not have an alternative prime minister if he should have to sack him.

Thabet told Caffery that the prime minister's Fortunes Bill, which would require all past, present and future cabinet ministers to reveal the origins of their wealth would destroy the monarchy saying that

by purging the Wafd a veritable Pandora's box would be open and Egypt would go through a Roman holiday of charges and counter-charges which could only result in the man-in-the-street becoming aware of the fact that he has been ruled by crooks of various colorations for at least the past ten years ... such an awareness could only result in a further deterioration of the King's reputation with the people for having held him responsible for the naming of such men to his Cabinets ... His conclusion was that Hilay Pasha must be discharged from office immediately.

=== The fall of Hilaly ===
Owing to pressure from Thabet and rest of the "kitchen cabinet", Hilaly was sacked and replaced with Hussein Serry Pasha as prime minister on 1 July 1952. The popular rumour in Cairo had it that Ahmed 'Abbud, a Wafdist industrialist had paid a million Egyptian pound bribe to the king to sack Hilaly before he lost his monopoly on sugar production that he had bought from Nahas. Serry was well regarded, but his reputation as the "king's man" together with a genial, easy-going personality that made him unsuitable for the role of a "just tyrant" ensured that nobody took him seriously. Alone of the four prime ministers between January–July 1952, Serry sensed rising discontent in the ranks of the Army officer corps.

=== The Muhammad ancestry claim ===
Thabet then issued a press release claiming that genealogists had discovered that Farouk was a direct descendant of Muhammad, a claim that caused widespread mockery. General Mohammad Naguib wrote: "If there was any Arabic blood in Farouk's veins, it was so diluted that it couldn't possibly have been traced back to Mohammad and it was a sacrilege for anyone to have tried to do so".

=== American fears and the Free Officers ===
Farouk was always very anti-communist, but by 1952, a conviction arose among American decision-makers that based on the way that things were going in Egypt, a communist revolution was inevitable unless the government started social reforms at once. Caffery reported to Washington that the Egyptian Communist Party was growing in popularity and it was the Egyptian Communists who were behind the "Black Saturday" riot. In what became known as Project FF (Fat Fucker), officers of the Central Intelligence Agency led by Kermit Roosevelt Jr. were in contact with Free Officers. The extent and importance of American assistance to the Free Officers has been hotly debated by historians with the historian P. J. Vatikiotis maintaining that various CIA officers in their memoirs such as Miles Copeland Jr. in his 1969 autobiography The Game of Nations vastly exaggerated their role assisting the Free Officers.

== Overthrow ==
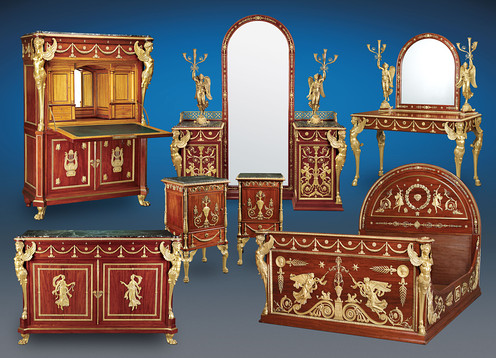
King Farouk seven-piece Empire bedroom suite crafted by the Parisian ébéniste Antoine Krieger

Farouk was widely condemned by his people for his corrupt and ineffectual governance, failure to expel foreign influence in Egypt's affairs, and the Egyptian army's failure in the 1948 Arab–Israeli War to prevent the creation of the state of Israel. Public discontent against Farouk rose to new levels, to the extent that the 1951 film Quo Vadis was banned in Egypt out of the fear the audiences would identify the fat Emperor Nero played by Peter Ustinov with Farouk. Farouk usually spent his summers in Alexandria to escape the summer heat in Cairo, and on the night of 20 July 1952 was gambling at the Royal Automobile Club when he received a phone call from Prime Minister Serry saying he had learned from a police spy that the Free Officers were planning to launch a coup sometime that summer. Serry also warned that Farouk's plans to appoint General Sirri Amer, a man deeply involved in the arms scandal, as War Minister would turn the officer corps against him; a plan that ultimately failed when even General Amer realised he was too unpopular with the officer corps to be an effective War Minister, causing him to refuse the appointment. When Farouk asked Serry to read out a list of who was involved in the conspiracy, he laughingly dismissed them as too junior to pose a threat, appointed his brother-in-law Ismail Chirine War Minister with orders to "clean up" the Army and returned to the Montaza Palace, unworried.

The appointment of Chirine as War Minister spurred the Free Officers into action, and on 22 July their leaders, General Muhammad Naguib and Colonel Gamal Abdel Nasser, decided on a coup the next day. Learning from one of his spies that the coup was due to begin tomorrow, at about 7 pm, Farouk ordered the arrest of all the Free Officers. Two Free Officers living in Alexandria were so convinced the coup would fail that evening of 23 July that they went to the Montaza palace to confess and seek a royal pardon. Finally, on the night of 23 July 1952, the Free Officers, led by Naguib and Nasser, staged a military coup that launched the Egyptian revolution of 1952. The Free Officers, knowing that warrants had been issued for their arrest, launched the coup that night, storming the staff headquarters in Cairo, killing two and wounding two on the night of 23 July and by about 1:30 am, Cairo was under their control.

In Alexandria, Farouk appealed to Caffery for help, accusing the Free Officers of all being Communists. Despite the strained relations with Britain, Farouk also appealed to Britain to intervene; the "Black Saturday" riot had convinced the Churchill government that to intervene in Egypt would entail guerrilla warfare in the Nile river valley, which ruled out intervention. Ali Maher, who sided with the Free Officers and was appointed prime minister by them, arrived in Alexandria on 24 July to tell Farouk that the Free Officers wanted Naguib to be War Minister and the dismissal of his "kitchen cabinet". On 25 July, Farouk went with a machine gun by his side to the Ras El Tin Palace, driving his red Mercedes-Benz down the streets of Alexandria at high speed. The Ras El Tin Palace was located right by Alexandria harbour under the guns of the Egyptian Navy's warships, as the Navy had stayed loyal. Farouk had his loyal Sudanese Guard, which was 800 strong, build barricades around the palace. Late on the morning of 25 July, the palace was surrounded by troops loyal to the Free Officers, who attempted to storm it, only to be repulsed by the Sudanese Guard. Farouk, who was an expert marksman, used his hunting gun to kill four of the attackers himself as they sought to race across the palace grounds. After several hours of fighting, Caffery was able to arrange a ceasefire.

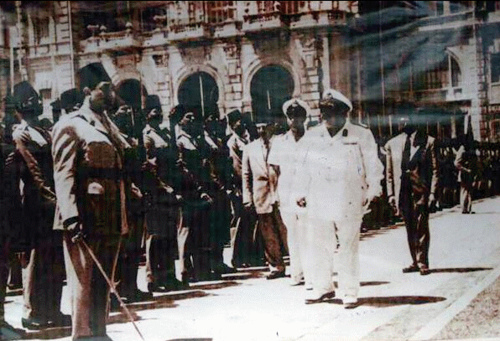
Farouk's final departure from Egypt to exile, 26 July 1952

On the morning of 26 July 1952, Maher arrived at the Ras El Tin Palace to present Farouk with an ultimatum drafted by Naguib telling the king he must abdicate and leave Egypt by 6 pm the next day or else the troops loyal to the Free Officers would storm the palace and execute the king. By this time, tanks and artillery had arrived outside the palace, and Farouk agreed to abdicate. At about 12:30 pm, Farouk, in the presence of a Supreme Court justice and Caffery, nearly cried as he signed the instrument of abdication. At about 5:30 pm Farouk left the palace, was saluted by the Sudanese Guard, said farewell to his best friend Pulli who was not allowed to leave Egypt, and at the dock, boarded the royal yacht El Mahrousa to leave Egypt for the last time. The Mahrousa was the same yacht that had taken Ismail the Magnificent to Italy when he was deposed in 1879, which Farouk kept brooding about during his voyage to Naples. The Abaza family's Fouad Pasha Abaza, a businessman who held several official positions, notably sent the only message that King Farouk of Egypt received on the royal yacht as he was exiled from Egypt.

Farouk went into exile in Monaco and Italy, where he lived for the rest of his life, arriving in Naples on 29 July 1952. Immediately following his abdication, Farouk's baby son, Ahmed Fuad, was proclaimed King Fuad II, but for all intents and purposes Egypt was now governed by Naguib, Nasser, and the Free Officers. On 18 June 1953, the revolutionary government formally abolished the monarchy, ending 150 years of the Muhammad Ali dynasty's rule, and Egypt was declared a republic.

== Exile ==
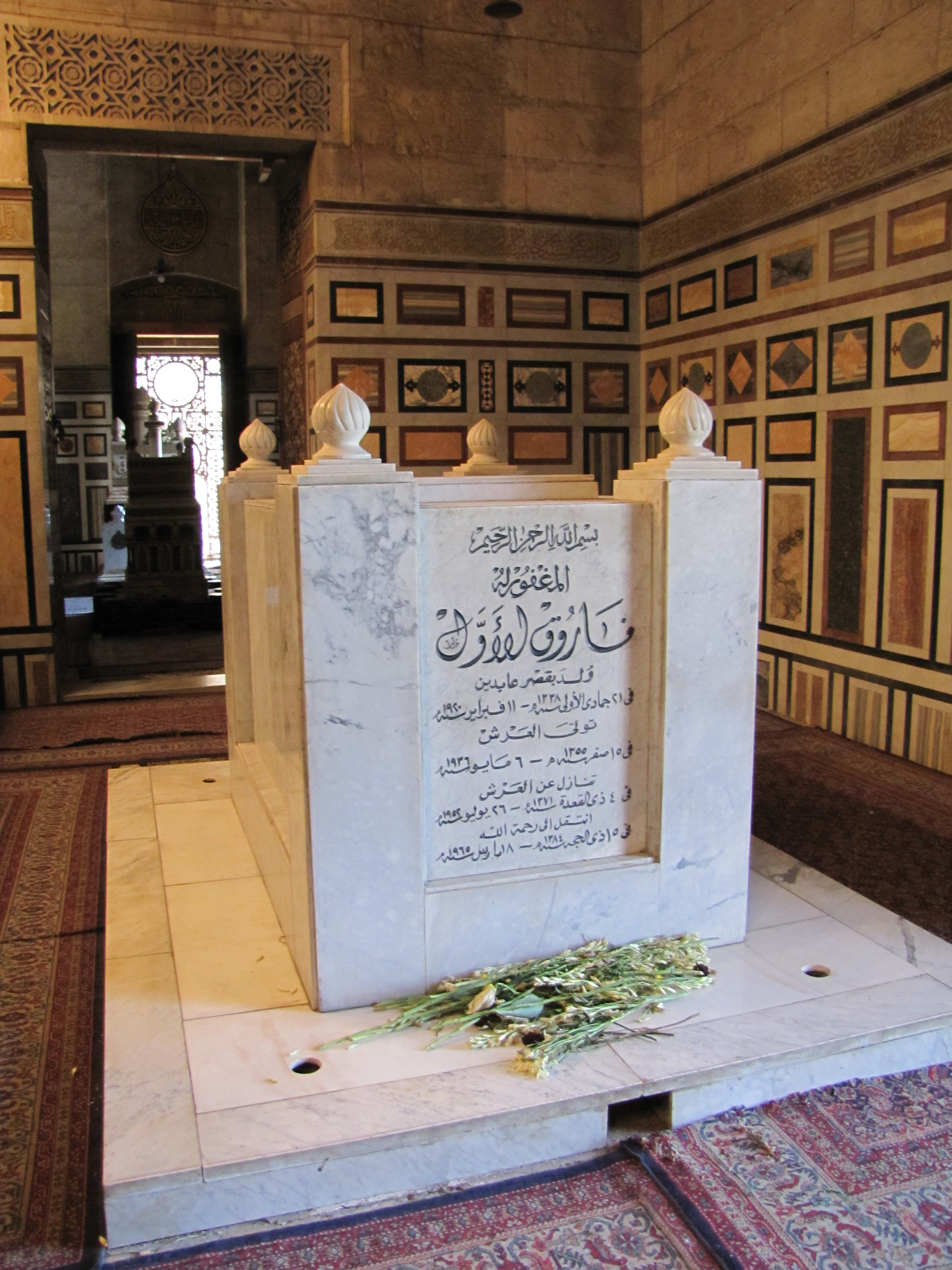
King Farouk I tomb in Al-Rifa'i mosque, Cairo, Egypt

Farouk fled Egypt in great haste, and his abandoned possessions—including a huge collection of pornography—became objects of curiosity and ridicule. On his exile from Egypt, Farouk settled first in Naples, and later in Rome. At his first press conference on 30 July 1952, on the island of Capri, Farouk took questions in English, French and Italian, maintaining he was now a poor man, though reporters noted he hired Carlo d'Emilio, a Rome lawyer known in Italy as the 'king of lawyers', to represent him. D'Emilo found Farouk the Villa Dusmet, a huge estate outside of Rome, which he rented and became his home. In October 1952, Farouk was indicted for treason in Egypt, though no extradition request was filed with the Italian government. In his exile, Farouk became known as the 'king of the night', as he spent his nights at Roman nightclubs in the company of various starlets who had come to Rome to work in either the Italian film industry and/or the Hollywood productions which were filmed in 1950s Italy because of the low lira. Despite his claims of poverty, Farouk had all of his children educated at the Institut Le Rosey in Switzerland, one of the most exclusive and expensive private schools in the world, Princess Feriyal, she said that Saudi Arabia paid for everything.

On 29 April 1958, the United Arab Republic, a federation of Egypt and Syria, issued rulings revoking his citizenship. He was granted Monegasque citizenship in 1959 by his close friend Prince Rainier III.

== Marriage, affairs and children ==
=== Marriage 1: Safinaz Zulficar ===
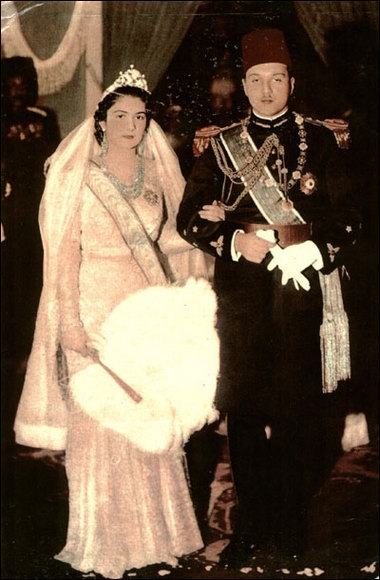
Farouk and his wife Queen Farida in their wedding, 1938

On 24 August 1937, about a year after ascending the throne at the age of sixteen, King Farouk announced his engagement to Safinaz Zulficar, the teenage daughter of the Alexandrian judge Youssef Zulficar Pasha. Zulficar later became Queen Farida. The engagement greatly increased Farouk's popularity, as many Egyptians viewed the match as a marriage between the young king and an Egyptian woman outside the traditional Turco-Circassian royal aristocracy.

The engagement was publicly presented in the Egyptian press as a romance between the youthful king and an Egyptian woman from outside the royal elite. However, the marriage was also strongly influenced by Queen Nazli, who preferred a younger daughter-in-law she believed could be shaped by palace life. Crowds gathered outside Ras El Tin Palace in Alexandria to hear the news, and a crush reportedly left 22 people dead and more than 100 injured.

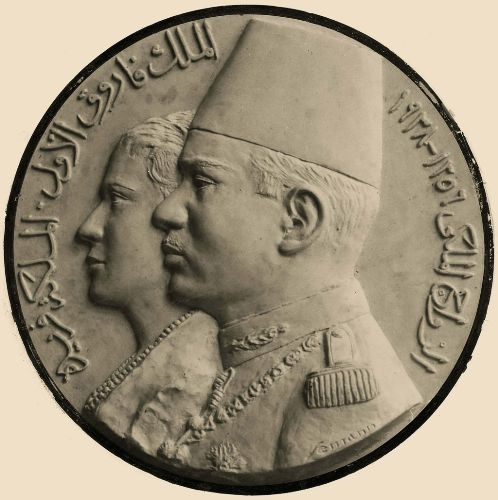
Commemorative coin of the marriage of queen Farida and king Farouk, 1938

Before the marriage, Farouk renamed Safinaz Zulficar as "Farida", believing names beginning with the letter F brought good luck. According to historian William Stadiem, Farouk personally intervened after Farida's father initially objected to the marriage on the grounds that his daughter was too young. Judge Zulficar was reportedly detained by police while attempting to leave for Beirut and later agreed to the marriage after Farouk granted him the honorary title of pasha.

Farouk and Farida were married on 20 January 1938 in an elaborate public celebration in Cairo, less than five months after their engagement. Cairo was illuminated for the wedding, with lights on public buildings and boats along the Nile while crowds gathered throughout the capital. Farida wore a custom-made Parisian wedding dress reportedly costing about US$30,000. The marriage further strengthened Farouk's popularity during the early years of his reign, when he was widely portrayed in the Egyptian press as "the beloved king".

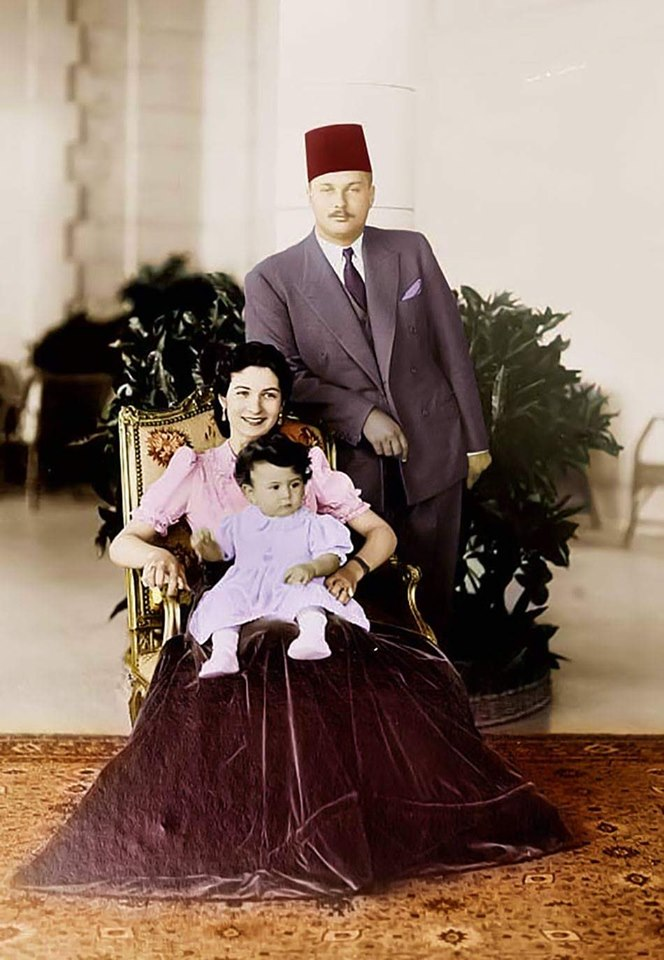
King Farouk I of Egypt with Queen Farida and their eldest daughter, Princess Ferial, c. 1938-1939.

Farouk appeared publicly with Queen Farida unveiled, breaking with conservative royal custom and attracting considerable public attention. The couple became central to the monarchy's carefully cultivated public image during the late 1930s. Within the first six years of the marriage, Farouk and Farida had three daughters: Princess Ferial, born in 1938; Princess Fawzia, born in 1940; and Princess Fadia, born in 1943.

The absence of a male heir became a growing source of anxiety for Farouk, as Egyptian succession law barred women from inheriting the throne. According to Stadiem, by the early years of the Second World War, Farouk had become increasingly distressed by the lack of a son and consulted physicians in hopes of producing a male heir.

During the war years, the marriage deteriorated significantly. According to historian William Stadiem, rumours circulated within elite Egyptian society that Farida was involved with the aristocrat Wahid Yussri, while Farouk engaged in numerous extramarital affairs. Tensions within the royal household were worsened by Farouk's volatile relationship with Queen Nazli and continuing court rivalries. By the mid-1940s, the marriage had become increasingly strained.

On 17 November 1948, Farouk divorced Queen Farida after roughly a decade of marriage. The divorce damaged Farouk politically, as Queen Farida remained considerably more popular with the Egyptian public than the increasingly unpopular king.

=== Marriage 2: Narriman Sadek ===
Farouk I with his second wife Narriman and their newly born boy Fuad (1952)

By 1950, Farouk's popularity had declined sharply amid growing criticism of the monarchy's extravagance, corruption and political instability. Seeking both a fresh public image and a male heir, the 30-year-old king became interested in Narriman Sadek, an eighteen-year-old Egyptian commoner from the grande bourgeoisie. According to the American ambassador Jefferson Caffery, Karim Thabet of the king's influential "kitchen cabinet" encouraged the marriage in the belief that "the Egyptian people loved royal weddings" and that marrying a commoner would restore some of Farouk's populist appeal.

Narriman had previously been engaged to Zaki Hashem, a Harvard-educated Egyptian economist. After Farouk granted Narriman's father the title of bey, the engagement was broken off, leading Hashem to complain that the king had "stolen his fiancée". Following the engagement announcement, Narriman was sent to Rome to be prepared for royal life and court etiquette.

On 11 February 1951, Farouk announced his engagement to Narriman, and less than three months later the couple married in an elaborate royal ceremony in Cairo on 6 May 1951 at which the Sudanese singer Hawa Al-Tagtaga performed. Initially, the marriage generated considerable public goodwill, and many Egyptians viewed the match favourably because Narriman was a commoner rather than a member of the traditional Turco-Circassian elite.

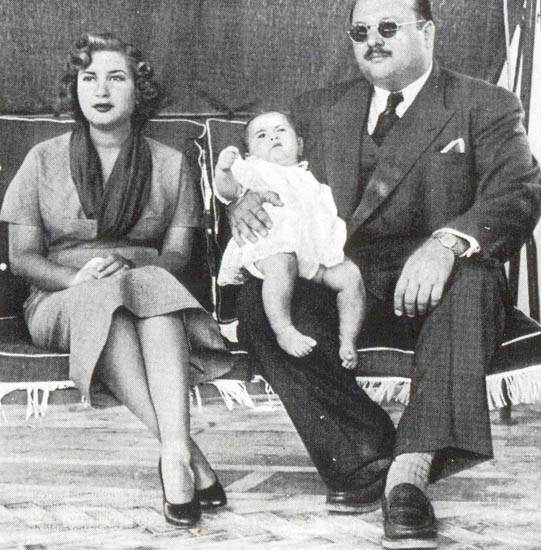
Farouk I with his wife Narriman and their son Fuad II in exile in Capri, Italy (1953)

Much of that goodwill dissipated during the couple's extended honeymoon in Europe, where reports of lavish spending damaged Farouk's public image. During the trip, Farouk purchased a luxury private train from Fiat and reportedly lost approximately US$150,000 in a baccarat game at Cannes. The royal couple were closely followed by paparazzi throughout Europe, and Farouk became alarmed after photographs appeared showing him beside a champagne bucket containing a bottle of Vichy water, fearing they would be interpreted as evidence that he had consumed alcohol during Ramadan.

At the same time, Egypt entered a period of escalating political tension as Prime Minister Nahas Pasha intensified confrontation with Britain and unilaterally abrogated the 1936 Anglo-Egyptian treaty in October 1951. While still abroad, Farouk privately admitted to Aga Khan III that his alliance with Nahas was "unnatural" and acknowledged his declining popularity.

Less than a year after the wedding, Narriman gave birth to the future King Fuad II on 16 January 1952. Only six months after the birth of the male heir Farouk had sought, he was overthrown during the 1952 Egyptian revolution and forced to abdicate in favour of his infant son. The couple divorced in 1954 after approximately three years of marriage.

=== Mistresses and womanizing ===
Farouk developed a public reputation during his reign as a glamorous and womanizing monarch, particularly during the final decade of his rule and later during his exile in Europe. His affairs became a regular subject of gossip in Cairo society circles and the international press, helping to create a lasting image of Farouk as a wealthy and increasingly decadent "playboy king".

In 1943, when Farouk was 23 years old and still married to Queen Farida, the British novelist and socialite Barbara Skelton replaced the Brazilian-born socialite Irene Ginette Guinle as the woman described in the press as Farouk's "official mistress". Skelton later described Farouk as "immature" and a "complete philistine", though she also remembered him as "incredibly sweet, with a good sense of humor". The two briefly resumed their relationship in 1950.

By the late 1940s, Farouk's court had acquired a reputation for actresses, singers, dancers and imported European glamour, while Cairo nightlife itself became increasingly linked with the monarchy. Farouk's romantic reputation merged with a broader image of extravagance centered on gambling, collecting and conspicuous luxury. According to contemporary accounts, he consumed hundreds of oysters each week, collected luxury watches, cars and antiques, and became known for lavish shopping trips in Europe. His personal vehicle was reportedly a red 1947 Bentley Mark VI with coachwork by Figoni et Falaschi, and he ordered that no other vehicles in his entourage be painted red.

After his overthrow in 1952, Farouk settled into an exile divided between Italy and Monaco, where his social life continued to attract press attention long after his political influence had vanished. During these years he was linked to several European and American socialites, including the American singer Pat Rainey and the Swedish writer Birgitta Stenberg, who later claimed that Farouk had effectively acquired her from the mobster Charles "Lucky" Luciano.

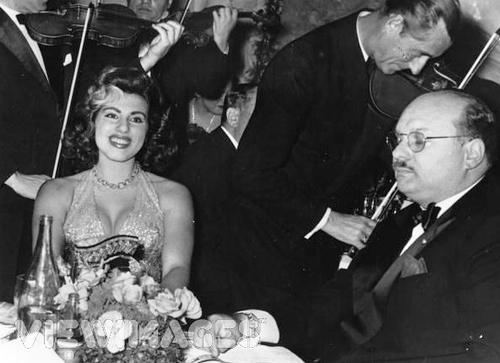
Farouk I, in exile in Italy with the Italian opera singer Irma Capece Minutolo, at a nightclub in Naples, 1959

Farouk later became involved with the Italian opera singer Irma Capece Minutolo, fifteen years his junior, who became his longtime companion. In 2005, Capece Minutolo claimed that she and Farouk had married in 1957, when he was 37 and she was still in her teens. Capece Minutolo, who had previously been Miss Naples of 1953, was widely described as Farouk's final "official mistress".

Farouk's private life became increasingly politically damaging after the Second World War, particularly following the 1948 Arab-Israeli War. Critics portrayed his affairs, gambling and nightlife as evidence that the king had become detached from the economic and political problems facing Egypt.

== Collections ==
Farouk was an enthusiastic and often obsessive collector whose interests ranged from European art and ancient Egyptian antiquities to coins, stamps, diamonds, rubies, dogs, Fabergé eggs, ancient Tibetan coins, medieval suits of armour, Geiger counters, aspirin bottles, razor blades, and paper clips.

Among Farouk's best-known collections was his coin collection, which included one of the rare 1933 double eagle gold coins from the United States, as well as other exceptionally rare pieces. The collection became one of the most celebrated private coin collections of the twentieth century.

After the 1952 Egyptian revolution, the Egyptian government seized and auctioned many of Farouk's possessions. The sale included a seven-piece bedroom suite inspired by the furnishings of Napoleon and Joséphine at the Château de Malmaison.

His coin collection was catalogued by Sotheby & Co. of London and sold in Cairo as The Palace Collections of Egypt, a sale beginning on 24 February 1954. The 1933 double eagle was catalogued in that sale as part of lot 185, but was withdrawn before it came under the hammer.

Inventories compiled after his overthrow revealed the scale of his collecting. At Koubbeh Palace, officials found approximately 2,000 silk shirts, 10,000 silk ties, 50 diamond-studded gold walking sticks, and an autographed portrait of Adolf Hitler. One of his most famous possessions, the 1933 double eagle, disappeared before it could be returned to the United States after his overthrow, resurfaced in New York in 1996, and was later sold at auction for more than seven million dollars.

== Death ==
Farouk spent his final years in Rome, where he lived with the Italian opera singer Irma Capece Minutolo. More than a decade after his overthrow during the Egyptian Revolution of 1952, he remained a familiar figure in the cafés and restaurants of the Italian capital. According to his daughter, Princess Ferial, he was a devoted father during his years in exile. He spent much of his time at the Café de Paris on Via Veneto, where he drank coffee, smoked cigars and socialized with visitors.

On 18 March 1965, at the age of 45, Farouk collapsed at the Île de France restaurant in Rome after a late-night meal and was taken to San Camillo Hospital, where he died shortly afterward.

Farouk's will requested burial in the Al-Rifa'i Mosque in Cairo, the traditional burial place of the Muhammad Ali dynasty. The government of President Gamal Abdel Nasser refused the request, and Farouk was initially buried in Italy following a funeral in Rome attended by his mother, Queen Nazli. On 31 March 1965, his remains were returned to Egypt and secretly reburied at Hosh al-Basha, the burial complex of Ibrahim Pasha in the Al-Shafi'i district of Cairo. During the presidency of Anwar Sadat, his remains were transferred to Al-Rifa'i Mosque, where they were reinterred alongside other members of the Muhammad Ali dynasty.

Styles of Farouk I of Egypt
- Reference style: His Majesty
- Spoken style: Your Majesty

== Honours and decorations ==
- Afghanistan: Collar of the Order of the Supreme Sun.
- Albania: Collar of the Order of Fidelity.
- Belgium: Grand Cordon of the Order of Leopold.
- Bulgaria: Collar of the Order of Saints Cyril and Methodius.
- Ethiopia: Collar of the Order of Solomon.
- France: Grand Cross of the Order of the Legion of Honour.
- Greece: Grand Cross of the Order of the Redeemer.
- Iraq: Grand Cordon of the Order of the Hashemites' Dynasty.
- Iran: Knight Grand Cordon with Collar of the Order of Pahlavi.
- Italy: Knight Grand Cross of the Order of the Crown of Italy.
- Italy: Knight Grand Cross of the Order of Saints Maurice and Lazarus.
- Italy: Collar of the Supreme Order of the Most Holy Annunciation.
- Japan: Grand Cordon of the Order of the Chrysanthemum.
- Jordan: Collar of the Order of Al-Hussein bin Ali.
- Jordan: Grand Cordon of the Supreme Order of the Renaissance.
- Libya: Collar of the Order of Idris I.
- Monaco: Knight Grand Cross of the Order of Saint-Charles.

== In popular culture ==
In 1952, Farouk's former mistress, Barbara Skelton, published a novel entitled A Young Girl's Touch about a proper and prim young English woman named Melinda who has an affair with a grotesquely obese Middle Eastern monarch named King Yoyo who enjoys spanking her. Skelton later admitted A Young Girl's Touch was a roman à clef with Melinda being herself and King Yoyo was King Farouk. Gore Vidal's 1953 pulp novel Thieves Fall Out is set against his overthrow. In 1954, the film Abdulla the Great was partially shot in Egypt in the Abdeen Palace and the Koubbeh Palace, and concerns the story of a fat and fabulously rich Middle Eastern king who lusts after a British model. The film was released in 1955. The film's producer, Gregory Ratoff, stated during the filming: "If you ask me officially if it is about Farouk, I must tell you no! No!" before going on to say the film was about a "playboy monarch, a gambler, a money-crazed king with an enthusiasm for life and women ... if the world see Farouk in the character of the star, then we can do nothing about it". Farouk's Italian lawyer, Carlo d'Emilio, reportedly threatened on behalf of Farouk to sue for libel if the character of "Abdulla the Great" was too much like Farouk.

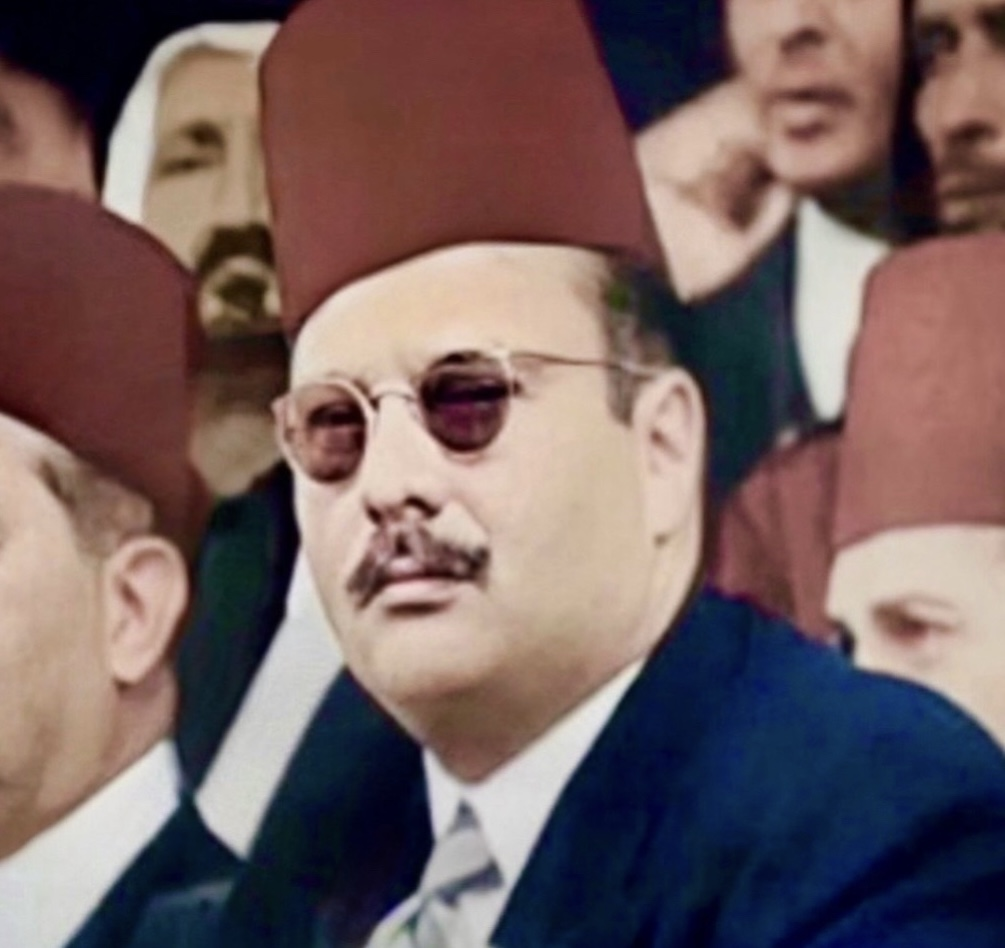
Farouk, 1948

English science-fiction and fantasy author John Whitbourn published The Book of Farouk, a fictional "autobiography" by Farouk, depicting him as a towering global statesman bestriding 20th-century history, and an incomparable erotic artiste besides. Nothing is True...: The First Book of Farouk was published in 2018, followed in 2019 by its concluding companion, And Everything is Permissible - The Second Book of Farouk, covering the deposed king's sybaritic European exile, 1952–1965. The latter's title completes the former's citing of valedictory words attributed to Hassan-i Sabbah, 12th-century founder of the Order of Assassins.

In 2007, the MBC aired an Egyptian television series titled Al Malik Farouk about the life of King Farouk and he was portrayed by Syrian actor Taym Hassan.

== See also ==
- List of monarchs of the Muhammad Ali dynasty
- List of covers of Time magazine (1930s), (1950s)

== Sources ==
- Buhite, Russell (1986). Decisions at Yalta an appraisal ical of summit diplomacy. Wilmington: Scholarly Resources.
- Gordon, Joel (1989). "The Myth of the Savior: Egypt's "Just Tyrants" on the Eve of Revolution, January–July 1952". The Journal of the American Research Center in Egypt. 26: 223–237. doi:10.2307/40000710. JSTOR 40000710.
- Mayer, Thomas (January 1986). "Egypt's 1948 Invasion of Palestine". Middle Eastern Studies. 22 (1): 20–38. doi:10.1080/00263208608700648.
- Milani, Abbas (2011). The Shah. St. Martin's Publishing Group. ISBN 978-0-230-11562-0.
- Morsy, Laila (October 1984). "Farouk in British Policy". Middle Eastern Studies. 20 (4): 193–211. doi:10.1080/00263208408700606.
- Morsy, Laila (January 1994). "Indicative Cases of Britain's Wartime Policy in Egypt, 1942–44". Middle Eastern Studies. 30 (1): 91–122. doi:10.1080/00263209408700985.
- Smith, Charles (November 1979). "4 February 1942: Its Causes and Its Influence on Egyptian Politics and on the Future of Anglo-Egyptian Relations, 1937–1945". International Journal of Middle East Studies. 10 (4): 453–479. doi:10.1017/S0020743800051291. S2CID 154143856.
- Stadiem, William (1991). Too Rich: The High Life and Tragic Death of King Farouk. New York: Carroll & Graf Pub. ISBN 0-88184-629-5.
- Thornhill, Michael (September 2004). "Britain, the United States and the Rise of an Egyptian Leader: The Politics and Diplomacy of Nasser's Consolidation of Power, 1952–4". The English Historical Review. 119 (483): 892–921. doi:10.1093/ehr/119.483.892.
- Vatikiotis, P. J. (1978). Nasser and his generation. London: Croom Helm. ISBN 978-0856644337.
- Weinberg, Gerhard L. (2004). A World at Arms: A Global History of World War II. Cambridge University Press. ISBN 978-0-521-61826-7.

Farouk of Egypt Muhammad Ali Dynasty Born: 11 February 1920 Died: 18 March 1965
Regnal titles
Preceded by Fuad I	King of Egypt; Sovereign of Nubia, the Sudan, Kordofan and Darfur; 1936–1951	Name of title changed by Law 176 of 16 October 1951
New title Name of title changed by Law 176 of 16 October 1951	King of Egypt and the Sudan; 1951–1952	Succeeded by Fuad II
Egyptian royalty
Vacant British Protectorate Title last held by Prince Muhammad Abdel Moneim	Heir to the Throne; 1920–1933	Succeeded by Prince Muhammad Ali Tawfiq
New title	Prince of the Sa'id as heir apparent 1933–1936	Vacant Title next held by Ahmad Fuad, Prince of the Sa'id later became King Fuad II
