= Irma Capece Minutolo =

Italian opera singer (1935–2023)

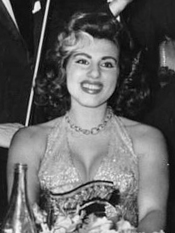
- Minutolo in the 1959
- Born: 6 August 1935; Naples, Italy
- Died: 7 June 2023 (aged 87)
- Occupation: Opera singer

Irma Capece Minutolo (6 August 1935 – 7 June 2023) was an Italian opera singer who was one of the last companions of King Farouk of Egypt. In later years, she claimed she was the king's last wife and used the name Irma Capece Minutolo Farouk.

== Background ==
Irma Capece Minutolo was born in Naples, Italy on 6 August 1935, reportedly a daughter of Augusto Capece Minutolo.

In 1954, Time reported that Capece Minutolo's "right to be called a marchioness was recently disputed when two Italian newsmen declared that her parents were a chauffeur and a janitor's daughter." A trial for slander resulted, though its outcome is unknown.

== Career ==
Capece Minutolo developed a successful opera career after the death of Farouk.

In addition to her opera career, she appeared in several motion pictures:

- Napoletani a Milano (1953)
- Siamo Ricchi e Poveri (1954)
- Young Toscanini (1988, role: Signora Martelli), a Franco Zeffirelli film starring Elizabeth Taylor and C. Thomas Howell
- Crazy Underwear (1992)
- Boom (1992)

== Declaration of marriage to King Farouk ==
In 2005, in an interview with Al-Ahram Weekly, Capece Minutolo said that she married Farouk "in the Islamic tradition" when she was 16 and that she was writing a memoir of her life as the king's wife.

Published sources such as Time magazine indicate that Capece Minutolo was born in 1935, which would place her supposed marriage at the age of 16 in 1951. That is the same year that the king married his second wife Narriman Sadek.

Capece Minutolo also stated that she and Farouk had been married, at the time of his death in 1965, for a total of eight years, which would mean that the purported ceremony took place in 1957. However, in 1954, Time in describing Capece Minutolo as "his current traveling companion, a voluptuous Neapolitan", stated that the singer had declined to marry the deposed monarch, claiming, "Farouk is sensible and tender, but marriage is the tomb of love." Six years later, the couple's legal status had not changed, since Time described the singer as the former king's "one conspicuous indulgence: buxom, blonde Irma Capece Minuto [sic], his on-again-off-again sweetheart, whom Farouk may marry sometime." However, in Farouk's death notice, published in The New York Times, Capece Minutolo was identified as "Farouk's constant companion in recent years."

Capece Minutolo further stated that she was 24 when Farouk died, in 1965, which would place her birth year as 1941. In February 1954, however, the same month that King Farouk and Queen Narriman divorced, Time referred to the singer as the King's "latest collector's item" and gave her age as 18, which would place her birth in 1935, given her birthday (6 August).

Capece Minutolo's claim of having married the exiled Egyptian monarch has not been substantiated.

== Death ==
Irma Capece Minutolo died on 7 June 2023, at the age of 87.
