= Crazy Underwear =

1992 comedy film

- Directed by: Roberto D'Agostino
- Written by: Roberto D'Agostino; Fiorenzo Senese
- Produced by: Mario Cecchi Gori; Vittorio Cecchi Gori
- Starring: Monica Guerritore; Eva Grimaldi
- Cinematography: Alfio Contini
- Edited by: Antonio Siciliano
- Music by: Gianni Mazza
- Release date: 1992
- Country: Italy
- Language: Italian

Crazy Underwear (Italian: Mutande pazze) is a 1992 satirical comedy film co-written and directed by Roberto D'Agostino, in his directorial debut.

== Cast ==
- Monica Guerritore as Amalia
- Eva Grimaldi as Stefania
- Barbara Kero as Beatrice
- Deborah Calì as Alessia
- Marisa Merlini as Alessia's aunt
- Sergio Vastano as TV presenter
- Venantino Venantini as Alessia's father
- Irma Capece Minutolo as Alessia's mother
- Luigi Petrucci as Rolli
- Delia D'Alberti as Adriana
- Aldo Ralli as Nando Crass
- Giovanni Visentin as Sgorbi
- Aldo Busi as Himself
- Raoul Bova as Rocco
- Bruno Corazzari as TV editor
- Silvana Bosi as Stefania's mother

== Production ==
The film was shot in Cinecittà.

== Reception ==
A satire about Italian showbiz, the film was generally badly received by critics; in her review for La Stampa, Lietta Tornabuoni criticized the director's inability of distancing from its subject, up to the point that "the thick vulgarity of his chosen subject turns into truculent cinematic vulgarity". Il Secolo XIX film critic Aldo Viganò described the film as "Some stuff that has been seen and known before, staged quite sloppily", with D'Agostino "more concerned with sneering at everyone [...] and pronouncing moral judgments [...] rather than bothering to ensure a glimmer of human consistency for his characters".

Domestically, the film grossed over 700 million lire.
