= Kingdom of Albania =

Kingdom of Albania may refer to:

- Kingdom of Albania (medieval)
- Albanian Kingdom (1928–1939)
- Kingdom of Albania in personal union with Italy (1939–1943)
- Albanian Kingdom (1943–1944)
