= Fawkia of Egypt =

Fawkia فوقية
- Princess of Egypt; Countess of Adix-Dellmensingen
- Born: 6 October 1897; Saffron Palace, Cairo, Egypt
- Died: 9 February 1974 (aged 76); Zürich, Switzerland
- Burial: Al-Rifa'i Mosque, Cairo, Egypt
- Spouse: Mahmoud Fakhry Pasha (m. 1919, divorced) Wladimir of Adix-Dellmensingen (m. 1938; died 1973)
- Issue: Ahmad Fakhry Bey
- House: Muhammad Ali Dynasty
- Father: Fuad I
- Mother: Shivakiar Ibrahim

Fawkia of Egypt (Arabic: فوقية; 6 October 1897 – 9 February 1974) was an Egyptian princess who became Countess of Adix-Dellmensingen through her marriage to Count Wladimir of Adix-Dellmensingen.

== Early life ==
Princess Fawkia was born on 6 October 1897 at the Saffron Palace in Cairo, Egypt. She was the only daughter of prince Ahmed Fuad and princess Shivakiar. Her elder brother had died in July that year. Her parents divorced in 1898 and Fawkia was left in the care of her father. She had five half-siblings on her father's side and six half-siblings on her mother's side. She acquired the title of Her Sultanic Highness on 11 October 1917. When her father became king of Egypt in 1922, Fawkia became a royal princess with the style of Her Royal Highness.

== Marriage ==
Fawkia married the Egyptian diplomat Mahmoud Fakhry Pasha at the Bustan Palace in Cairo on 13 May 1919. The couple settled in a Rococo palace in Dokki. They had one child, Ahmed Fakhry Bey, who married Gloria Guinness. After her husband was appointed as the Egyptian ambassador of France, They moved to Paris.

In the French capital, she met Count Wladimir of Adix-Dellmensingen, a captain in the Russian Imperial Army infantry. After her divorce, she married Wladimir in 1938 in Paris. The Count converted to Islam, taking the name Farouk bin Abdullah.

== Later life ==
After the Egyptian Revolution, Fawkia settled permanently in Switzerland, where she lived practically secluded in the Dolder Hotel. Her last public appearance was at the funeral of King Farouk in 1965, in Rome.

She died at the Dolder Hotel on 8 February 1974 at the age of 76. Her second husband had died the previous year.

== Legacy ==
Princess Fawkia Secondary School, named in her honor, was built in Cairo in 1931. It was later renamed to Orman Secondary School for Girls. The Ophthalmology Hospital, which was established by the Health Authority in Rawd al-Farag, in Cairo, was named after Fawkia.

== Honours ==
- Egypt: Decoration of al-Kamal in brilliants (30 February 1930)

== See also ==
- Nazli Sabri
- Ferial Qadin
