= Mahmoud Fakhry Pasha =

Egyptian diplomat and politician (1885–1955)

Minister of Foreign Affairs
- In office December 1922 – February 1923
- Monarch: King Fouad
- Prime Minister: Tewfik Nessim

Minister of Finance
- In office May 1920 – March 1921
- Monarch: King Fouad
- Prime Minister: Tewfik Nessim

Personal details
- Born: 24 November 1884 Cairo, Kingdom of Egypt
- Died: 1 June 1955 (aged 70) Cairo, Republic of Egypt
- Resting place: Mausoleum of Imam al-Shafi'i, Cairo
- Spouse(s): Princess Badiha Hanim (m. 1913) Princess Fawkia Hanim (m. 1919)
- Children: 11
- Parent: Hussein Fakhry Pasha (father)

Mahmoud Fakhry Pasha (1884–1955) was an Egyptian politician and diplomat. He held several cabinet and high-ranking diplomacy posts. He was related to the royal family of Egypt who married first the daughter of Sultan Hussein Kamil and then the daughter of King Fuad.

== Early life and education ==
Fakhry was born in Cairo on 24 November 1884 into a Circassian-origin family. His parents were Hussein Fakhry Pasha, one of the prime ministers of Egypt, and Nashat Khanum, daughter of Abdullah Safvat.

Fakhry Pasha was a graduate of Collège des Jésuites in Cairo.

== Career ==
Fakhry was the grand chamberlain to Sultan Hussein Kamil (1916–1917) and King Fuad (1917–1919). He served as the sub-governor and then governor of Cairo (1919–1920). He was appointed minister of finance to the cabinet led by Tewfik Nessim and was in the office in the period May 1920–March 1921. Next he was named as the minister of foreign affairs in the second cabinet of Nessim and served in the post between December 1922 and February 1923. On 11 December 1922 Fakhry was awarded with the title of Pasha.

Fakhry was part of the three-member regency council established by King Fouad in 1922 which was given the task of ruling the country until Crown Prince Farouk became eligible to rule. The other members of the council included Adly Yakan Pasha and Tewfik Nessim. However, following the death of King Fouad in 1936 the parliament changed the council members.

Fakhry was appointed ambassador to France in December 1924 which he held until February 1942. Then he was appointed ambassador to Spain and later to Portugal, holding the two posts together. He also served as the ambassador to Belgium and Switzerland. He was the Egyptian delegate to the League of Nations and acted as the vice-president of the Assembly in 1939. In May 1945 he was again named as the ambassador to France, but his term ended in December 1945 when he retired due to the age limit. Following his return to Egypt he served as the director of the Suez Canal Company.

== Personal life and death ==
Fakhry married twice. His first wife was Princess Badiha Hanim, youngest daughter of Hussein Kamil, Sultan of Egypt. They married on 6 September 1913, and she died two months later on 6 November. Following her death Fakhry married Princess Fawkia Hanim, daughter of King Fuad and Shivakiar Ibrahim, on 13 May 1919. They lived in a palace on the shores of the Nile which was sold by the princess to her half-sister Princess Faika in June 1952.

Fakhry died in Cairo on 1 June 1955 and was buried at Imam Al Shafii mausoleum. Princess Fawkia died at a Zurich hotel, Grand Hotel Dolder, in 1974.

=== Awards ===
Fakhry was the recipient of the following: Grand Cordon of Order of the Nile, Title of Al Imtiaz (1922), Grand Cordon of Order of Ismail (1927), Order of the British Empire and Legion of Honour of France.
