= Class 220 =

Class 220 may refer to:

- British Rail Class 220, a class of Voyager diesel-electric high-speed multiple unit passenger trains
- DB Class V 200, or Class 220, a class of diesel-hydraulic express locomotives of the German Deutsche Bundesbahn
