= HSH =

HSH may refer to:

- Hekurudha Shqiptare, Albania's state-owned railway operator
- Henderson Executive Airport in Nevada, United States
- Hypomagnesemia with secondary hypocalcemia
- His or Her Serene Highness
- His Sultanic Highness
- H-S-H, an electric guitar pickup configuration
- Hudson Street Hooligans, a supporters group for Columbus Crew SC
- Hongkong and Shanghai Hotels, a holding company
- HSH Nordbank, a commercial bank in northern Europe
- Hochschule Hannover, a university in Germany
- Homebush railway station, in Sydney, Australia
- Hungarian Sign Language
- Hydrogenated starch hydrosylate, an artificial sugar substitute
- PLDT High Speed Hitters, abbreviated as HSH
