= Waldhaus Dolder =

Former hotel in Zurich, Switzerland

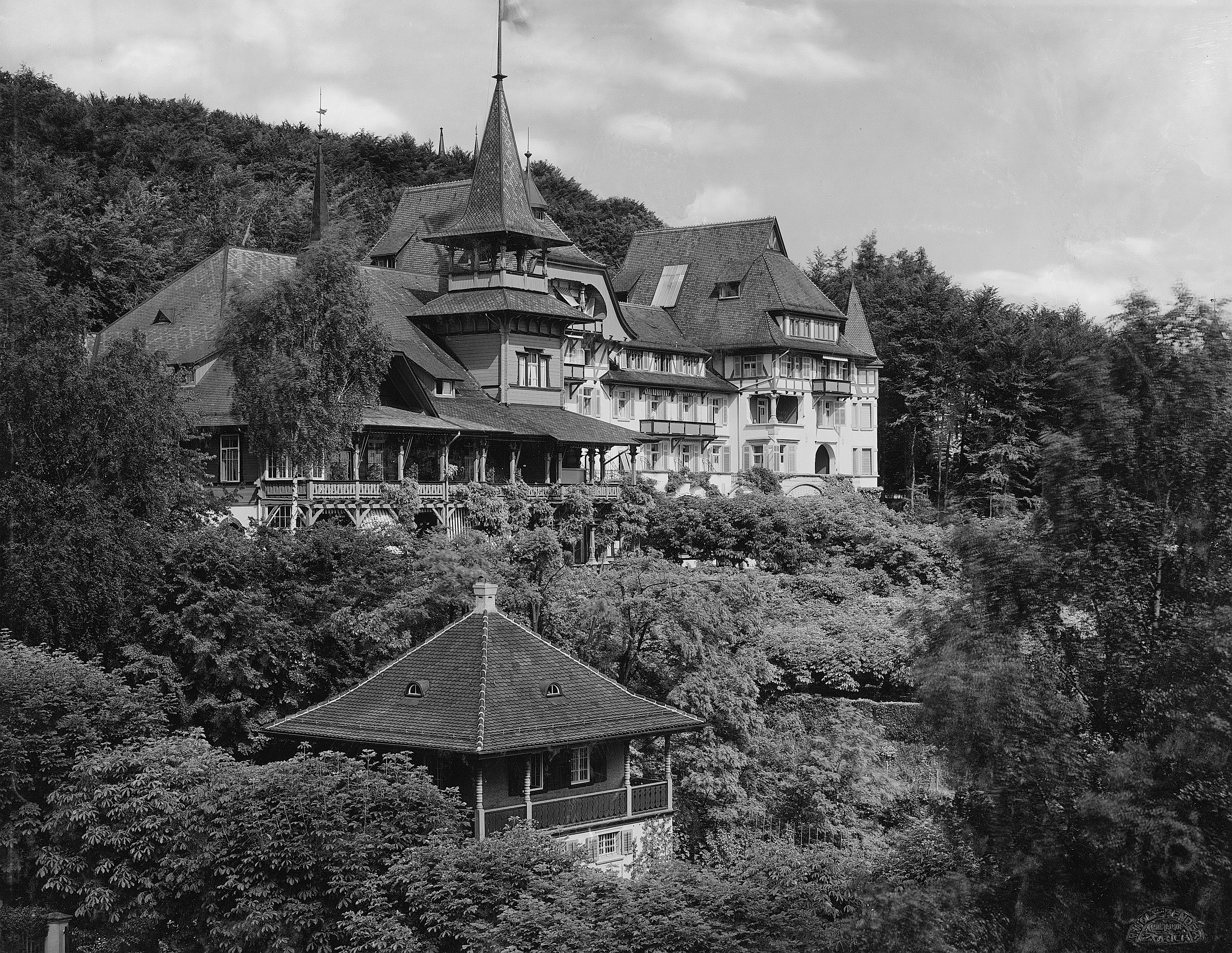
- Front view of the initial building
- Interactive map of the Waldhaus Dolder area

General information
- Architectural style: Heimatstil
- Location: Zurich–Switzerland, Kurhausstrasse 20
- Coordinates: 47.3727°N 8.5688°E
- Opening: July 1895
- Closed: 1972
- Owner: Heinrich Hürlimann

Design and construction
- Architect: Jacques Gros

The Waldhaus Dolder is a former hotel located on the Zürichberg hillside near the Dolder Grand Hotel in Zürich, Switzerland. It was originally conceived in 1879 by Heinrich Hürlimann (1841–1910), who had previously commissioned the Schauspielhaus Zürich.

In 1890, Hürlimann began acquiring plots of land on the Zürichberg hillside, with plans to develop a complex that would include a wildlife park, a restaurant, a hotel, and a cable car. In 1894, the Federal Council granted a provisional concession for a cable railway from the Römerhof square to the Dolder. A public company was established, and the engineer Ulrich Bosshard was contracted to construct the Dolderbahn.

The architect Jacques Gros designed the Waldhaus Dolder, which served as both a restaurant and a mountain station for the Dolderbahn. Construction occurred between 1894 and 1895. The Waldhaus Dolder underwent various renovations and expansions between 1899 and 1930.

== Demolition and new construction ==
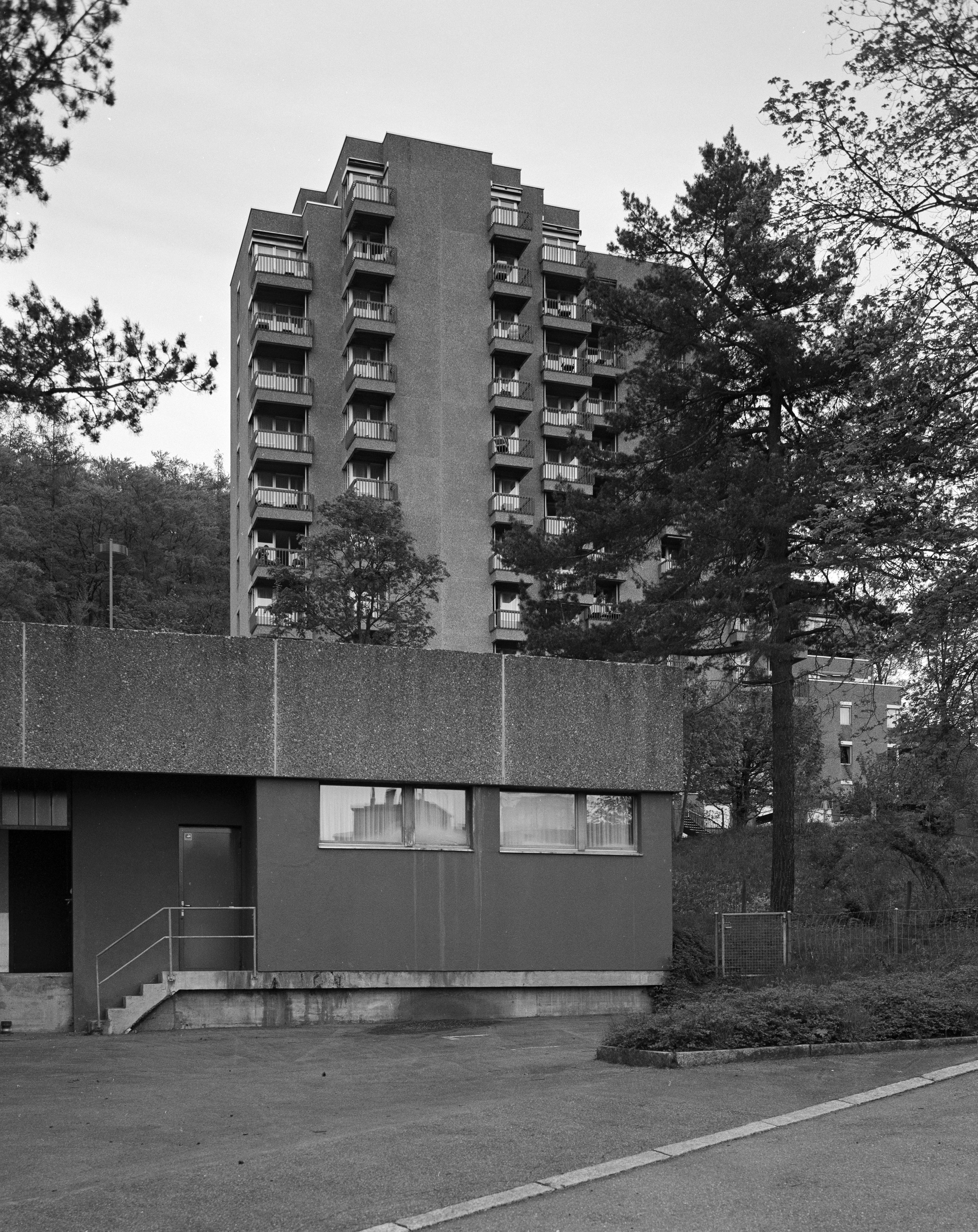
Current structure

The Waldhaus Dolder was demolished in 1972 and replaced by a new hotel building completed in 1974, designed by architects Robert Briner and Herbert Wirth in the style of the 1970s. The current structure, featuring three concrete towers, is a notable feature of the Adlisberg area. However, local reports indicate that some residents have found it difficult to "warm to" the architecture, particularly the brown color of the towers.

In 2011, it was announced that the hotel would be demolished and replaced with a new structure designed by architect Meili Peter.

In 2017, Dolder Hotel AG announced plans for a redevelopment of the Waldhaus Dolder. These plans were postponed due to a decline in demand for hotel rooms and a legal dispute involving the owner, Urs E. Schwarzenbach.

In 2024, Dolder Hotel AG announced a revised development plan, focusing on converting the existing towers into residential apartments, including 83 studios and apartments of various sizes. The surrounding area is set to be redeveloped with low-rise buildings featuring a restaurant, a panoramic terrace, and a co-working space. The total cost of this redevelopment is projected at 62 million Swiss francs.
