= Dolderbahn =

Swiss rack railway

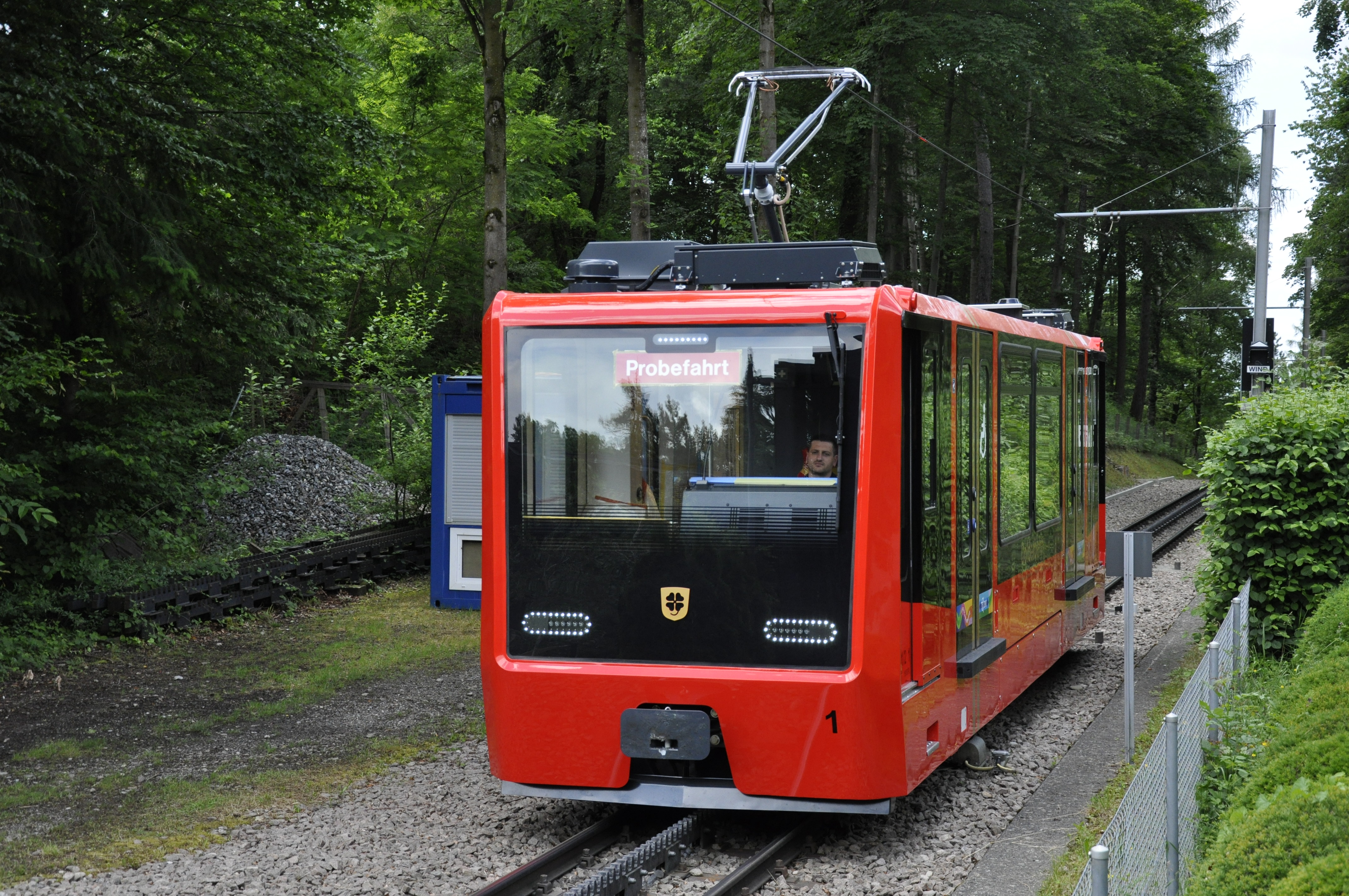
- Dolderbahn railcar Bhe 1/2 1 (Stadler) on a test drive

Overview
- Status: In operation
- Owner: Dolderbahn-Betriebs AG (since 1973); Dolderbahn-Aktiengesellschaft
- Locale: Zürich, Switzerland
- Coordinates: 47°22′20″N 8°34′01″E
- Termini: Römerhof (47.3685°N 8.5610°E); Dolder (47.3732°N 8.5746°E)
- Stations: 4 (including Titlisstrasse, Waldhaus)
- Website: stadt-zuerich.ch

Service
- Route number: 732
- Operator(s): Verkehrsbetriebe Zürich

History
- Opened: 1895 (as funicular); 1973 (as rack railway)

Technical
- Number of tracks: 1 with passing loop
- Rack system: von Roll
- Track gauge: 1,000 mm (3 ft 3 3/8 in) metre gauge
- Electrification: 600 V, DC, overhead line
- Highest elevation: 606 m (1,988 ft)
- Maximum incline: 19.6%

The Dolderbahn (Db or DBZ) is a 1.3-kilometre (0.81 mi) long rack railway in the Swiss city of Zürich. The line is in Zürich's Hottingen and Fluntern quarters on the south slope of the Adlisberg mountain. The lower terminus of the line is at Römerhof, some 1.5 km (0.93 mi) from the city centre, where it connects with lines 2 and 3 of the Zürich tramway. The upper terminus at Bergstation Dolderbahn is adjacent to the Dolder Grand Hotel and the Dolder recreation area. Two intermediate stations, at Titlisstrasse and Waldhaus Dolder, are also served. Although there are several rack railways in Switzerland, it is one of the few in the world within a city (others include the Principe–Granarolo rack railway and Stuttgart Rack Railway).

The line is owned by the Dolderbahn-Betriebs AG, which is itself 50% owned by the city of Zürich, and is operated on their behalf by the municipal transport operator Verkehrsbetriebe Zürich. The line was opened in 1895 as a funicular railway, and converted to rack operation in 1973. Because of this history, it is still sometimes erroneously referred to as a funicular or cable car.

== History ==
The first proposal for the line was in 1890, when Heinrich Hürlimann purchased land in the area, although his first proposals fell through. In 1893, the Dolderbahn-Aktiengesellschaft company was formed to build the line, with construction commencing the following year. The line was built as a funicular railway and opened in 1895. The upper terminus of the funicular was roughly on the site of the uppermost of the current line's two intermediate stations. The funicular had a length of 816 metres (2,677 ft) and overcame a height difference of 100 metres (328 ft) with a maximum gradient of 18%.

Following the opening of the line, a restaurant was built at the line's upper terminus; this became the Dolder Waldhaus Hotel in 1906. In 1899, the Dolder Grand Hotel was built uphill from the upper terminus of the funicular, and was linked to the funicular by a short electric tramway, with a single tramcar. The line was built to the same 1,000 mm (3 ft 3 3/8 in) gauge as Zürich's other electric tramways, but was never connected to any of them. In 1922 the tramcar was rebuilt to allow one-man operation, but in 1930 it was replaced by a bus.

In 1971 the concession of the original company expired, and a new company, the Dolderbahn-Betriebs-AG, was created to convert the line to rack operation. At the same time the line was extended at its upper end to directly serve the Dolder Grand Hotel, thus replacing the bus that had in turn replaced the tram. The new line opened in 1973, and in 1999 the Verkehrsbetriebe Zürich took over operation of the line. In 2004, the line was completely renovated along with the four stations and two railcars. As part of this rebuild, a new design of flexible rack turnout was installed at the passing point.

== Rolling stock ==
=== 1973 SLM rolling stock ===
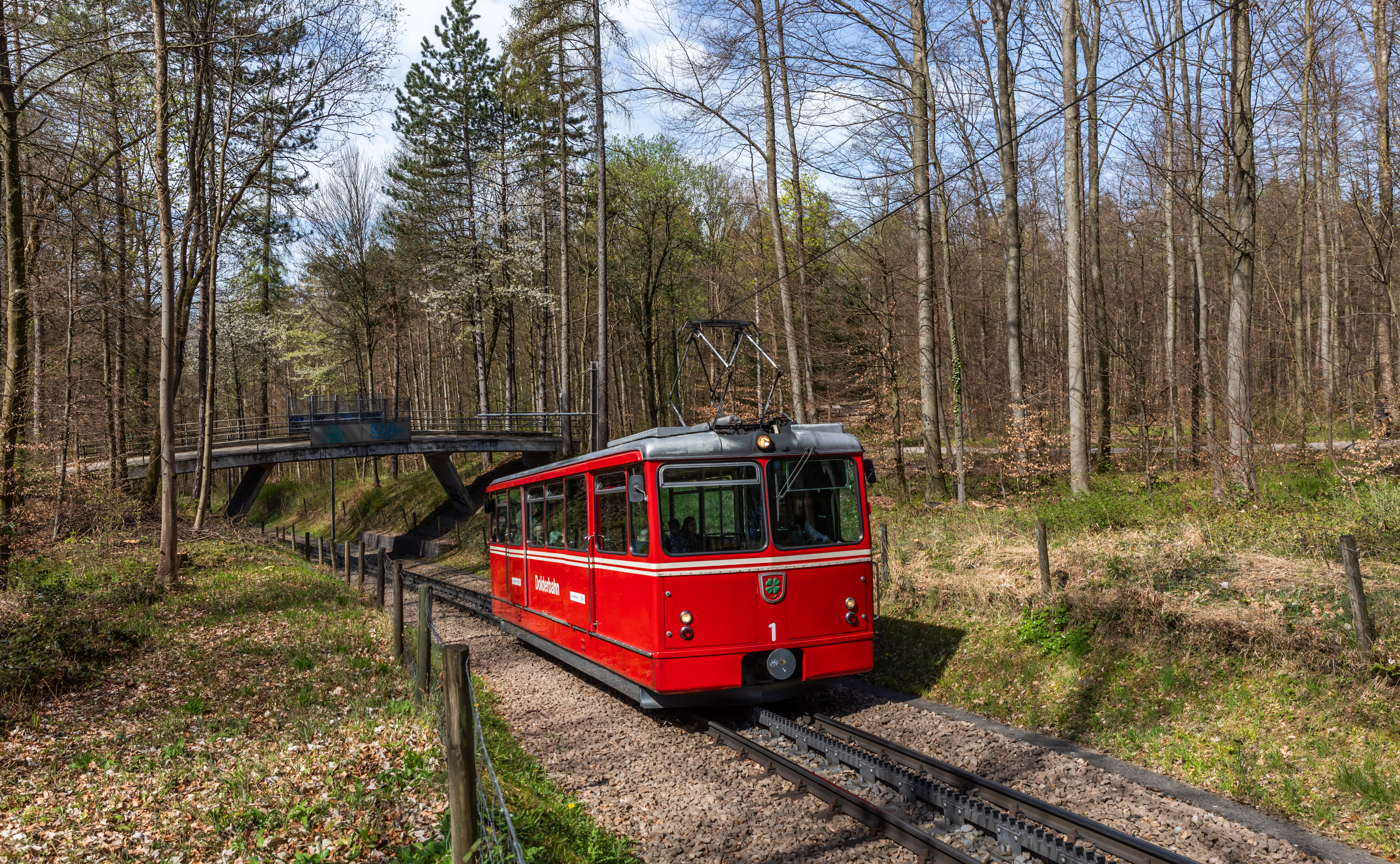
Railcar Bhe 1/2 1 (SLM) approaching Bergstation Dolder

After the conversion from a funicular to a rack railway, the line was operated by a pair of four-wheel rack railcars, each of which could carry 100 passengers. The cars were electrically driven off a 600 volt direct current overhead supply and were propelled by a cog-wheel attached to the downhill axle of each vehicle. They were built by the Swiss Locomotive and Machine Works, with electrical equipment from Brown, Boveri & Cie, in 1972. The two railcars carried the designations Bhe 1/2 1 and Bhe 1/2 2. Their operation began in 1973.

=== 2024 Stadler rolling stock ===
In June 2021, the Verkehrsbetriebe Zürich ordered two new railcars from Stadler Rail at Bussnang to replace the existing pair of cars used on the line. The new railcars were scheduled to be delivered by mid-2024 and cost SFr10.6m. They feature step-free access with a smaller gap from the platforms than the 1973 railcars, and two wheelchair spaces. They can carry up to 74 passengers with 19 seated spaces. The designations Bhe 1/2 1 and Bhe 1/2 2 were kept, in line with the replaced 1973 railcars.

In March 2024, the first new railcar was placed onto the tracks, replacing one of the 1973 railcars while running alongside the other still operational railcar for testing. The test phase ended in August 2024, allowing the first new railcar to begin service with passengers. The second railcar was also delivered in the same month and began service in September, allowing the operation schedule to return to regular service.

== Operation ==
The line is 1.3 km (0.81 mi) long and overcomes a height difference of 162 m (531.5 ft). It is built to metre gauge (3 ft 3 3/8 in gauge), uses the Strub rack system and is single track with a single intermediate passing loop. The passing loop is situated between Titlisstrasse and Waldhaus Dolder stations and features flexible rack turnouts at both ends. In line with its funicular origins, the line has no depot and no track connection to any other line. The cars are stabled and maintained in the terminal stations.

The line runs from 06.20 until 23.30 every day, with services running every 10, 15 or 20 minutes depending on the time of day. The journey time is approximately 5 minutes. The standard Zürcher Verkehrsverbund zonal fare tariffs apply, with the whole of the line being within fare zone 110 (Zürich city, formerly zone 10).

== Gallery ==
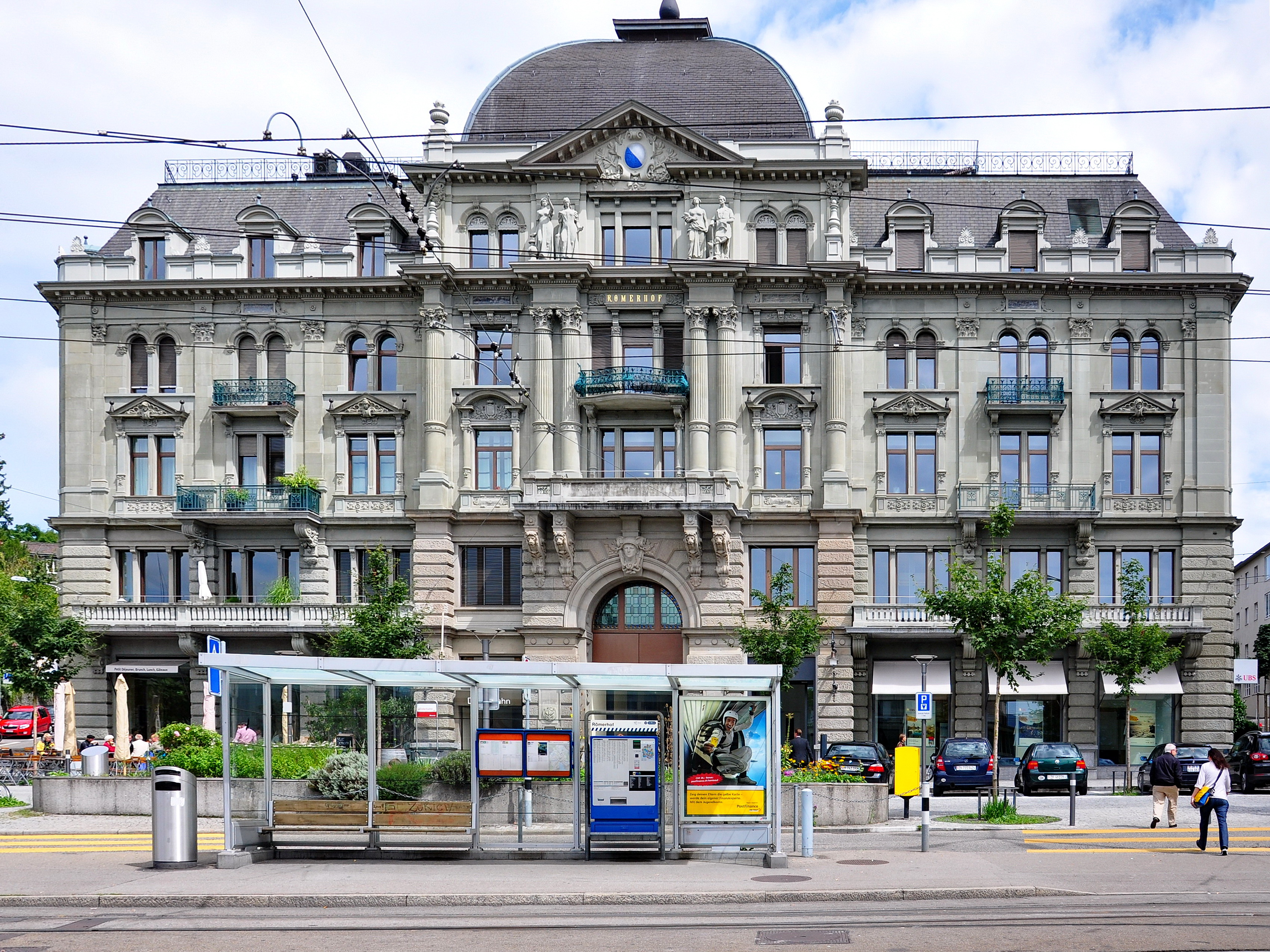
Römerhof, the lower terminus

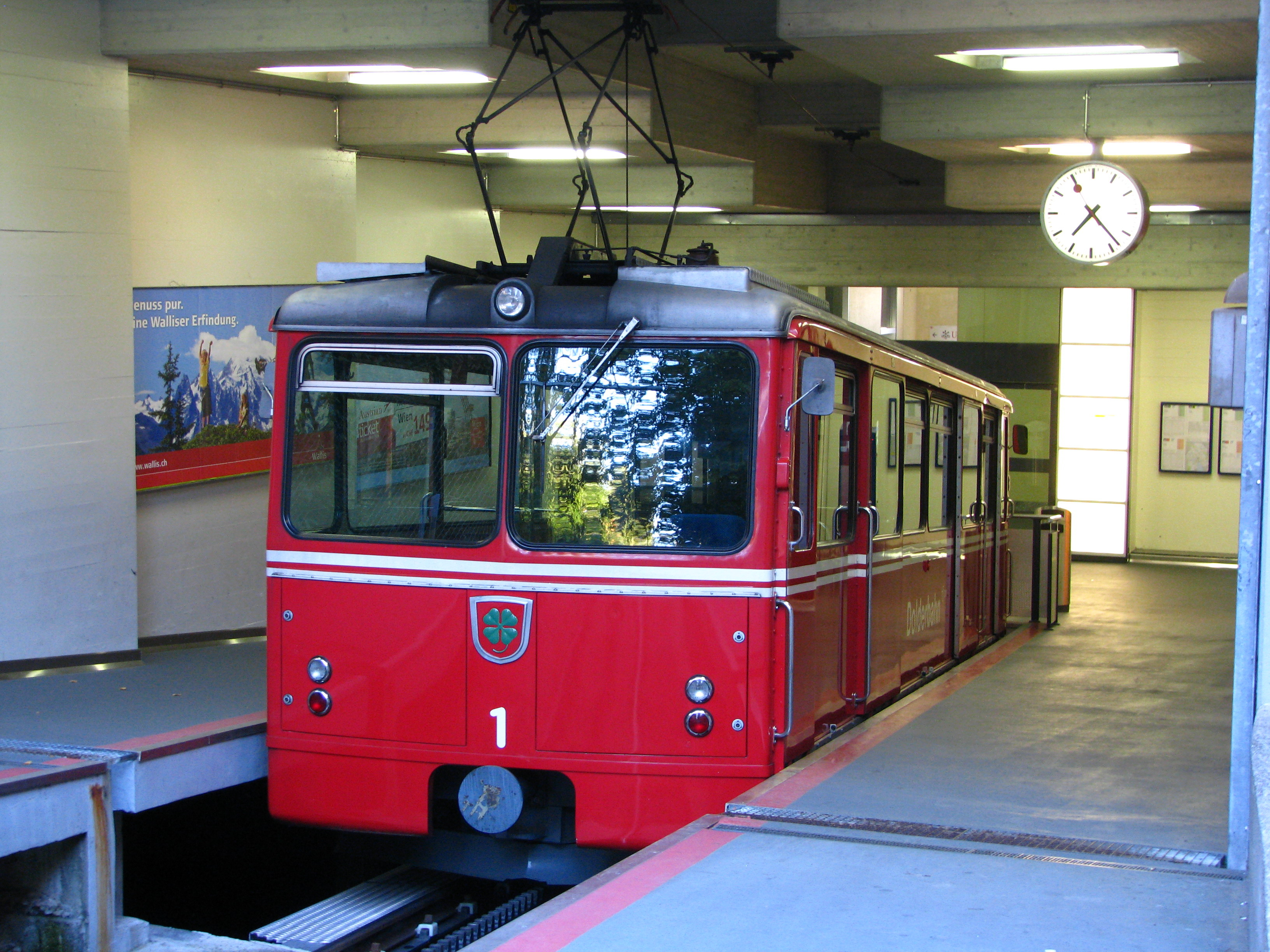
Railcar Bhe 1/2 1 (SLM) in the lower terminus

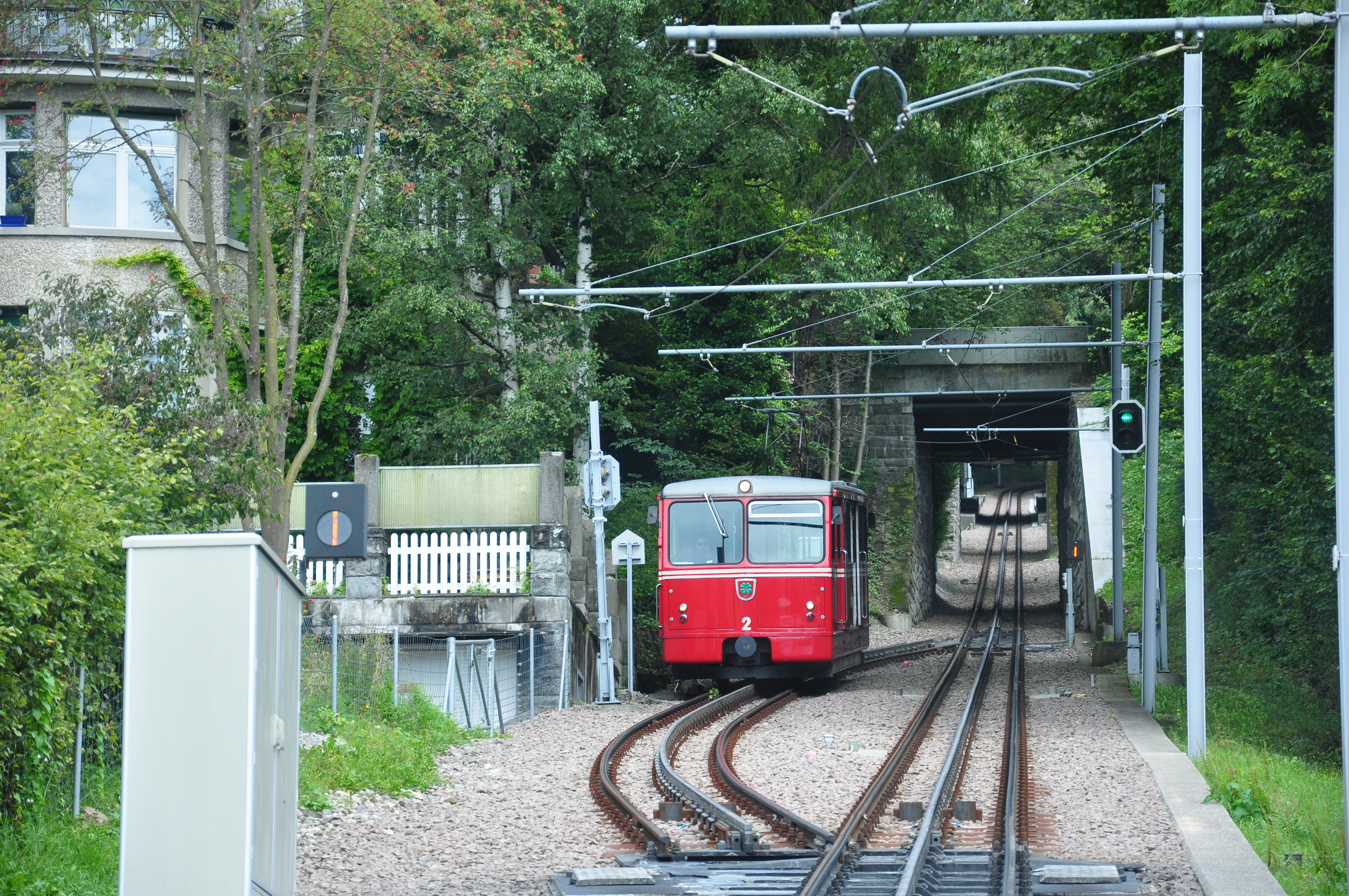
Railcar Bhe 1/2 2 (SLM) at the intermediate passing loop, showing unusual flexible point system

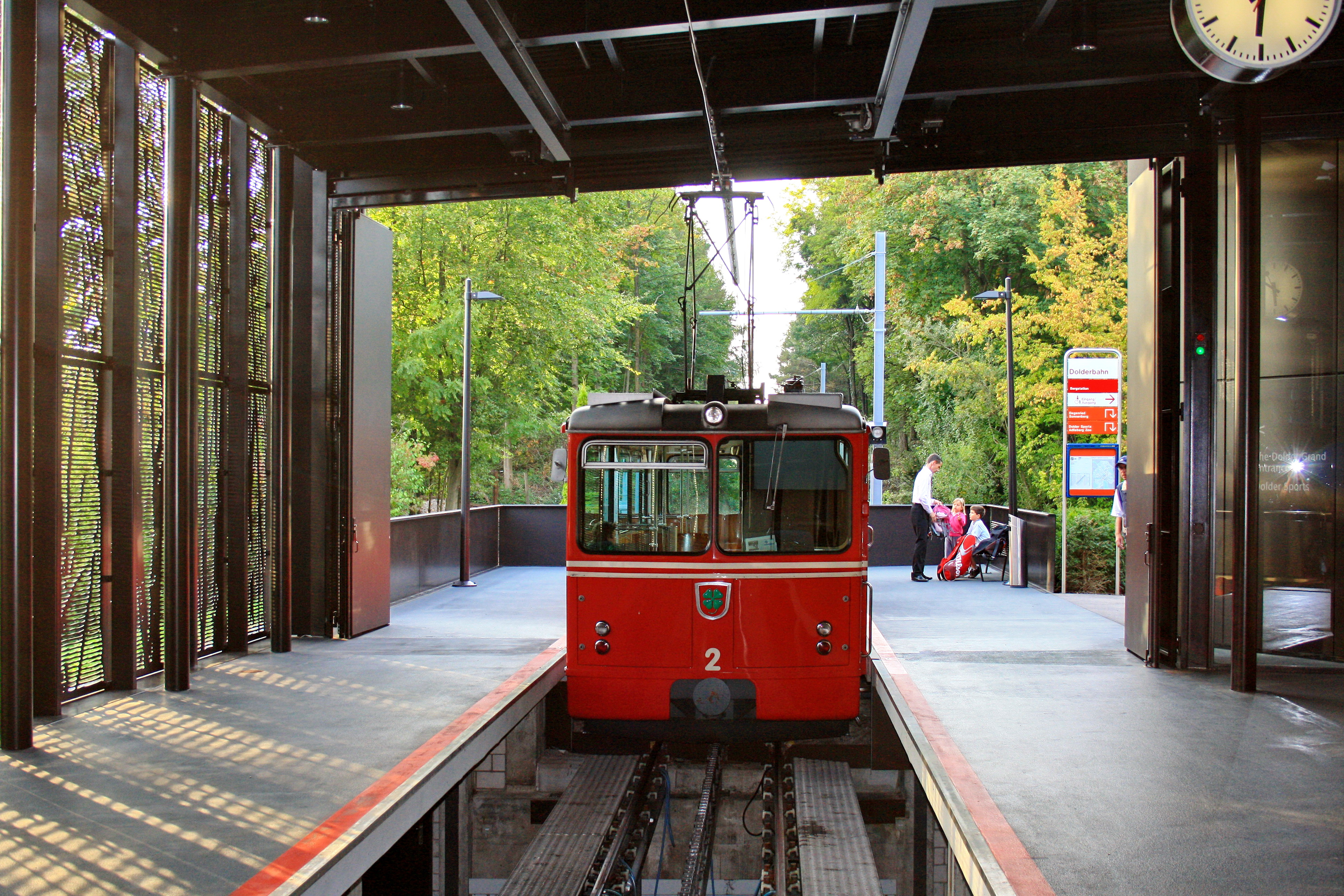
Railcar Bhe 1/2 2 (SLM) in the upper terminus

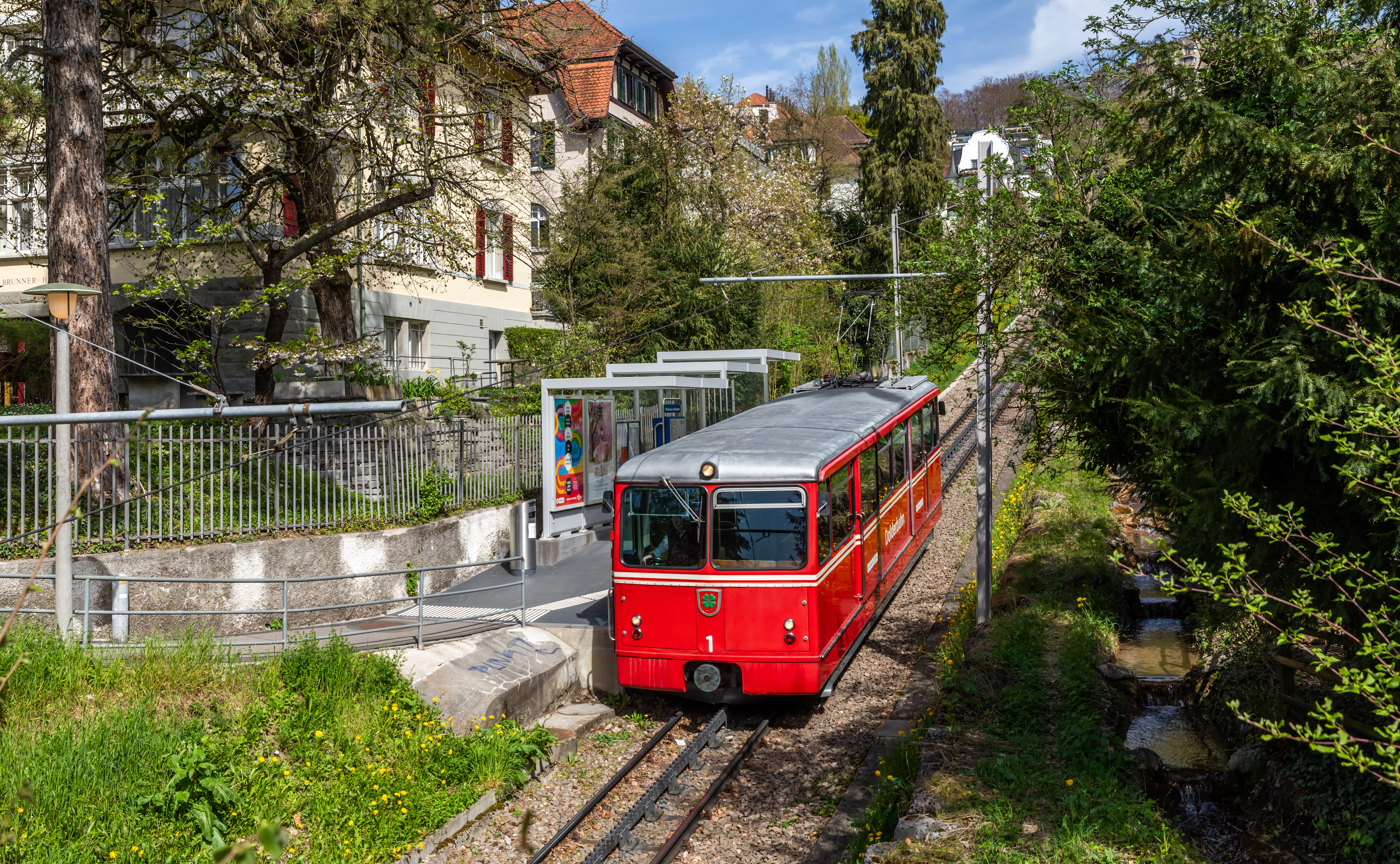
Railcar Bhe 1/2 1 (SLM) at Titlisstrasse

== See also ==
- Public transport in Zurich
- List of funicular railways
- List of funiculars in Switzerland
- List of rack railways
- List of Swiss rack railways
