= DB Class V 200 =

Class of 86 German twin-engined diesel-hydraulic locomotives

DB Class V200.0 DB Class 220 SBB Am 4/4
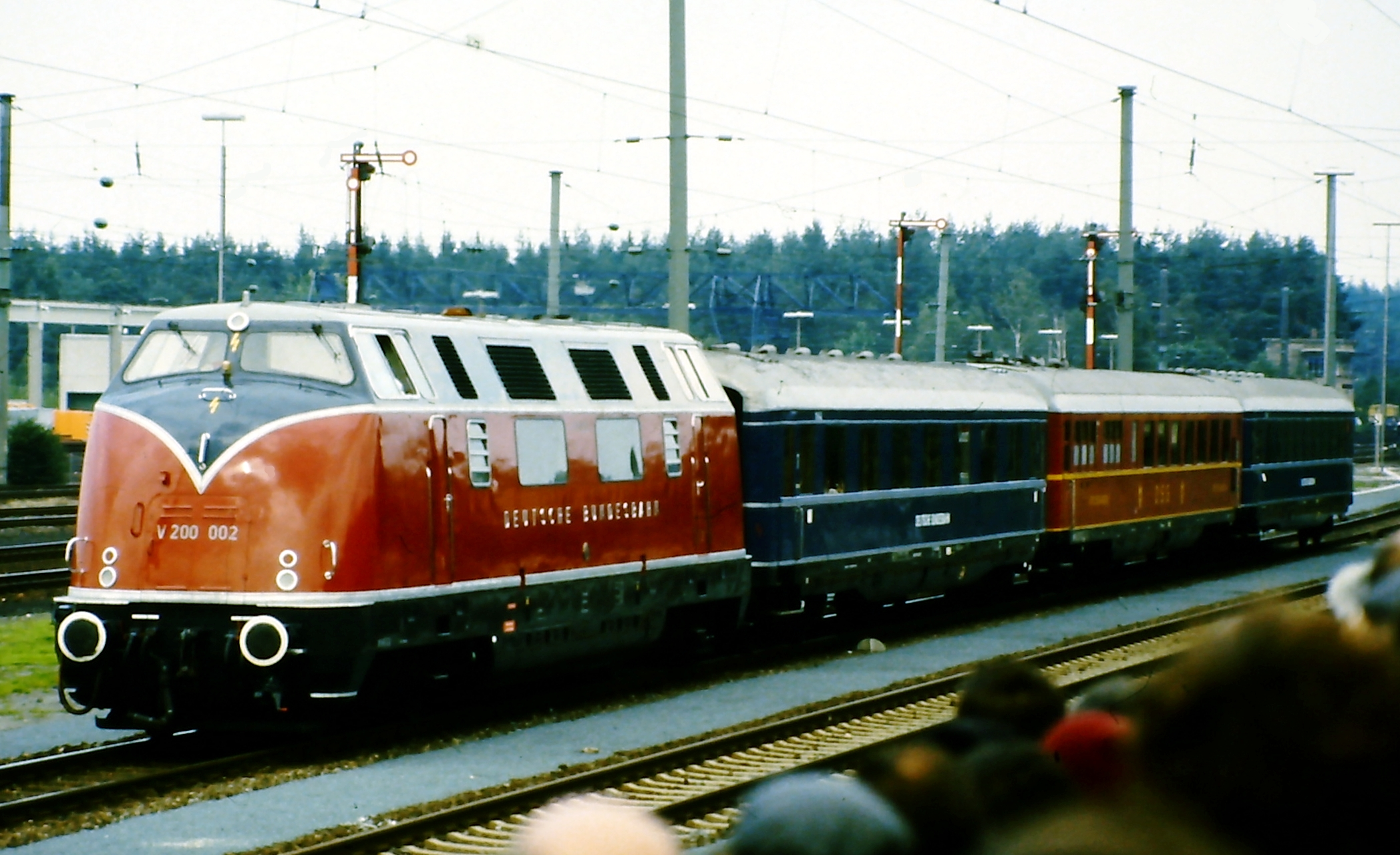
- Prototype museum engine V 200 002 in 1985
Type and origin
- Power type: Diesel-hydraulic
- Builder: Krauss-Maffei; Maschinenbau Kiel
- Build date: 1953; 1956–1958
- Total produced: 86
Specifications
- Configuration
  - UIC: B′B′
- Gauge: 1,435 mm (4 ft 8 1/2 in)
- Wheel diameter: 950 mm (3 ft 1 3/8 in)
- Wheelbase: 14,700 mm (48 ft 2 3/4 in)
  - Bogie: 3,200 mm (10 ft 6 in)
- Pivot centres: 11,500 mm (37 ft 8 3/4 in)
- Length
  - Over buffers: Prototypes: 18,470 mm (60 ft 7 1/8 in); Production: 18,530 mm (60 ft 9 1/2 in)
- Height: 4,160 mm (13 ft 7 3/4 in)
- Axle load: c. 20.0 t (19.7 long tons; 22.0 short tons)
- Service weight: c. 80.0 t (78.7 long tons; 88.2 short tons)
- Fuel type: Diesel fuel
- Fuel capacity: 2,700 L (590 imp gal; 710 US gal)
- Prime mover: Two Maybach MD 650 or MTU MB 12 V 493 TZ
- RPM
  - Maximum RPM: 1,500
- Engine type: Two V12 four-stroke diesels
- Cylinders: 12 each engine
- Transmission: Hydraulic
- Train heating: Steam
- Loco brake: direct-release, compressed air brake + aux. brake, K-GPR mZ; later: graduated, compressed air brake + aux. brake, WS-GPP2R mZ
- Train brakes: Knorr brake
Performance figures
- Maximum speed: 140 km/h (87 mph)
- Power output
  - Continuous: 2,200 PS (1,620 kW; 2,170 hp)
- Tractive effort: 234 kN (53,000 lb_{f})
Career
- Numbers: V 200 001 – V 200 086; 220 001 – 220 086 from 1968
- Retired: 1984

DB Class V 200 (also known as Class 220) was the first series production (Note: The ten V 80 locomotives had been produced in the year before.) diesel-hydraulic express locomotive of the German Deutsche Bundesbahn and – as Am 4/4 – of the SBB-CFF-FFS in Switzerland.

== History ==
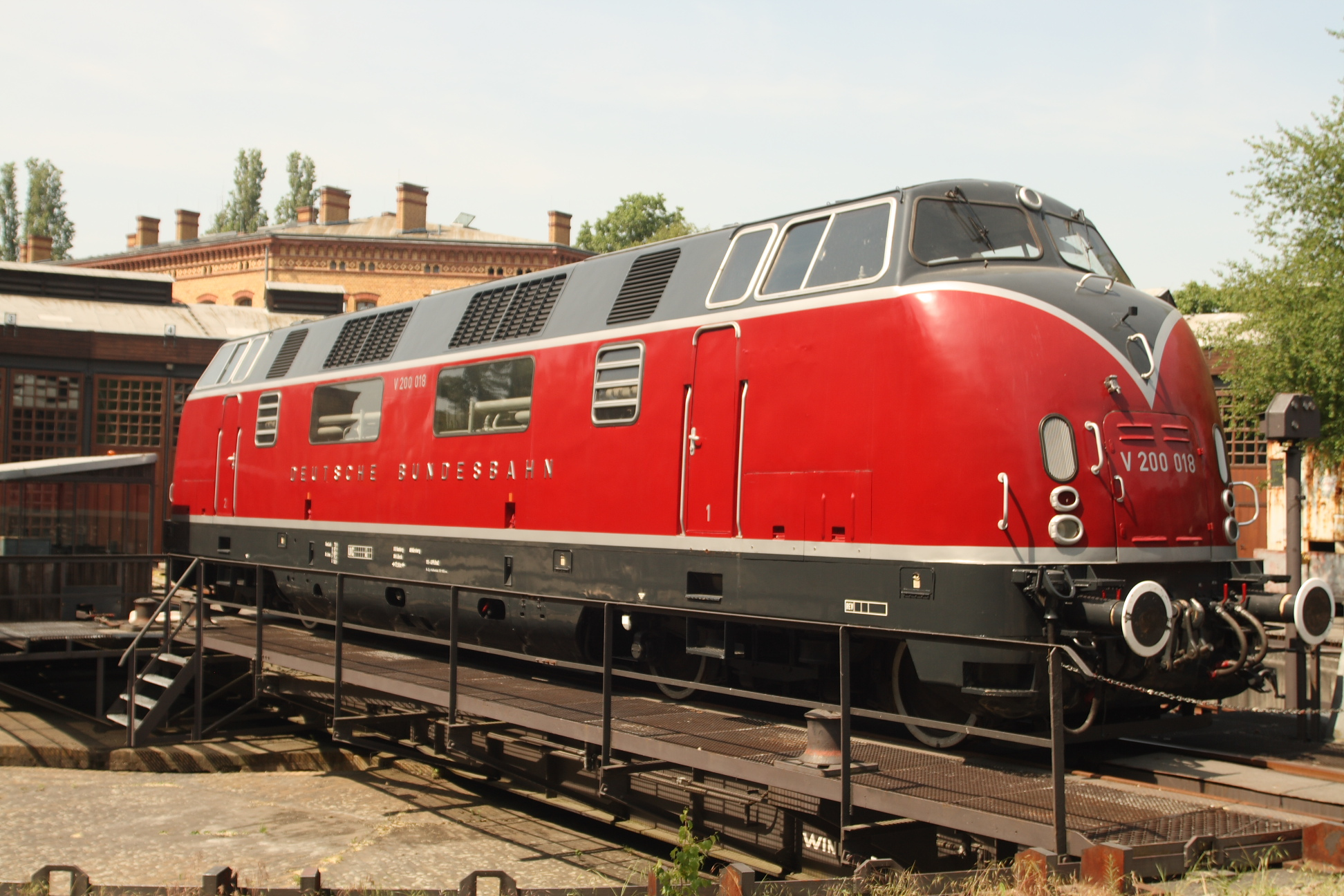
A sideways view.

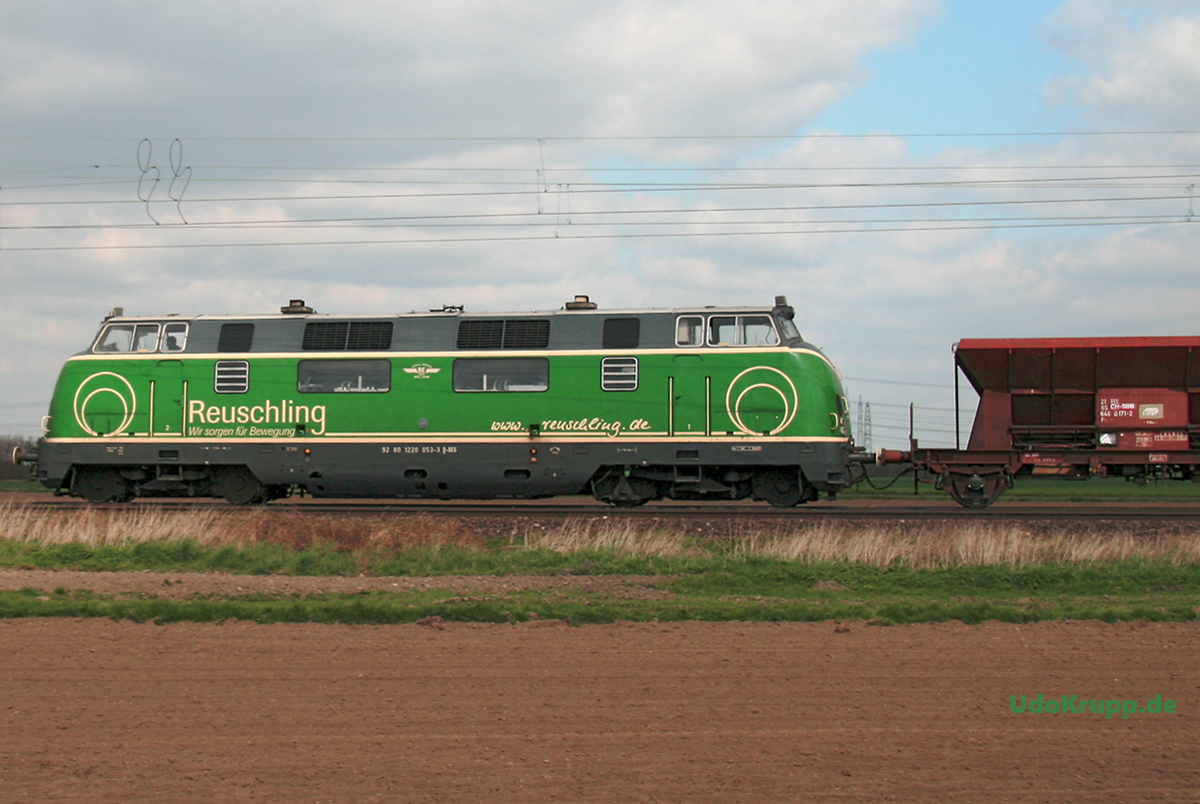
220 053 at Brühl, 10.04.2009

=== DB Service ===
Five prototypes of the V 200 were built by Krauss-Maffei in 1953/1954. Full production began in 1956, with 61 engines being built by Krauss-Maffei and 20 by MaK.

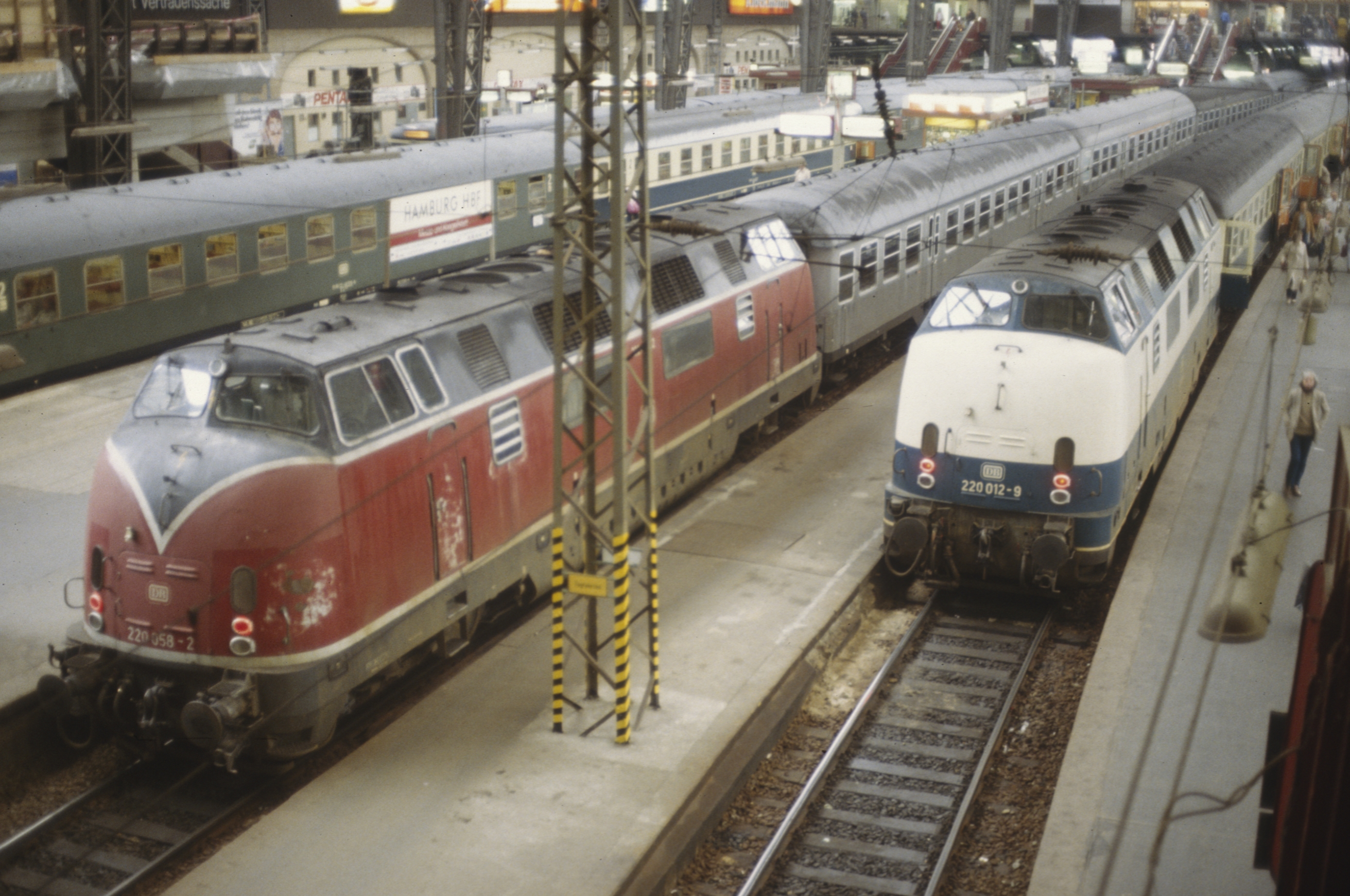
DB V 200s in diverse colours at Hamburg Hauptbahnhof, 1982

These five V 200 prototypes were put through extensive testing, the aim being to ensure the production locomotives would be as reliable as the technology and maintenance standards of the 1950s allowed. In 1955 one locomotive travelled under its own power through Yugoslavia, Greece and Turkey partly as a test and partly to demonstrate the locomotive's capability to potential customers in those countries.

Initially the V 200 hauled express trains on all main lines, replacing the DRG Class 05, DRG Class 03 and DRG Class 01. Following the electrification of many main lines the V 200 was used increasingly for commuter trains and freight trains, but the Hamburg-Westerland, Hamburg-Lübeck-Copenhagen and Munich-Lindau lines still saw the V 200 hauling express trains.

From 1962, the V 200.0 was followed by the more powerful DB Class V 200.1, later Class 221.

From 1977, the V 200.0s were concentrated in northern German engine sheds (Bahnbetriebswerke). These two-engine locomotives were more expensive to operate than single-engine locomotives like DB Class V 160. A further disadvantage was its steam heating system for carriages, since replaced by electric train heating. The last V 200 went out of service with the DB in 1984.

=== Post-DB service ===
==== Saudi Arabia ====
In 1977 two V 200.0 locomotives were sold to the Heitkamp organisation which had been contracted by the Saudi Arabian Government to carry out repairs and maintenance to a 565 km standard gauge railway line between Dharan and Riyadh. In 1978 a further three V 200s were sold to Heitkamp and shipped to Saudi Arabia. In 1979 the repair and maintenance project, including the locomotives, was taken over by the Greek construction company Archirodon. In 1982 Archirodon bought two further V 200s to break up in order to provide spare parts – particularly engines and transmissions – for the surviving V 200 in Saudi Arabia. These locomotives never went to Saudi Arabia. In Archirodon service most of V 200s were withdrawn due to accidents, the locomotives involved being stripped of parts to keep the remaining locomotives operational. In 1999 at least one damaged locomotive was still extant at Al Hufuf (220 021), along with one complete locomotive (220 046) which was cut up in 2002.

==== Italy ====
Between 1982 and 1990, thirteen V 200.0s were sold to various private railway operators in Italy. These were:
Ferrovia Suzzara-Ferrara (FSF) – Three locomotives in 1982;
Cosfer, an infrastructure maintenance contractor, – One locomotive in 1982 and three in 1984;
Ferrovie Padane (FP) – Two locomotives in 1984;
Impresa Veltri, an infrastructure maintenance contractor, – One locomotive in 1984;
IPE Locomotori, a locomotive handler, – One locomotive in 1985 which was scrapped in 1987;
Impresa Valditerra, infrastructure maintenance contractor, – One locomotive in 1986;
Ferrovie Nord Brescia (FNB) – One locomotive in 1990. (then sold to FSF)

In 2000 FSF and FP were merged into a larger company, Ferrovie Emilia-Romagna (FER). In 2003 FER acquired three more V 200.0s from the various track maintenance contractors based in Italy. Between 2001 and 2005, all of the FER V 200.0 locomotives underwent refurbishment in Zagreb which included replacement of the existing Maybach or Mercedes engines with Caterpillar D3508 V8 engines, capable of 810 kW, and modern digital engine control systems in place of the original Brown-Boveri electro-mechanical control system. All the FER locomotives are fitted with the Voith L306r transmission. The locomotives were painted in a rather garish Italian tri-colour (green-white-red) livery.

==== Greece ====
After end-of-service with DB in 1988, 20 V200 locomotives were sold to Greece. During the 1990s, they were then decommissioned one by one and left to rust and rot, until 2002 when all 20 were bought by Prignitzer Eisenbahn GmbH. A total of 11 were restored to their former glory, and subsequently used for cargo, and in repair and maintenance operations.

==== Spain ====
In 1988 one of the Cosfer (Italian) locomotives was transported to Spain to work on the construction of the RENFE AVE lines. This locomotive was still operational in Spain during 2018.

==== France ====
In 1985 and 1986 the French infrastructure maintenance company DEHE-Montcocol purchased four V 200.0 for use on construction and maintenance works in France and Belgium. These locomotives were overhauled at the DB works in Nuremberg. In 1987 they were shipped to Algeria to work on a new standard gauge railway construction project. In 1991 the locomotives returned to France to work on new TGV lines. All were scrapped in France between 1997 and 1999.

==== Switzerland ====
In October 1986, seven V 200.0s were sold to the Swiss SBB-CFF-FFS, numbered (SBB Am 4/4 18461–18467). They remained in service until 1997 and the six survivors were sold into private ownership in Germany. These locomotives were refurbished to the standard dictated by SBB-CFF-FFS by Regentalbahn AG of Viechtach, Germany. This adaption included the installation of the Integra-Signum train protection system and of white/red switchable Fresnel lantern top headlights according to Swiss regulation (for emergency signalling); the ditch-lights and nearby tail-lights remained unchanged. On the photograph, 220 053-3 of Brohltalbahn still sports the Swiss top headlight. Refurbishment included additional silencing of the engines. SBB-CFF-FFS stipulated that all locomotives should be fitted with Maybach MD650 engines and Voith L306rb transmissions. In service the locomotives were used to haul trains over electrified railway lines where the electrification was de-energised due to infrastructure works.

==== Algeria ====
Regentalbahn AG also refurbished one V 200.0 locomotive for the National Railways of Algeria (SNTF) in 1987. This locomotive was used on track maintenance works along with the four DEHE-Montcocol V 200.0. The loco – formerly 220 048 – was left behind in Algeria by its owners when the track refurbishment work was completed, and has been stored for many years at Constantine depot.

==== Albania ====
Regentalbahn AG also were sold five V 200.1 locomotives for the National Railways of Albania (HSH) in 1989, locomotives 221.118, 140, 125, 131, 109. These locos, painted in a nice red, were used with very good results but had to be stored early because the very scarce care of the Albanian railway men.

==== Germany ====
It is still possible to see V 200.0 locomotives in Germany. The following locomotives are preserved in museums or operational, generally operating on private charter trains on DB main lines or hauling freight.

The sole surviving prototype V 200 001 is owned by the Franconian Museum Railway in Nuremberg. In 2010 they started the project www.v200-001.de to raise funds and begin restoration.

The DB Museum owned a second prototype V 200 002 until it was destroyed by fire at the museum on 17 October 2005. It also owns V 200 007 which is under the care of the BSW Gruppe at Lübeck. Both locomotives had been active since 1984. V 200 007 is not operational as it is waiting for funds to be made available for new tyres. V 200 007 is not on public display.

V 200 009 is on static indoor display at the Rügen Railway & Technology Museum, Prora, on Rügen Island.

V 200 017 is owned by Classic Train Tours AG of Düsseldorf and is in operational condition. It was fully refurbished and re-engined by WLH Reuschling at Hattingen. It is now fitted with CAT D3508 engines. Additionally the steam heating equipment has been removed and two small diesel generator sets installed, one for train heating and the other to supply auxiliary power to the locomotive. V 200 077 is also owned by CTT and is being refurbished to the same standard.

V 200 018 is on static indoor display at the Deutsches Technikmuseum in Berlin which is housed on the site of former Anhalter Bahnhof depot. On certain days the museum places locomotives outside the roundhouse for better photographic opportunity.

V 200 033 is owned and operated by the Hammer Eisenbahn Museum at Hamm. It operates private charter trains over DB main lines and also over the lines of the WLE from Hamm to Lippborg. It is the only authentic example of a V 200.0 still operational, retaining all the important original features, including Maybach engines, Mekydro transmissions and steam heating equipment.

V 200 053 is owned and operated by Brohltal-Eisenbahn GmbH, where it is numbered "D9". It was refurbished and re-engined by Gmeinder and is now fitted with CAT D3508 engines. This locomotive is primarily a freight engine although it has worked passenger trains in summer months.

220 058 & 220 071 are both on outdoor display at the Technikmuseum Speyer. Neither of these locomotives carry truly authentic liveries nor are they mechanically complete.

V200 013, V200 015 and V200 016 that were previously owned by Swiss Railways are still in existence at Altenbeken and Kornwestheim.

== Technology ==
The V 200 had two fast-running (1500 RPM) V12 diesel engines. The transmission was hydraulic, each engine drove one bogie set via a hydraulic torque converter. The maximum speed was 140 km/h. The prototypes had a maximum power of 1,471 kW, the V 200.0 had a power of 1,618 kW. Unlike some other diesel-hydraulic locomotives the V 200 was renowned for its high reliability. Maybach (type MD650), Mercedes-Benz (type MB820Bb) and MAN (type L 12 V 18/21) engines were used. The hydraulic transmissions fitted to the locomotives were supplied by Maybach (type Mekydro K104U) and Voith (type LT306r/rb). Although differing in several ways – for example the Mekydro K104 transmission had a single torque converter and four mechanical gear stages while the Voith L306 had three different-sized torque converters – the engines and transmissions were designed so that the various types were completely interchangeable, not just amongst V 200.0 but with other locomotive types (V80/V100) and diesel multiple units (VT11, VT08 & VT12) that DB ordered around the same time as the V 200.0. It was not uncommon to find a single locomotive with one Mercedes engine and one Maybach unit running together. The MAN engines were only fitted to five locomotives in 1959 as an experiment and these locomotives eventually had their engines replaced with the more common Maybach or Mercedes engines.

To reduce weight, the locomotives had unusual inside framed bogies. Combined with the high driving position and rounded body, this gave the V 200 a very distinctive appearance.

== DR Class V 200 ==
The Deutsche Reichsbahn had its own class with the designation V 200, later renamed DR Class 120. These were Soviet Union diesel-electric locomotives, nicknamed Taigatrommel (Taiga and trommel as drum in English i.e. Taiga Drum ), referring to their typical noise and a cynical reference to the Siberian landscape of their Soviet Union's homeland.

After the reunification of Germany these engines were classified by the new Deutsche Bahn as Class 220 as well, since all Western German V 200 units were out of service by that time.

== V 200 based developments & exports ==
=== British Rail Warship Class ===
The British Railways "Warship" class locomotives built in Britain between 1958 and 1962 were based on Krauss-Maffei's V 200.0 design, including the distinctive shape. British Railways licensed the design from Krauss Maffei and various British engineering firms built the different component parts, also under license.

=== ML2200 (JŽ D66/761) ===
Based on V 200 series, in 1956 Krauss Maffei built three ML2200 (designated JŽ D66, later 761) series locomotives for Yugoslav Railways. The number of axles was increased from 4 to 6 to cope with the low maximum axle load on Yugoslavian tracks. The locomotives remained in working order until 1991 and are now stored at a railway museum in a suburb of Belgrade.

=== ML2200/ML3000 – V 300 001/230 001-0 ===
A fourth example of the ML 2200 C'C' was built at Krauss-Maffei's own expense, awaiting a buyer, but the Yugoslavian state railways made no further purchases. In November 1957 Krauss-Maffei commenced a rebuild of the locomotive with more powerful engines and bigger transmissions, in the hope that it would be suitable for the Deutsche Bundesbahn. The designation given to the locomotive by the builder was ML3000 C'C'. Krauss-Maffei had hoped that DB would order more of the ML3000 design to replace steam locomotives in freight service, but instead DB opted for a modest uprating of the original V 200.0 in the form of the V 200.1. Eventually DB bought the locomotive and it worked until being retired in 1975.

=== ML2700CC (TCDD DH27) ===
In response to the 1955 visit to Yugoslavia, Greece and Turkey by one of the V200 prototypes, Turkish Railways (TCDD) ordered three Krauss Maffei ML2700 locomotives in 1960. As with the Yugoslavian ML2200 locomotives the Turkish locomotives had six axles, however the external design was completely different from the V200 carbody style with the final product looking more like contemporary US road switcher locomotives with a European twist. The locomotives worked freight and passenger trains radiating from Ankara until TCDD retired them in 1982.

=== RENFE Class 340 ===
Thirty two locomotives of this type were built, ten by Krauss Maffei and exported to Spain, and twenty-two built in Spain by Babcock & Wilcox. Being Iberian gauge vehicles the overall dimensions are larger, and the engines are 16 cylinder versions, giving a total engine power of 4000 hp.

== V200.0/220 Class details ==
| Locomotive numbers | Builder's number | Date in to DB service | Date withdrawn from DB service | Notes | Picture |
|---|---|---|---|---|---|
| V 200 001; 220 001-2 | KM 17900 | 16 July 1954 | 10 July 1980 | Prototype. Completed 16 December 1953. Privately preserved 17 December 1981, currently being restored by FME, Nürnberg | |
| V 200 002; 220 002-0 | KM 17901 | 4 March 1954 | 15 June 1978 | Prototype. Transferred to DB Museum 24 December 1984. Allocated number 288 201-7 (not carried). Fully operational until destroyed by fire in Nürnberg 17 October 2005 | Thumb |
| V 200 003; 220 003-8 | KM 17902 | 12 March 1954 | 15 June 1978 | Prototype. Cut up at AW Trier by April 1982 | |
| V 200 004; 220 004-6 | KM 17903 | 24 March 1954 | 6 March 1980 | Prototype. Cut up at AW Trier by March 1982 | |
| V 200 005; 220 005-3 | KM 17904 | 23 February 1954 | 10 April 1980 | Prototype. Cut up at AW Trier by February 1982 | |
| V 200 006; 220 006-1 | MaK 2000 006 | 21 September 1956 | 4 June 1978 | 8 August 1978: "Heitkamp 6" (for spares); 06.1982: to FSF, Italy, as 220 006; 1999: Re-engined (Isotta-Fraschini) and re-numbered as 18 LD 220R01; 2003: to FER, Italy; 2005: Refurbished & re-engined (CAT) | |
| V 200 007; 220 007-9 | MaK 2000 007 | 8 November 1956 | 5 March 1984 | Worked a number of special trains after withdrawal as V 200 007. Transferred to DB Museum 1 January 1985, under care of Lübeck BSW Gruppe. Allocated number 288 202-2 (Not carried). Was fully operational, has been stopped for some years at BW Lübeck awaiting funds for new tyres. | |
| V 200 008; 220 008-8 | MaK 2000 008 | 17 April 1957 | 12 August 1974 | Damaged in accident at Hamburg on 26 May 1974, scrapped AW Nürnberg 1975. | |
| V 200 009; 220 009-5 | MaK 2000 009 | 20 May 1957 | 5 February 1984 | Worked a number of special trains after withdrawal as V 200 009. 7 June 1985: Unterfränkisches Verkehrs-museum Gemünden (stored at Bw Gemünden 1986–1988); After two aborted attempts to restore the locomotive to operational condition, V 200 009 has been on display at the Eisenbahn und Technik Museum, Prora (Rügen) since March 2001. | |
| V 200 010; 220 010-3 | MaK 2000 010 | 23 May 1957 | 21 September 1983 | 1986: Scrapped by Layritz, Penzberg | |
| V 200 011; 220 011-1 | MaK 2000 011 | 6 June 1957 | 14 October 1980 | 21 October 1982: to FSF, Italy as 220 011; 2003: Transferred to FER, Italy; 2004: Re-furbished & re-engined (CAT) | |
| V 200 012; 220 012-9 | MaK 2000 012 | 2 July 1957 | 4 March 1983 | 1 August 1985: to Zink, Luitpoldhütte (scrap dealer); 06.1987: Regentalbahn AG (for spares); Scrapped by Fa. Friedl, Plattling between 1996 and 1999 | |
| V 200 013; 220 013-7 | MaK 2000 013 | 13 July 1957 | 1 August 1984 | 26 November 1986: Sold to SBB, Overhauled by Regentalbahn AG. Re-numbered Am 4/4 18461. 28 February 1995: Withdrawn from SBB service. 1997: Sold to GES at Kornwestheim, Germany. Re-numbered 220 013-7; 1 July 2000: Sold to Eisenbahn Betriebs Gesellschaft at Altenbeken, Germany. | |
| V 200 014; 220 014-5 | MaK 2000 014 | 20 July 1957 | 1 August 1984 | 26 November 1986: Sold to SBB, Overhauled by Regentalbahn AG. Re-numbered Am 4/4 18462. 28 February 1994: Withdrawn from SBB service. 1996: Scrapped by SBB | |
| V 200 015; 220 015-2 | MaK 2000 015 | 2 August 1957 | 1 August 1984 | 26 November 1986: Sold to SBB, Overhauled by Regentalbahn AG. Re-numbered Am 4/4 18463. 30 November 1995: Withdrawn from SBB service. 1997: Sold to GES at Kornwestheim, Germany. Re-numbered 220 015-2 | |
| V 200 016; 220 016-0 | MaK 2000 016 | 2 August 1957 | 7 August 1982 | 26 November 1986: Sold to SBB, Overhauled by Regentalbahn AG. Re-numbered Am 4/4 18464. 30 November 1996: Withdrawn from SBB service. 1997: Sold to GES, Germany. Re-numbered 220 016-0 | |
| V 200 017; 220 017-8 | MaK 2000 017 | 21 September 1957 | 17 November 1982 | 26 November 1986: Sold to SBB, Overhauled by Regentalbahn AG. Re-numbered Am 4/4 18465. 30 November 1996: Withdrawn from SBB service. 1997: Sold to Historischer Schienenverkehr GmbH, Gelsenkirchen-Bismark. Re-numbered 220 017-8; 2000: Sold to Classic Train Tours AG, Düsseldorf. Refurbished & re-engined (CAT) re-numbered V 200 017. Operational. | |
| V 200 018; 220 018-6 | MaK 2000 018 | 2 September 1957 | 1 August 1984 | 1985: to Zink, Luitpoldhütte (scrap dealer); 1990: Cosmetically restored by Regentalbahn AG; 1991: On display at Deutsches Technikmuseum Berlin | |
| V 200 019; 220 019-4 | MaK 2000 019 | 1 October 1957 | 11 June 1981 | 04.1983: Scrapped at AW Nürnberg | |
| V 200 020; 220 020-2 | MaK 2000 020 | 25 October 1957 | 30 September 1982 | 16 January 1985: Sold to Layritz, Penzberg. 1986: Scrapped. | |
| V200 021; 220 021-0 | MaK 2000 021 | 10 October 1957 | 12 August 1977 | 2 August 1977: Sold to Heitkamp, exported to Saudi Arabia. Re-numbered "Heitkamp 1"; 28 October 1979 sold to Archirodon, Saudi Arabia. Re-numbered 276-01. Believed to have been damaged beyond repair during accident with a crane. 06.1999: Known to be stripped of usable parts at Al Hufuf. 2002: Presumed scrapped. | |
| V 200 022; 220 022-8 | MaK 2000 022 | 24 October 1957 | 30 September 1982 | Scrapped at AW Nürnberg by 06.1984 | |
| V 200 023; 220 023-6 | MaK 2000 023 | 1 November 1957 | 5 February 1983 | 1 August 1985: to Zink, Luitpoldhütte (scrap dealer); 06.1987: Regentalbahn AG (for spares); Scrapped by Fa. Friedl, Plattling between 1996 and 1999 | |
| V 200 024; 220 024-4 | MaK 2000 024 | 15 November 1957 | 31 March 1978 | 11 January 1978: to Heitkamp, exported to Saudi Arabia. Re-numbered "Heitkamp 3"; 28 October 1979 sold to Archirodon, Saudi Arabia as source of spares. Believed to be scrapped. | |
| V 200 025; 220 025-1 | MaK 2000 025 | 4 January 1958 | 1 August 1984 | 16 January 1985: Sold to Layritz, Penzberg. Scrapped by 1986. | |
| V 200 026; 220 026-9 | KM 18270 | 11 September 1956 | 5 February 1983 | 16 January 1985: Sold to Layritz, Penzberg. Scrapped by 1986. | 220 026 stabled in the yard at Stade between duties 8 Oct 1982 |
| V 200 027; 220 027-7 | KM 18271 | 4 December 1956 | 30 December 1982 | 08.1983: Scrapped at AW Nürnberg. | |
| V 200 028; 220 028-5 | KM 18272 | 1 October 1956 | 26 August 1981 | 1982: Sold to Cosfer, Italy, re-numbered T5662; 1997: Transferred to Salcef, Italy. 1 March 2003: Sold to FER, Italy, re-numbered 220 028-5. | |
| V 200 029; 220 029-3 | KM 18273 | 19 October 1956 | 1 August 1984 | 4 December 1984: Sold to Veltri, Italy via WBB, Hattingen. Re-numbered T5719. 1 March 2003: Sold to FER, Italy, re-numbered 220 029-3. | |
| V 200 030; 220 030-1 | KM 18274 | 29 October 1956 | 5 February 1984 | 21 August 1985: Sold to Glaser, Germany, re-numbered V2204; 03.1987: Transferred to DEHE-Cogifer, France, re-numbered V2204 0301. Exported to Algeria. 1991: Returned to France for LGV construction work. Re-numbered 52012. 1999: Scrapped. | |
| V 200 031; 220 031-9 | KM 18275 | 2 November 1956 | 1 August 1984 | 9 November 1984: Sold to Layritz, Penzberg; 11.1984?: Sold to Cosfer, Italy, re-numbered T5614; 1988: Transferred to Comsa, Spain; 1999: Transferred to Salcef, Italy | |
| V 200 032; 220 032-7 | KM 18276 | 15 November 1956 | 15 March 1979 | 1980: Scrapped at AW Nürnberg | |
| V 200 033; 220 033-5 | KM 18277 | 16 November 1956 | 1 March 1984 | 24 October 1984: Preserved by Hammer Eisenbahnfreunde, Hamm. Operational. | |
| V 200 034; 220 034-3 | KM 18278 | 3 December 1956 | 16 January 1979 | 1980: Scrapped at AW Nürnberg | |
| V 200 035; 220 035-0 | KM 18279 | 3 December 1956 | 14 May 1978 | 8 August 1978: Sold to Heitkamp, for spare parts, as "Heitkamp 7" – number never carried. 12.1982: Scrapped at AW Nürnberg. | |
| V 200 036; 220 036-8 | KM 18280 | 5 December 1956 | 5 February 1984 | 10 January 1985: Sold to Layritz, Penzberg. 03.1986: Scrapped | |
| V 200 037; 220 037-6 | KM 18281 | 12 December 1956 | 5 February 1984 | 21 August 1985: Sold to Glaser, München. Re-numbered "V2203". 03.1987: Sold to Dehe-Cogifer, France, for use in Algeria. Re-numbered "V2203 0376"; 1991: Returned to France for LGV construction work. Re-numbered "52014". 1999: Scrapped. | |
| V 200 038; 220 038-4 | KM 18282 | 21 December 1956 | 1 August 1980 | 24 May 1980: Damaged beyond repair in shunting collision with 221 150 at Emden. 1981: Scrapped at AW Bremen. | |
| V 200 039; 220 039-2 | KM 18283 | 21 December 1956 | 1 August 1984 | 22 October 1984: Sold to Cosfer, Italy. Re-numbered "2904". 1988: Transferred to COMSA, Spain for AVE construction and maintenance work. Still active in 2008. | |
| V 200 040; 220 040-0 | KM 18284 | 12 January 1957 | 1 May 1983 | 16 April 1983: Involved in head-on collision with 218 488 at Bad Oldesloe. 04.1984: Scrapped at Bw Lübeck. | |
| V 200 041; 220 041-8 | KM 18285 | 5 January 1957 | 1 August 1984 | 22 October 1984: Sold to Cosfer, Italy. Re-numbered "T5697". 1993: Sold to Bufone, Italy. Re-numbered 220 041-8; 1994: Sold to FP, Italy. 2003: Transferred to FER, Italy. 2005: Re-furbished & re-engined (CAT). | |
| V 200 042; 220 042-6 | KM 18286 | 2 February 1957 | 19 August 1976 | 08.1976: Damaged beyond repair when fell off jacks at AW Nürnberg. Scrapped. | |
| V 200 043; 220 043-4 | KM 18287 | 1 February 1957 | 15 May 1983 | 16 January 1985: Sold to Layritz, Penzberg. 1987: Scrapped. | |
| V 200 044; 220 044-2 | KM 18288 | 7 February 1957 | 15 May 1980 | 12.1981: Scrapped at AW Trier | |
| V 200 045; 220 045-9 | KM 18289 | 2 February 1957 | 21 June 1982 | 12 May 1985: Sold to FP, Italy. 2003: Transferred to FER, Italy. 2005: Re-furbished & re-engined (CAT). | Thumb |
| V 200 046; 220 046-7 | KM 18290 | 14 February 1957 | 1 April 1978 | 1978: Sold to Heitkamp, exported to Saudi Arabia. Re-numbered "Heitkamp 4"; 28 October 1979 sold to Archirodon, Saudi Arabia. Re-numbered 276-02. 2002: Scrapped. | |
| V 200 047; 220 047-5 | KM 18291 | 22 February 1957 | 23 August 1980 | 03.1983: Scrapped at AW Nürnberg. | |
| V 200 048; 220 048-3 | KM 18292 | 11 March 1957 | 5 February 1984 | 10.1984: Sold to U+P Baugeräte Vermietungs GmbH, Austria. 1986: Overhauled by Regentalbahn AG, Germany. 27 July 1987: Delivered to Algeria for use on a track relaying contract. Stored at Constantine depot. | |
| V 200 049; 220 049-1 | KM 18293 | 27 March 1957 | 22 August 1978 | 12 May 1982: Sold to FSF, Italy. 2002: Re-furbished & re-engined (CAT). 2003: Transferred to FER, Italy. | |
| V 200 050; 220 050-4 | KM 18294 | 3 April 1957 | 19 May 1982 | 16 January 1985: Sold to Layritz, Penzberg. 1986: Scrapped. Starred in the 1967 three-part mini TV-series Der Postzug-berfall, which was released in the UK as a single film entitled 'The Great British Train Robbery'. | |
| V 200 051; 220 051-7 | KM 18295 | 15 April 1957 | 5 February 1984 | 03.1989: Sold to Jelka; 1990: Sold to FNM, Italy. Transferred to FSF, Italy. 2003: Transferred to FER, Italy. 2003: Re-furbished & re-engined (CAT). | |
| V 200 052; 220 052-5 | KM 18296 | 2 May 1957 | 12 February 1979 | 10.1979: Scrapped at AW Nürnberg. | |
| V 200 053; 220 053-3 | KM 18297 | 30 June 1957 | 28 October 1982 | 26 November 1986: Sold to SBB, Overhauled by Regentalbahn AG. Re-numbered Am 4/4 18466. 30 November 1996: Withdrawn from SBB service. 1997: Sold to GES, Germany. 1999: Sold to EVB, Germany. Re-numbered "V 288", then "417 01". Refurbished & re-engined (CAT) by Gmeinder. 12.2006: Sold to Brohltal-Eisenbahn GmbH, re-numbered "D9". | |
| V 200 054; 220 054-1 | KM 18298 | 30 June 1957 | 16 August 1977 | 2 August 1977: Sold to Heitkamp, exported to Saudi Arabia. Re-numbered "Heitkamp 2"; 21 October 1978: Damaged beyond repair in a collision at Riad. 28 October 1979 sold to Archirodon, Saudi Arabia, used for spares. | |
| V 200 055; 220 055-8 | KM 18299 | 19 July 1957 | 28 October 1982 | 16 January 1985: Sold to Layritz, Penzberg. 1986: Scrapped. | |
| V 200 056; 220 056-6 | KM 18565 | 10 April 1959 | 21 December 1979 | 03.1982: Scrapped at AW Trier. | |
| V 200 057; 220 057-4 | KM 18566 | 11 February 1959 | 24 November 1977 | 11.1977: Damaged beyond repair by engine room fire. 06.1978: Scrapped at AW Nürnberg | |
| V 200 058; 220 058-2 | KM 18567 | 11 March 1959 | 5 February 1984 | 1 August 1985: Sold to Zink, Luitpoldhütte. 1990: Cosmetically restored by Regentalbahn AG. 1991: Static display at Technikmuseum Speyer. | |
| V 200 059; 220 059-0 | KM 18568 | 14 March 1959 | 20 July 1979 | 03.1983: Scrapped at AW Nürnberg. | |
| V 200 060; 220 060-8 | KM 18569 | 27 February 1959 | 22 April 1983 | 1 August 1985: Sold to Zink, Luitpoldhütte. 1986: Overhauled by Regentalbahn AG; 1986: Sold to Valditerra, Italy (track maintenance contractor). 1999: Transferred to LAFESD, Italy. 2003: Sold to FER, Italy. 2003: Re-furbished & re-engined (CAT). | |
| V 200 061; 220 061-6 | KM 18570 | 4 March 1959 | 7 August 1982 | 16 January 1985: Sold to Layritz, Penzberg. 1986: Scrapped. | |
| V 200 062; 220 062-4 | KM 18571 | 17 March 1959 | 1 August 1984 | 16 January 1985: Sold to Layritz, Penzberg. 1986: Scrapped. | |
| V 200 063; 220 063-2 | KM 18572 | 23 March 1959 | 1 March 1984 | 4 July 1984: Sold to Layritz, Penzberg. 08.1984: Scrapped. | |
| V 200 064; 220 064-0 | KM 18573 | 1 April 1959 | 4 December 1979 | 03.1982: Scrapped at AW Trier | |
| V 200 065; 220 065-7 | KM 18574 | 26 March 1959 | 1 August 1984 | 9 November 1984: Sold to Layritz, Penzberg; 1 July 1985: Sold to IPE, Italy. 1987: Scrapped. | |
| V 200 066; 220 066-5 | KM 18575 | 26 March 1959 | 12 June 1978 | 01.1986: Scrapped by Deumu, Nürnberg | |
| V 200 067; 220 067-3 | KM 18576 | 22 April 1959 | 1 November 1978 | 01.1986: Scrapped by Deumu, Nürnberg | |
| V 200 068; 220 068-1 | KM 18577 | 23 April 1959 | 1 August 1984 | 21 August 1985: Sold to Glaser, München. Re-numbered V2201. 03.1987: Sold to Dehe-Cogifer, France, for use in Algeria. Re-numbered "V2201 0681"; 1991: Returned to France for LGV construction work. Re-numbered "52013". 1998: Scrapped. | |
| V 200 069; 220 069-9 | KM 18578 | 28 April 1959 | 2 February 1979 | 11 January 1978:Sold to Heitkamp, exported to Saudi Arabia. Re-numbered "Heitkamp 5"; 28 October 1979 sold to Archirodon, Saudi Arabia, re-numbered 276-03. Believed to have been destroyed by fire and scrapped by 2002. | |
| V 200 070; 220 070-7 | KM 18579 | 13 May 1959 | 4 June 1980 | 01.1981: Scrapped at AW Trier. | |
| V 200 071; 220 071-5 | KM 18580 | 11 May 1959 | 5 February 1984 | 1 August 1985: Sold to Zink, Luitpoldhütte. 1990: Cosmetically restored by Regentalbahn AG. 1991: Static display at Technikmuseum Speyer. | |
| V 200 072; 220 072-3 | KM 18581 | 21 May 1959 | 23 May 1979 | 03.1982: Scrapped at AW Trier. | |
| V 200 073; 220 073-1 | KM 18582 | 21 May 1959 | 21 November 1978 | 05.1982: Scrapped at AW Trier. | |
| V 200 074; 220 074-9 | KM 18583 | 27 May 1959 | 20 August 1982 | 12 May 1984: Sold to FP, Italy. 2003: Transferred to FER, Italy. 2004: Re-furbished & re-engined (CAT). | Thumb |
| V 200 075; 220 075-6 | KM 18584 | 4 June 1959 | 1 August 1984 | 21 August 1985: Sold to Glaser, München. Re-numbered V2202. 03.1987: Sold to Dehe-Cogifer, France, for use in Algeria. Re-numbered "V2202 0756"; 1991: Returned to France for LGV construction work. Re-numbered "52011". 1999: Scrapped. | |
| V 200 076; 220 076-4 | KM 18585 | 12 June 1959 | 25 November 1982 | 01.1986: Scrapped by Deumu, Nürnberg | |
| V 200 077; 220 077-2 | KM 18586 | 12 June 1959 | 12 September 1980 | 26 November 1986: Sold to SBB, Overhauled by Regentalbahn AG. Re-numbered Am 4/4 18467. 30 November 1996: Withdrawn from SBB service. 1997: Sold to HSVG, Berlin Seddin. 2000: Sold to Classic Train Tours AG, Düsseldorf. Being restored to operational condition by WLH Reuschling. | |
| V 200 078; 220 078-0 | KM 18587 | 23 June 1959 | 22 May 1980 | 11.1981: Scrapped at AW Trier. | |
| V 200 079; 220 079-8 | KM 18588 | 2 July 1959 | 20 August 1980 | 16 January 1985: Sold to Layritz, Penzberg. 1986: Scrapped. | |
| V 200 080; 220 080-6 | KM 18589 | 8 July 1959 | 1 April 1980 | 03.1982: Scrapped AW Trier. | |
| V 200 081; 220 081-4 | KM 18590 | 14 July 1959 | 1 April 1980 | 04.1982: Scrapped at AW Trier. | |
| V 200 082; 220 082-2 | KM 18591 | 18 July 1959 | 17 July 1980 | 1981: Scrapped AW Trier. | |
| V 200 083; 220 083-0 | KM 18592 | 24 July 1959 | 25 September 1980 | 04.1986: Scrapped by Deumu, Nürnberg. | |
| V 200 084; 220 084-8 | KM 18593 | 4 August 1959 | 9 October 1980 | 02.1986: Scrapped by Deumu, Nürnberg. | |
| V 200 085; 220 085-5 | KM 18594 | 7 August 1959 | 3 April 1980 | 04.1982: Scrapped at AW Trier | |
| V 200 086; 220 086-3 | KM 18595 | 20 August 1959 | 15 June 1973 | 21 May 1973: Damaged beyond repair in collision. 1974: Scrapped at AW Nürnberg. | |
