= Shivakiar Ibrahim =

Egyptian princess and consort (1876–1947)

Shivakiar Ibrahim شويكار إبراهيم
- Born: 25 October 1876; Üsküdar (formerly Scutari), Istanbul, Ottoman Empire
- Died: 17 February 1947 (aged 70); Kasr al-Aali Palace, Cairo, Kingdom of Egypt
- Burial: Hosh al-Basha, Imam al-Shafi'i, Cairo, Egypt
- Spouse: Fuad I of Egypt (m. 1895; div. 1898) Raouf Thabet Bey (m. 1900; div. 1903) Seyfullah Yousri Pasha (m. 1904; div. 1916) Selim Khalil Bey (m. 1917; div. 1925) Ilhami Hüseyin Pasha (m. 1927)
- Issue: From first husband: Prince Ismail; Princess Fawkia; From third husband: Wahid Yousri Bey; Lutfia Hanim; From fourth husband: Muhammad Wahideldin Selim
Names
- Arabic: شويكار إبراهيم; Turkish: Şivekâr İbrahim
- House: Muhammad Ali
- Father: Prince Ibrahim Fahmi Pasha
- Mother: Nevjiwan Hanim
- Religion: Sunni Islam

Shivakiar Ibrahim (Arabic: شويكار إبراهيم; Turkish: Şivekâr İbrahim; 25 October 1876 – 17 February 1947) was an Egyptian princess and a member of the Muhammad Ali dynasty. She was the first wife of King Fuad I.

== Early life ==
Princess Shivakiar Ibrahim was born on 25 October 1876 in Üsküdar (formerly Scutari), Istanbul. She was the only daughter of Prince Ibrahim Fahmi Pasha (1847 – 1893), and his first wife, Nevjiwan Hanim (1857 – 1940). She was the granddaughter of Prince Ahmad Rifaat Pasha (1825 – 1858) and Shams Hanim (died 1891). Shivakiar had two brothers, Prince Ahmad Saif ud-din Ibrahim (1881 – 1937), and Prince Muhammad Wahid ud-din Ibrahim. Her aunt Princess Ayn al-Hayat Ahmad was the first wife of Sultan Hussein Kamel.

== Marriages ==
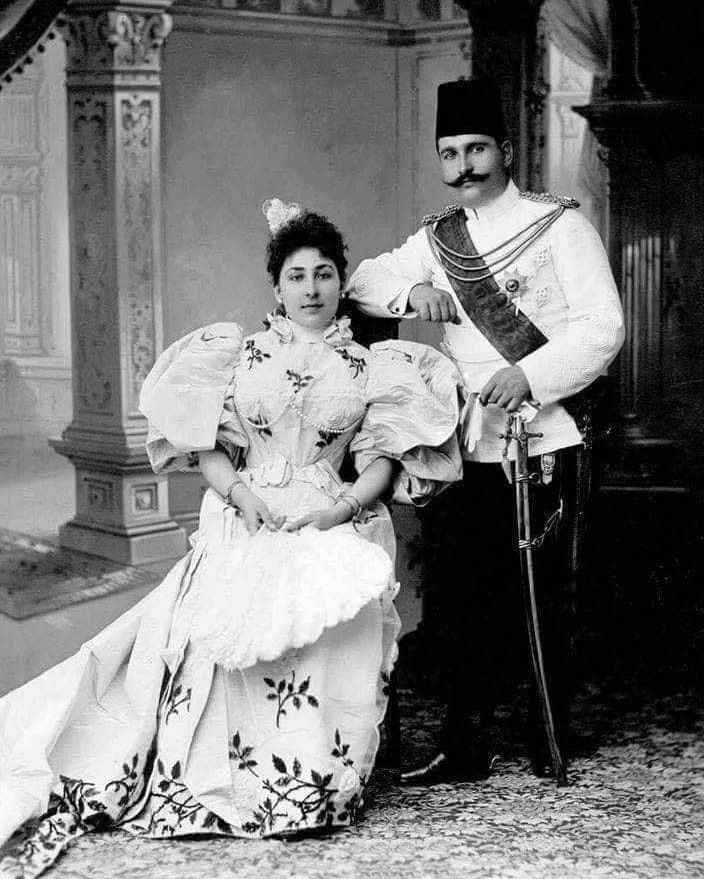
Shivakiar with her first husband, Prince Ahmed Fuad (later King Fuad)

Princess Shivakiar first married her first cousin once removed Prince Ahmed Fuad (first cousin of her father), who later became the King of Egypt, on 30 May 1895 at the Abbasiya Palace. Fuad and Shivakiar had been no match whatsoever to each other, because at the time of their marriage, Shivakiar was one of the richest women in Egypt, while Prince Fuad's gambling debts had almost bankrupted him. She was mother of a son, Ismail, born in Naples in 1896, and died in infancy at Alexandria on 6 July 1897, and a daughter, Fawkia Hanim, born on 6 October 1897 in the Saffron Palace.

Prince Fuad was deeply attached to his wife, but in May 1898, three years after their marriage the princess obliged him to divorce her and embarked on the series of matrimonial ventures which resulted in her having four successive husbands and three divorces. The divorce was a result of a dispute of her brother, Prince Ahmad Saif ud-din with Fuad, after which her brother shot Fuad in the throat. He survived, but carried that scar the rest of his life. She then went on to marry four times and had numerous affairs.

Shivakiar's second husband was Raouf Thabet Bey. She married him on 14 March 1900, and divorced him three years later in 1903. She then married Seyfullah Yousri Pasha on 2 January 1904. He was the first Egyptian ambassador to Washington, D.C., and had been married to Mahmoud Sami el-Baroudi's daughter, Samira Hanim, and with whom he had a daughter Sarwat Hanim, who married Prince Amr Ibrahim.

With Seyfullah, Shivakiar had a daughter, Lutfia Hanim, born in 1905, and a son, Wahid Yousri Bey. Shivakiar divorced him on 10 January 1916, after which he married Princess Zainab Hanim, the daughter of Prince Ibrahim Hilmy, Fuad's elder brother, and had two daughters, Nimet Hanim and Nevine Hanim.

Shivakiar married her fourth husband Selim Khalil Bey on 5 July 1917. He was the son of Halil Pasha, one of the most prominent Turkish painters and was sixteen years her junior. With him, she had a son, Muhammad Wahideldin Selim. Shivakiar divorced him on 2 March 1925, and married her last husband, Ilhami Hüseyin Pasha (1899–1992), son of Hafız Hüseyin Pasha and Gülnev Hanım in 1927. He was an employee of a bank in Istanbul. She took him back to Egypt, where she managed to take the title of pasha for him from King Fuad.

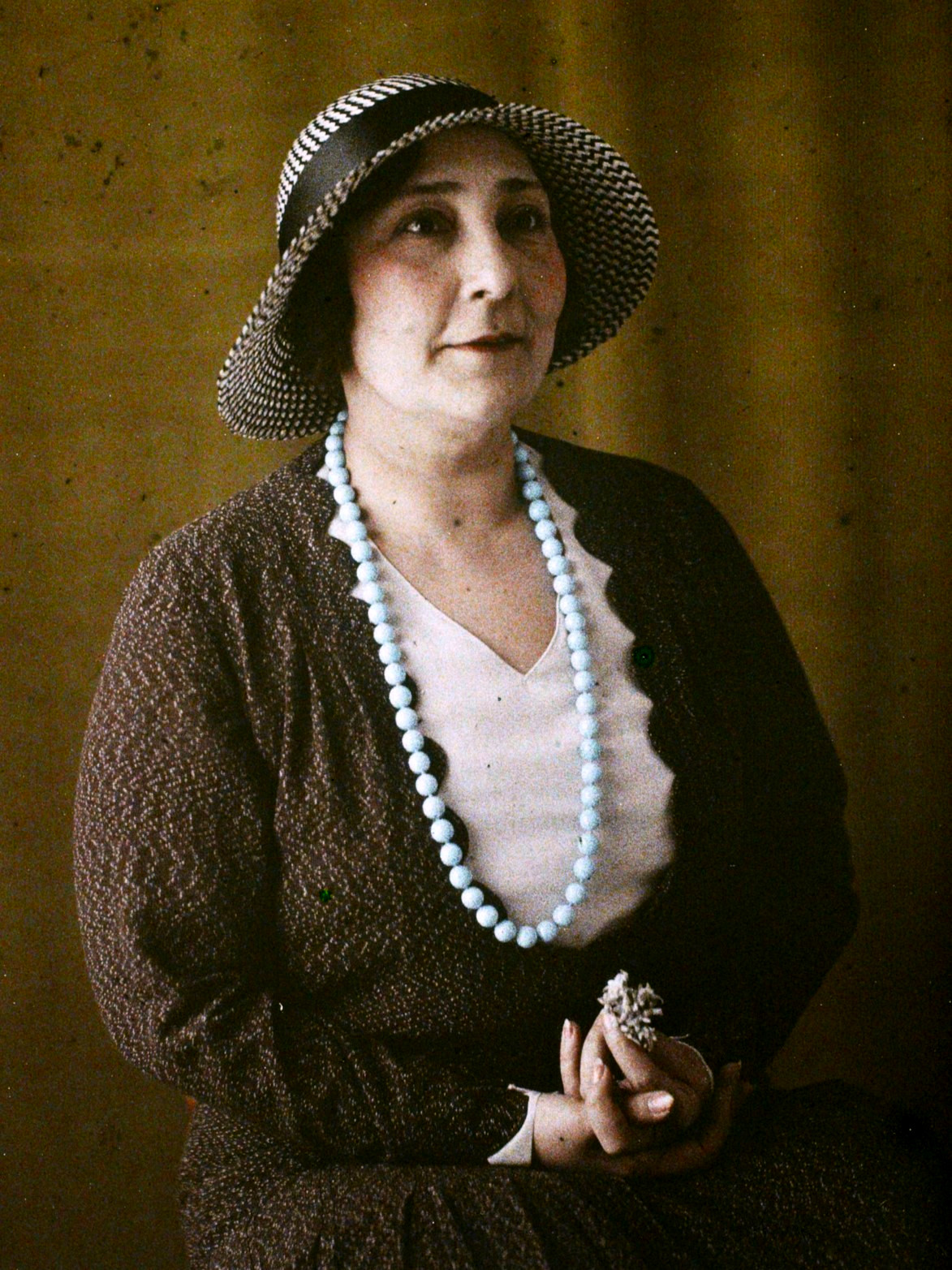
Autochrome by Georges Chevalier, 1931

Her elder daughter, Princess Fawkia Hanim married Mahmoud Fakhry Pasha on 12 May 1919. She died in 1974. Her younger daughter, Lutfia Hanim's husband was Ahmed Hassanein, an Egyptian courtier, diplomat, politician, and geographic explorer. Hassanein was the tutor, Chief of the Diwan and Chamberlain to King Farouk. The two married in 1926, and had two sons. The marriage, however, ended in divorce.

== Last years and death ==
Shivakiar kept her position in the palace protocol even after the advent of King Farouk in 1936. She remained close to the young king and maintained her title of Princess until she died. Towards the end of her life she devoted herself to the furtherance of social welfare and, as the president of the Muhammad Ali Benevolent Society, and of the ‘Mar’al-Guedida’ (New Woman), a society which trained young girls for various professions, notably nursing and dress-making, rendered great service to her country.

During her last years she was renowned both for the splendour of her entertainments and for her unfailing charity. She was also the author of Mon pays: la renovation de l'Egypte, Mohammed Aly which was published in 1933, and The Pharaoh Ne-Ouser-Ra and His Little Slave Girl. Princess Shivakiar used to live close to Prince Yusuf Kemal's palace, in a spacious villa which he had lent to her. When she inherited from her brother Prince Ahmad Saif ud-din, she went to live in a palace opposite parliament which had been built by Ali Pasha Gelal, son of Princess Zubeida and Menelikli Pasha. Princess Shivakiar, also had a "gallery of ancestors" at her Cairo palace, where she housed busts of all the viceroys down to a huge statue of King Farouk, the penultimate ruler of the Muhammad Ali dynasty.

She died at the Kasr al-Aali Palace, Cairo, on 17 February 1947 and was buried in Hosh al-Basha, Imam al-Shafi'i, Cairo, Egypt. Her tomb, in accordance with her will, was made of marble in the shape of a large, untidy bed. After her death her youngest son, Muhammad Wahideldin Selim, asked Prince Yusuf Kemal to allow him to buy the princess's original villa, and the prince agreed. He then proceed to make the palace more palatial, installing, among other things, a splendid, aubergine marble staircase. The garden was transformed, along completely formal lines, very pleasantly and successively.

== Ancestry ==
Ancestors of Shivakiar Ibrahim

16. Muhammad Ali Pasha
8. Ibrahim Pasha
17. Amina Hanim
4. Prince Ahmad Rifaat Pasha
9. Shivakiar Qadin
2. Prince Ibrahim Fahmi Pasha
5. Shams Hanim
1. Shivakiar Ibrahim
3. Nevjiwan Hanim
