= Dolder Grand =

Hotel in Zurich, Switzerland

Coordinates: 47.3728°N 8.5732°E

The Dolder Grand in 2021

The Dolder Grand (formerly known as Grand Hotel Dolder) is a luxury hotel in the Swiss city of Zurich. It is located on Adlisberg hill, some 2 kilometres (1.2 mi) from, and 200 metres (660 ft) above, the city centre. Built in 1899, the hotel spreads out over 40,000 square metres (430,000 sq ft) and offers 175 rooms and suites, two restaurants, a bar, 13 conference rooms and a 4,000-square-metre (43,000 sq ft) spa.

The hotel is connected to central Zurich by road, and by the Dolderbahn rack railway, which has its upper terminus next to the hotel complex.

== History ==
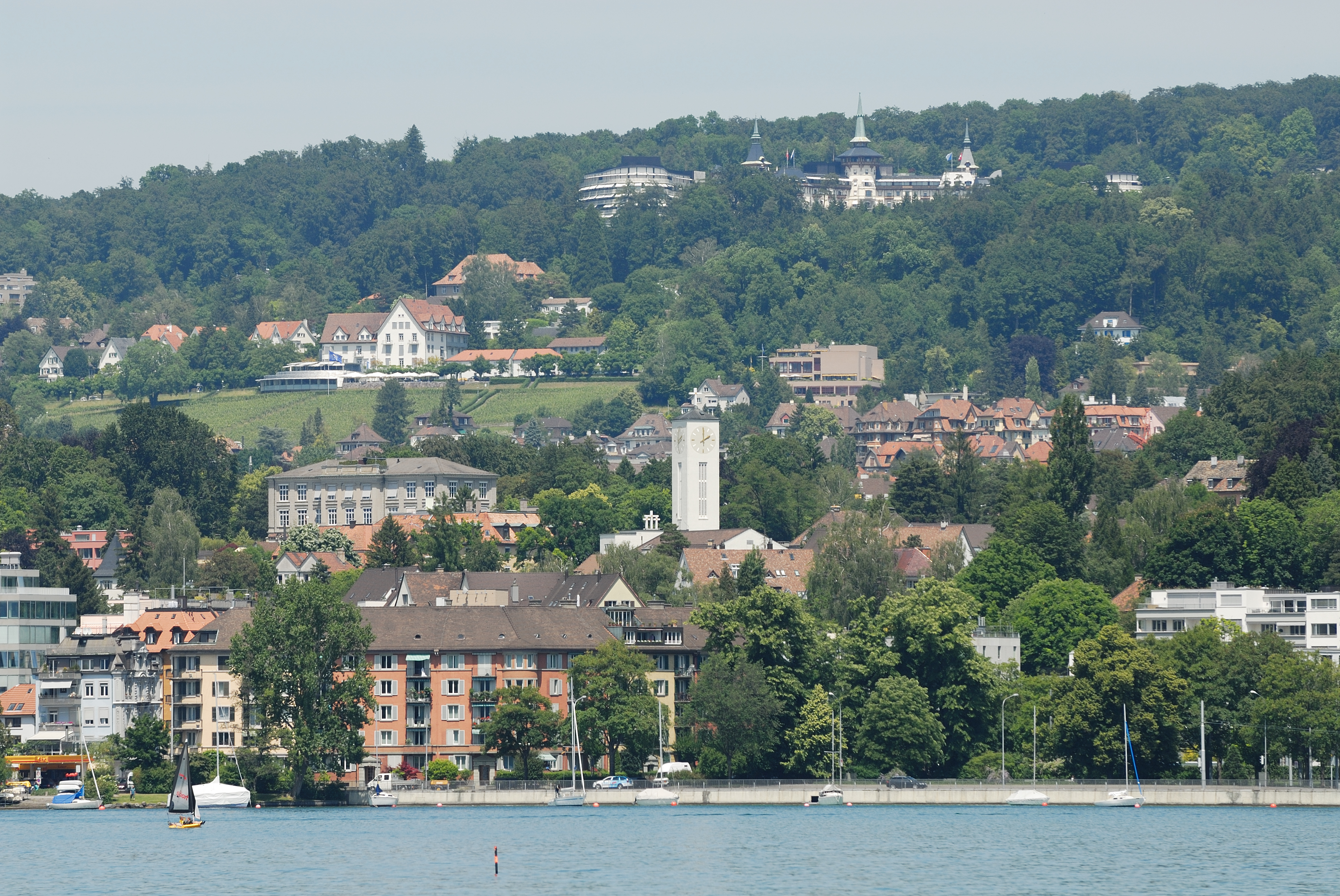
The hotel seen from Lake Zurich

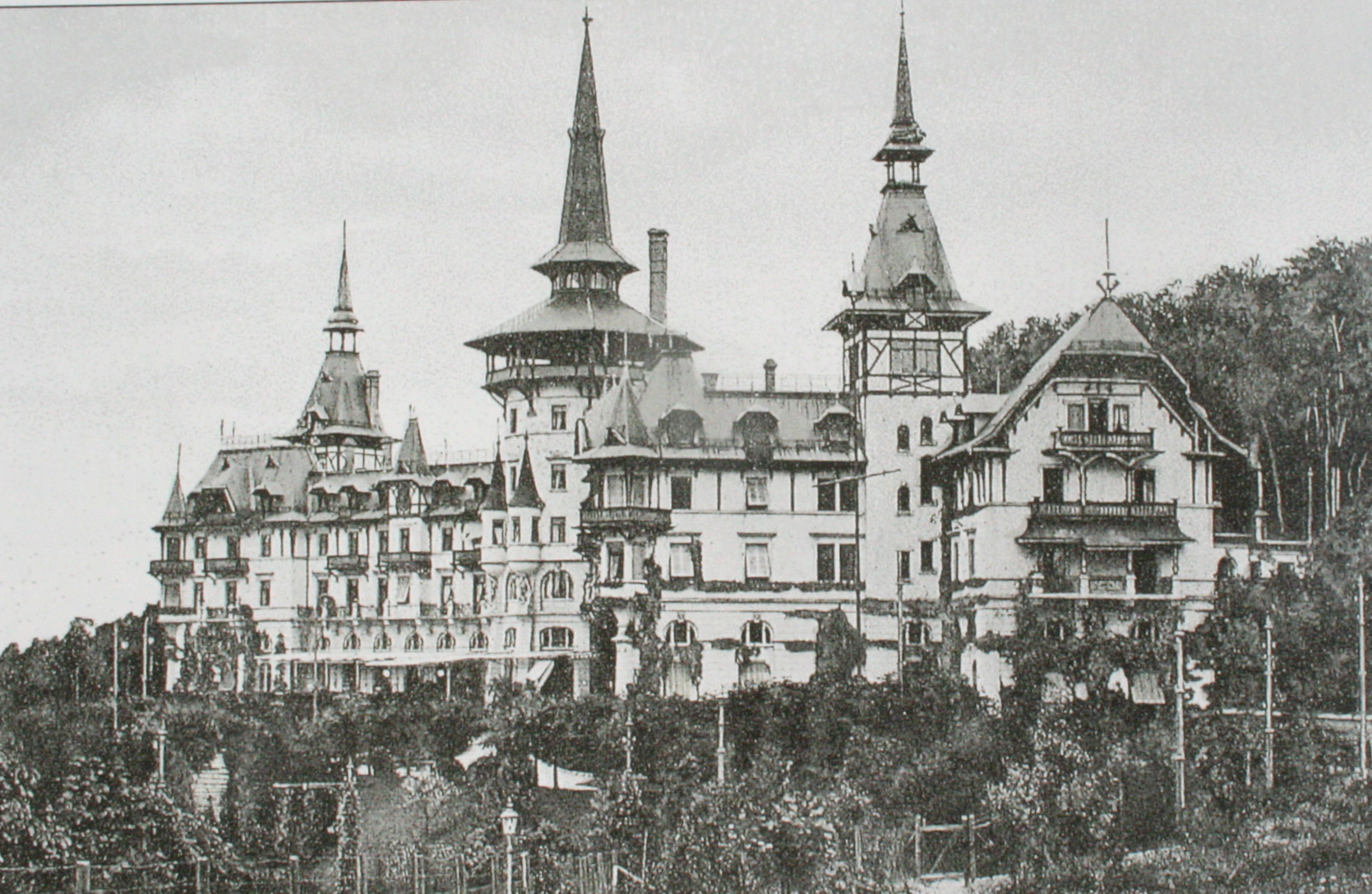
The hotel in 1905

The Dolder Grand Hotel & Curhaus was built between 1897 and 1899, to a design by the architect Jacques Gros from Basel for the restaurateur Heinrich Hürlimann. Hürlimann had previously developed the nearby Dolder Waldhaus hotel, also designed by Gros, and the Dolderbahn to serve it. The Dolder Grand opened on 10 May 1899, and was extended in 1924 and 1964.

In 2001, Urs Schwarzenbach became the majority shareholder, and in 2004 the hotel closed for an extensive renovation, reopening on 3 April 2008. The renovation was led by Norman Foster and cost SFr 440 million. The restoration maintained the original appearance from 1899, and demolished all extensions that had been made after 1899. Two new wings were added, adjacent to the old building, whilst two additional floors were added below the existing building.

The Dolder Grand began accepting bitcoin as a form of payment in May 2019, making it the first Swiss luxury hotel to accept the cryptocurrency as payment.

== See also ==
- List of hotels in Switzerland
- Tourism in Switzerland
