= Sultanic Highness =

His Sultanic Highness (HSH) (French: Son Altesse Sultanica (SAS)) was an honorific of the Sultan of Egypt.

== History ==
In 1914, as a result of the declaration of war against the Ottoman Empire (of which Egypt was nominally a part), the United Kingdom declared a protectorate over the territory. The British deposed the Egyptian Khedive (Egypt's ruler's title before His Sultanic Highness), replacing him with a family member who was made Sultan of Egypt.

With the Egyptian Revolution of 1919, the departure of the British from Egypt, and the proclamation of the Kingdom of Egypt in 1922, the country was recognized by the United Kingdom as a sovereign nation. Sultan Fuad I (His Sultanic Highness) was made king of Egypt, with the style of Majesty, and his descendants became Their Royal Highnesses, the princes and princesses of Egypt.

== See also ==
- Sultan
- His Highness
