= History of Egypt under the Muhammad Ali dynasty =

Later period of Ottoman Egypt

The history of Egypt under the Muhammad Ali dynasty (1805–1953) spanned the later period of Ottoman Egypt, the Khedivate of Egypt under British occupation, and the nominally independent Sultanate of Egypt and Kingdom of Egypt, ending with the Revolution of 1952 and the formation of the Republic of Egypt.

== Muhammad Ali's rise to power ==
The process of Muhammad Ali's seizure of power was a long three way civil war between the Ottoman Turks, Egyptian Mamluks, and Albanian mercenaries along with Egyptians loyal to Muhammad Ali. It lasted from 1803 to 1807 with the Muhammad Ali Pasha taking control of Egypt in 1805, when the Ottoman Sultan acknowledged his position. Thereafter, Muhammad Ali was the undisputed ruler of Egypt, and his efforts thenceforth were directed primarily to the maintenance of his practical independence.

== Egypt under Muhammad Ali ==
=== Campaign against the Saudis ===
The Ottoman-Saudi war in 1811–18 was fought between Egypt under the reign of Muhammad Ali (nominally under Ottoman rule) and the Wahabbis of Najd who had conquered Hejaz from the Ottomans.

When Wahabis captured Mecca in 1802, the Ottoman sultan ordered Muhammad Ali of Egypt to start moving against Wahabbis to re-conquer Mecca and return the honour of the Ottoman Empire.

==== First Arabian campaign ====
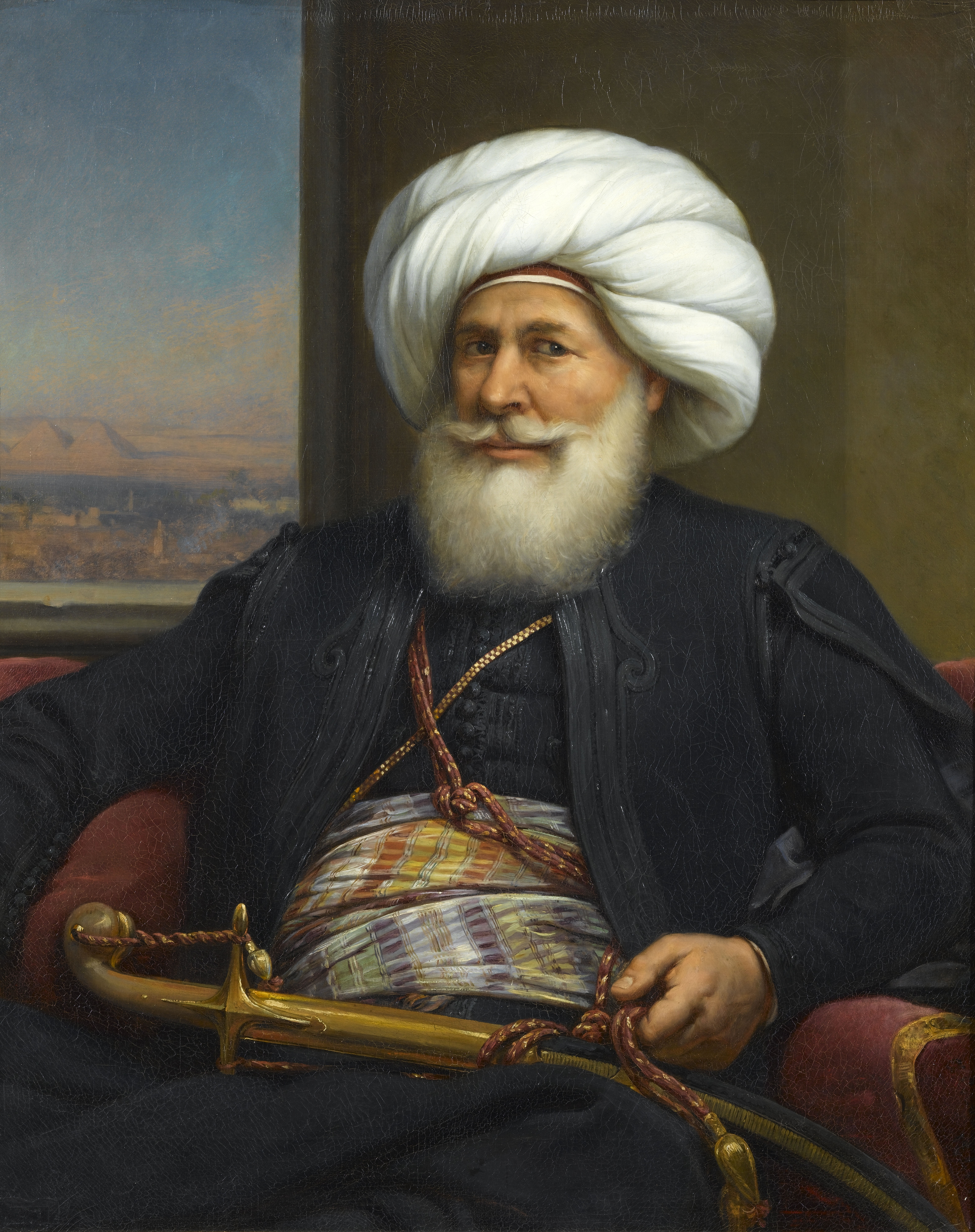
Muhammad Ali Pasha

Acknowledging the sovereignty of the Ottoman Sultan, and at the commands of the Ottoman Porte, in 1811 Muhammad Ali dispatched an army of 20,000 men (and 2,000 horses) under the command of his son Tusun, a youth of sixteen, against the Saudis in the Ottoman–Saudi War. After a successful advance this force met with a serious repulse at the Battle of Al-Safra, and retreated to Yanbu. In the end of the year Tusun, having received reinforcements, again assumed the offensive and captured Medina after a prolonged siege. He next took Jeddah and Mecca, defeating the Saudi beyond the latter and capturing their general.

But some mishaps followed, and Muhammad Ali, who had determined to conduct the war in person, left Egypt in the summer of 1813—leaving his other son Ibrahim in charge of the country. He encountered serious obstacles in Arabia, predominantly stemming from the nature of the country and the harassing mode of warfare adopted by his adversaries, but on the whole his forces proved superior to those of the enemy. He deposed and exiled the Sharif of Mecca and after the death of the Saudi leader Saud he concluded a treaty with Saud's son and successor, Abdullah I in 1815.

Following reports that the Turks, whose cause he was upholding in Arabia, were treacherously planning an invasion of Egypt, and hearing of the escape of Napoleon from Elba and fearing danger to Egypt from France or Britain, Muhammad Ali returned to Cairo by way of Kosseir and Kena, reaching the capital on the day of the Battle of Waterloo.

==== Second Arabian campaign ====
Tusun returned to Egypt on hearing of the military revolt at Cairo, but died in 1816 at the early age of twenty. Muhammad Ali, dissatisfied with the treaty concluded with the Saudis, and with the non-fulfillment of certain of its clauses, determined to send another army to Arabia, and to include in it the soldiers who had recently proved unruly.

This expedition, under his eldest son Ibrahim Pasha, left in the autumn of 1816. The war was long and arduous but in 1818 Ibrahim captured the Saudi capital of Diriyah. Abdullah I, their chief, was made prisoner and with his treasurer and secretary was sent to Istanbul (in some references he was sent to Cairo), where, in spite of Ibrahim's promise of safety and of Muhammad Ali's intercession in their favor, they were put to death. At the close of the year 1819 Ibrahim returned having subdued all opposition in Arabia.

=== Reforms ===
Forced conscription of Egyptians (1820-1823)

While the process had begun in 1808, Muhammad Ali's representative at Cairo had completed the confiscation of almost all the lands belonging to private individuals, while he was absent in Arabia (1813–15). The former owners were forced to accept inadequate pensions instead. By this revolutionary method of land nationalization Muhammad Ali became proprietor of nearly all the soil of Egypt.

During Ibrahim's engagement in the second Arabian campaign, the pasha turned his attention to further strengthening the Egyptian economy and his control over it. He created state monopolies for the chief products of the country as well as a number of factories. In 1819 he began digging the new Mahmoudiyah Canal to Alexandria, named after the reigning Sultan of Turkey. The old canal had long fallen into decay, and the necessity of providing a safe channel between Alexandria and the Nile was much felt. The conclusion of the commercial Treaty of Balta Liman in 1838 between Turkey and Britain, negotiated by Sir Henry Bulwer (Lord Dalling), struck the death knell to the system of monopolies, though its application regarding Egypt was delayed for some years, and finally included foreign intervention.

Another notable addition to the economic progress of the country was the development of cotton cultivation in the Nile Delta starting in 1822. The cotton seed for the new crop had been brought from the Sudan by Maho Bey, and with the organization of the new irrigation and industry, Muhammad Ali was able to extract considerable revenue in a few years time.

Other domestic efforts were made to promote education and the study of medicine. Muhammad Ali showed favor to European merchants as he relied on them to sell his monopoly's exports. And under his influence the port of Alexandria rose in importance again. It was also under Muhammad Ali's encouragement that the overland transit of goods from Europe to India via Egypt was resumed.

The Pasha also attempted to reorganize his troops along European lines, but this led to a formidable mutiny in Cairo. Muhammad Ali's life was endangered, and he sought refuge by night in the citadel, while the soldiers committed many acts of plunder. The effects of the revolt were reduced by gifts to the insurgent's leaders; Muhammad Ali also ordered that those who suffered from the disturbances should receive compensation from the state treasury. The conscription portion of the Nizam-ı Cedid (New System) was temporarily abandoned, as consequence of this mutiny.

==== Economy ====
Egypt under Muhammad Ali in the early 19th century had the fifth most productive cotton industry in the world, in terms of the number of spindles per capita. The industry was initially driven by machinery that relied on traditional energy sources, such as animal power, water wheels, and windmills, which were also the principle energy sources in Western Europe up until around 1870. While steam power had been experimented with in Ottoman Egypt by engineer Taqi ad-Din Muhammad ibn Ma'ruf in 1551, when he invented a steam jack driven by a rudimentary steam turbine, it was under Muhammad Ali in the early 19th century that steam engines were introduced to Egyptian industrial manufacturing. While there was a lack of coal deposits in Egypt, prospectors searched for coal deposits there, and manufactured boilers which were installed in Egyptian industries such as ironworks, textile manufacturing, paper mills and hulling mills. Coal was also imported from overseas, at similar prices to what imported coal cost in France, until the 1830s, when Egypt gained access to coal sources in Lebanon, which had a yearly coal output of 4,000 tons. Compared to Western Europe, Egypt also had superior agriculture and an efficient transport network through the Nile. Economic historian Jean Batou argues that the necessary economic conditions for rapid industrialization existed in Egypt during the 1820s–1830s, as well as for the adoption of oil as a potential energy source for its steam engines later in the 19th century.

=== Invasion of Libya and Sudan ===
In 1820 Muhammad Ali gave orders to commence the conquest of eastern Libya. He first sent an expedition westward (Feb. 1820) which conquered and annexed the Siwa oasis. Ali's intentions for Sudan was to extend his rule southward, to capture the valuable caravan trade bound for the Red Sea, and to secure the rich gold mines which he believed to exist in Sennar. He also saw in the campaign a means of getting rid of his disaffected troops, and of obtaining a sufficient number of captives to form the nucleus of the new army.

The forces destined for this service were led by Ismail, his youngest son. They consisted of between 4000 and 5000 men, being Turks and Arabs. They left Cairo in July 1820. Nubia at once submitted, the Shaigiya tribe immediately beyond the province of Dongola were defeated, the remnant of the Mamluks dispersed, and Sennar was reduced without a battle.

Mahommed Bey, the defterdar, with another force of about the same strength, was then sent by Muhammad Ali against Kordofan with like result, but not without a hard-fought engagement. In October 1822, Ismail, with his retinue, was burnt to death by Nimr, the mek (king) of Shendi; following this incident the defterdar, a man infamous for his cruelty, assumed the command of those provinces, and exacted terrible retribution from the inhabitants. Khartoum was founded at this time, and in the following years the rule of the Egyptians was greatly extended and control of the Red Sea ports of Suakin and Massawa obtained.

=== Ahmad Revolt ===
In 1824 a native rebellion broke out in Upper Egypt headed by one Ahmad, an inhabitant of al-Salimiyyah, a village situated a few miles above Thebes. He proclaimed himself a prophet, and was soon followed by between 20,000 and 30,000 insurgents, mostly peasants, but some of them deserters from the Nizam Gedid, for that force was yet in a half-organized state.

The peasants were angered by many of Ali's reforms, especially the introduction of conscription and the increase in taxes and forced labour.

The insurrection was crushed by Muhammad Ali, and about one fourth of Ahmad's followers perished, but he himself escaped and was never heard of again. Few of these unfortunates possessed any other weapon than the long staff (nabbut) of the Egyptian peasant; still they offered an obstinate resistance, and the combat in which they were defeated resembled a massacre. This movement was the last internal attempt to destroy the pasha's authority.

The subsequent years saw an imposition of order across Egypt and Ali's new highly trained and disciplined forces spread across the nation. Public order was rendered perfect; the Nile and the highways were secure to all travelers, Christian or Muslim; the Bedouin tribes were won over to peaceful pursuits.

=== Greek campaign ===
Muhammad Ali was fully conscious that the empire which he had so laboriously built up might at any time have to be defended by force of arms against his master Sultan Mahmud II, whose whole policy had been directed to curbing the power of his too ambitious vassals, and who was under the influence of the personal enemies of the pasha of Egypt, notably of Hüsrev Pasha, the Grand Vizier, who had never forgiven his humiliation in Egypt in 1803.

Mahmud also was already planning reforms borrowed from the West, and Muhammad Ali, who had plenty of opportunity of observing the superiority of European methods of warfare, was determined to anticipate the sultan in the creation of a fleet and an army on European lines, partly as a measure of precaution, partly as an instrument for the realization of yet wider schemes of ambition. Before the outbreak of the War of Greek Independence in 1821, he had already expended much time and energy in organizing a fleet and in training, under the supervision of French instructors, native officers and artificers; though it was not till 1829 that the opening of a dockyard and arsenal at Alexandria enabled him to build and equip his own vessels. By 1823, moreover, he had succeeded in carrying out the reorganization of his army on European lines, the turbulent Turkish and Albanian elements being replaced by Sudanese and fellahin. The effectiveness of the new force was demonstrated in the suppression of an 1823 revolt of the Albanians in Cairo by six disciplined Sudanese regiments; after which Mehemet Ali was no more troubled with military mutinies.

His foresight was rewarded by the invitation of the sultan to help him in the task of subduing the Greek insurgents, offering as reward the pashaliks of the Morea and of Syria. Mehemet Ali had already, in 1821, been appointed by him governor of Crete, which he had occupied with a small Egyptian force. In the autumn of 1824 a fleet of 60 Egyptian warships carrying a large force of 17,000 disciplined troops concentrated in Suda Bay, and, in the following March, with Ibrahin as commander-in-chief landed in the Morea.

His naval superiority wrested from the Greeks the command of a great deal of the sea, on which the fate of the insurrection ultimately depended, while on land the Greek irregular bands, having largely soundly beaten the Porte's troops, had finally met a worthy foe in Ibrahim's disciplined troops. The history of the events that led up to the battle of Navarino and the liberation of Greece is told elsewhere; the withdrawal of the Egyptians from the Morea was ultimately due to the action of Admiral Sir Edward Codrington, who early in August 1828 appeared before Alexandria and induced the pasha, by no means sorry to have a reasonable excuse, by a threat of bombardment, to sign a convention undertaking to recall Ibrahim and his army.

=== War with the Sultan ===
Ali went to war against the sultan on in order to obtain raw materials lacking in Egypt (especially timber for his navy) and a captive market for Egypt's new industrial output. From fall 1831 to December 1832 Ibrahim led the Egyptian army through Lebanon and Syria and across the Taurus Mountains into Anatolia where he defeated the Ottoman forces and pushed on to Kutahya, only 150 miles from Istanbul.

For the next ten years relations between the Sultan and the Pasha remained in the forefront of the questions which agitated the diplomatic world. It was not only the very existence of the Ottoman empire that seemed to be at stake, but Egypt itself had become more than ever the object of international attention, to British statesmen especially, and in the issue of the struggle were involved the interests of Britain in the two routes to India by the Isthmus of Suez and the valley of the Euphrates. Ibrahim, who once more commanded in his father's name, launched another brilliant campaign beginning with the storming of Acre on May 27, 1832, and culminating in the rout and capture of Reshid Pasha at Konya on December 21.

Soon after he was blocked by the intervention of Russia, however. As the result of endless discussions between the representatives of the powers, the Porte and the pasha, the Convention of Kütahya was signed on May 14, 1833, by which the sultan agreed to bestow on Muhammad Ali the pashaliks of Syria, Damascus, Aleppo and Itcheli, together with the district of Adana. The announcement of the pasha's appointment had already been made in the usual way in the annual firman issued on May 3. Adana was bestowed on Ibrahim under the style of muhassil, or collector of the crown revenues, a few days later.

Muhammad Ali now ruled over a virtually independent empire, stretching from the Sudan to the Taurus Mountains, subject only to a moderate annual tribute. However the unsound foundations of his authority were not long in revealing themselves. Scarcely a year from the signing of the Convention of Kutaya the application by Ibrahim of Egyptian methods of government, notably of the monopolies and conscription, had driven Syrians, Druze and Arabs, into revolt, after first welcoming him as a deliverer. The unrest was suppressed by Muhammad Ali in person, and the Syrians were terrorized, but their discontent encouraged the Sultan Mahmud to hope for revenge, and a renewal of the conflict was only staved off by the anxious efforts of the European powers.

In the spring of 1839 the sultan ordered his army, concentrated under Reshid in the border district of Bir on the Euphrates, to advance over the Syrian frontier. Ibrahim, seeing his flank menaced, attacked it at Nezib on the 24th of June. Once more the Ottomans were utterly routed. Six days later, before the news reached Constantinople, Mahmud died.

Now, with the defeat of the Ottomans and the conquest of Syria, Muhammad Ali had reached the height of his power. For one brief moment in time, he had become the envy of the Egyptian kings of antiquity, controlling Egypt, the Sudan, and Syria (which alone would have made him their better in power) he saw the Ottoman armies collapse or fall into disorganization after their defeat in Syria, and it looked like the Middle East and Anatolia were his for the taking. It looked like he could march all the way to Istanbul, in the minds of some, and place himself on the Sultan's throne.

With the Ottoman Empire at the feet of Muhammad Ali, the European powers were greatly alarmed and issued the Convention of London of 1840, designed to end the war and deal with the likely contingency of Muhammad Ali's refusal. Their intervention during the Oriental Crisis of 1840 was prompt, launching an invasion by a primarily British force (with some French and Greek elements), they made short work of Muhammad Ali's pride and joy: Egypt's modern Armed forces. However, while his army was being defeated, Muhammad saw the possibility of victory in France's unwillingness to participate (it having some warm feelings to the Khedive, and mainly participating with what was considered a token force to try to block a British expansion in North Africa.) However, in spite of France's dislike of an Egypt dominated by the British, it was equally unwilling to allow the ambitious Governor to upset the balance of power, and thus, by waiting for the hope of a better chance at victory, Muhammad Ali had to suffer a harder defeat.

However, though he had lost Syria and his position of great power, the war with the West had not been a complete disaster by any means. For though humiliated and defeated by the Western Powers, the West had no intention of removing him and the block he placed on Ottoman Power. Thus, though the peace treaty was harsh, it achieved one of Muhammad Ali's greatest dreams: to place his family firmly in the reigns of Egyptian power. Ali was unable to complete his goals of an idealized Egyptian state. Despite this, he would not attempt to overturn the Convention of London due to his advanced age.

== End of Muhammad Ali's rule ==
The end was reached early in 1841. New 'firmans' were issued which confined the pasha's authority to Egypt, including the Sinai peninsula and certain places on the Arabian side of the Red Sea, and to the Sudan. The most important of these documents is dated February 13, 1841.

The government of the pashalik of Egypt was made hereditary within the family of Muhammad Ali. A map showing the boundaries of Egypt accompanied the firman granting Muhammad Ali the pashalik, a duplicate copy being retained by the Porte. The Egyptian copy is supposed to have been lost in a fire which destroyed a great part of the Egyptian archives. The Turkish copy has never been produced and its existence now appears doubtful. The point was of importance, as in 1892 and again in 1906 boundary disputes arose between Ottoman Empire and the Egyptian Khedivate.

Various restrictions were laid upon Muhammad Ali, emphasizing his position as vassal. He was forbidden to maintain a fleet and his army was not to exceed 18,000 men. The pasha no longer a disrupting figure in European politics, but he continued to occupy himself with his improvements in Egypt. But times were not all good; the long wars combined with murrain of cattle in 1842 and a destructive Nile flood made matters worse. In 1843 there was a plague of locusts where whole villages were depopulated. Even the sequestered army was a strain enough for a population unaccustomed to the rigidities of the conscription service. Florence Nightingale, the famous British nurse, recounts in her letters from Egypt written in 1849–50, that many an Egyptian family thought it be enough to "protect" their children from the inhumanities of the military service by blinding them in one eye or rendering them unfit by cutting off their limb. But Muhammad Ali was not to be confounded by such tricks of bodily non-compliance, and with that view he set up a special corps of disabled musketeers declaring that one can shoot well enough even with one eye.

Meantime the uttermost farthing was wrung from the wretched fellahin, while they were forced to the building of magnificent public works by unpaid labor. In 1844–45 there was some improvement in the condition of the country as a result of financial reforms the pasha executed. Muhammad Ali, who had been granted the honorary rank of grand vizier in 1842, paid a visit to Istanbul in 1846, where he became reconciled to his old enemy Khosrev Pasha, whom he had not seen since he spared his life at Cairo in 1803.

In 1847 Muhammad Ali laid the foundation stone of the great bridge across the Nile at the beginning of the Delta. Towards the end of 1847, the aged pasha's previously sharp mind began to give way, and by the following June he was no longer capable of administering the government. In September 1848 Ibrahim was acknowledged by the Porte as ruler of the pashalik, but he died in the following November.

Muhammad Ali survived another eight months, dying on August 2, 1849. He had done a great work in Egypt, the most permanent being the weakening of the tie binding the country to Turkey, the starting of the great cotton industry, the recognition of the advantages of European science, and the conquest of the Sudan.

== Muhammad Ali's successors ==
On Ibrahim's death in November 1848 the government of Egypt fell to his nephew Abbas I, the son of Tusun Abbasad. Abbas put an end to the system of commercial monopolies, and during his reign the railway from Alexandria to Cairo was begun at the instigation of the British government. Opposed to European ways, Abbas lived in great seclusion. After a reign of less than six years he was murdered in July 1854 by two of his slaves.

He was succeeded by his uncle Sa'id Pasha, the favorite son of Muhammad Ali, who lacked the strength of mind or physical health needed to execute the beneficent projects which he conceived. His endeavour, for instance, to put a stop to the slave raiding which devastated the Sudan was wholly ineffectual. He had a genuine regard for the welfare of the fellahin, and a land law of 1858 secured for them an acknowledgment of freehold as against state ownership.

The pasha was much under French influence, and in 1854 was induced to grant to the French engineer Ferdinand de Lesseps a concession "to form a financial company to pierce the isthmus" and operate a canal for 99 years. Lord Palmerston was opposed to this project, and the British opposition delayed the ratification of the concession by the Porte for two years. This prompted a second concession in 1856 that obligated the Egyptian government to provide 80% of the labour for the canal's construction. Said also made concessions to the British, for the Eastern Telegraph Company, and another in 1854 allowing the establishment of the Bank of Egypt. He also began the national debt by borrowing £3,293,000 from Messrs ″Frühling & Göschen″, the actual amount received by the pasha being £2,640,000. In January 1863 Said Pasha died and was succeeded by his nephew Ismail, a son of Ibrahim Pasha.

=== Ismail the Magnificent ===
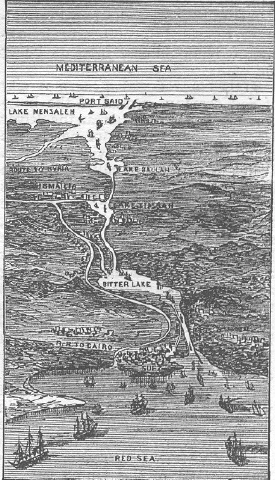
1881 drawing of the Suez Canal

The reign of Ismail, from 1863 to 1879, was initially hailed as a new era of bringing Egypt into modernity. He completed vast development schemes and attempted positive administrative reforms, but this progress, coupled with his personal extravagance led to bankruptcy. The later part of his reign is historically and nationally important simply for its result, which brought European intervention deeply into Egyptian finances and development, and led to the British occupation of Egypt shortly thereafter.

In his earlier years of reign, much was changed regarding Egypt's sovereignty, which seemed likely to give Ismail a more important place in history. In 1866 the Ottoman Sultan granted him a firman, obtained on condition that he increase his annual tribute from £376,000 to £720,000. This made the succession to the throne of Egypt descend to the eldest of the male children and in the same manner to the eldest sons of these successors, instead of to the eldest male of the family, following the practice of Turkish law. In the next year another firman bestowed upon him the title of khedive in lieu of that of vali, borne by Mehemet Ali and his immediate successors. In 1873 a further firman placed the khedive in many respects in the position of an independent sovereign.

Ismail re-established and improved Muhammad Ali's administrative system, which had fallen into decay under Abbas's uneventful rule. This included a thorough revamping of the customs system which was anarchic, and remodeled on British lines and by English officials. In 1865, he established the Egyptian post office; he reorganized the military schools of his grandfather, and gave some support to the cause of education. Railways, telegraphs, irrigation projects, lighthouses, the harbour works at Suez, and the breakwater at Alexandria, were carried out during his reign, by some of the best contractors of Europe. Most important of all, was Egypt's support for the Suez Canal, which finally opened in 1869. Not only did the government buy many shares in the venture, initially intended for British investors, it provided the corvee labour to dig the canal, as well as digging a canal to bring Nile water to the new city of Ismailia at the Suez's midpoint. When Khedive Ismail sought to terminate Egypt's corvee labour obligation, because he needed it for cotton production to take advantage of vastly inflated cotton prices, caused by the loss of American exports during its Civil War, Egypt was compelled to pay more than £3 million in compensation to the Canal Company. The funds helped pay for the elaborate dredging equipment brought in to replace the labour and needed to complete the canal.

Once that conflict ended Ismail had to find new sources of funding to keep his development and reform efforts alive. Thus the funds required for these public works, as well as the actual labor, were remorselessly extorted from a poverty-stricken population. A striking picture of the condition of the people at this period is given by Lady Duff Gordon in Last Letters from Egypt. Writing in 1867 she said: "I cannot describe the misery here now every day some new tax. Every beast, camel, cow, sheep, donkey and horse is made to pay. The fellaheen can no longer eat bread; they are living on barley-meal mixed with water, and raw green stuff, vetches, &c. The taxation makes life almost impossible: a tax on every crop, on every animal first, and again when it is sold in the market; on every man, on charcoal, on butter, on salt. . . . The people in Upper Egypt are running away by wholesale, utterly unable to pay the new taxes and do the work exacted. Even here (Cairo) the beating for the years taxes is awful."

In the late 1860s Egypt attempted to build a modern navy and ordered several armored ironclads, two each of the "Nijmi Shevket" class and the "Lutfi Djelil" class. Although intended for the Egyptian Navy, these ironclads had to be delivered to the Ottoman Navy in 1869. Egypt was able to keep a navy with a few unarmored warships including the iron steam frigate Ibrahim and a large yacht, the "Mahroussa" which survives in rebuilt form to the present day.

In the years that followed the condition of things grew worse. A public health crisis arose in Egypt. The Constantinople Board of Health reported that the plague could still be found in Egypt, within the districts of Marj and Assyr. A 21-day quarantine was imposed on the ports of El Wedj. Thousands of people died and large sums expended in extending Ismail's dominions in the Sudan and in futile conflicts with Ethiopia. Eventually, Egypt successfully annexed the region of Darfur, further expanding the state. In 1875, the impoverishment of the fellah had reached such a high point that the ordinary resources of the country no longer sufficed for the most urgent necessities of administration; and the khedive Ismail, having repeatedly broken faith with his creditors, could not raise any more loans on the European market. The taxes were habitually collected many months in advance, and the colossal floating debt was increasing rapidly. In these circumstances Ismail had to realize his remaining assets, and among them sold 176,602 Suez Canal shares to the British government for £976,582, which surrendered Egyptian control of the waterway.

These crises induced the British government to inquire more carefully into the financial condition of the country, where Europeans had invested much capital. In December 1875, Stephen Cave, MP, and Colonel (later Sir) John Stokes, RE, were sent to Egypt to inquire into Egypt's financial situation. Mr Cave's report, made public only in April 1876, showed that under the existing administration national bankruptcy was inevitable. With no alternatives, European powers used Egypt's indebtedness to extract concessions regarding how the debts would be repaid. Other commissions of inquiry followed, and each one brought Ismail increasingly under European control. The establishment of the Mixed Tribunals in 1876, in place of the system of consular jurisdiction in civil actions, made some of the courts of justice international.

The Caisse de la Dette, instituted in May 1876 as a result of the Cave mission, led to international control over a large portion of the government's revenue. In November 1876, the mission of Mr (afterwards Lord) Goschen and M. Joubert on behalf of the British and French bondholders, one result being the establishment of Dual Control, in which an English official would superintend the revenues and a French official would superintend the expenditures of the country. Another result was the international control of the railways and the port of Alexandria, to balance these items. Then, in May 1878, a commission of inquiry of which the principal members were Sir Charles Rivers Wilson, Major Evelyn Baring (afterwards Lord Cromer) and MM. Kremer-Baravelli and Monsieur de Blignières. One result of that inquiry was the extension of international control to the enormous property of the khedive himself.

Driven to desperation in September 1878, Ismail made a virtue of necessity and, in lieu of the Dual Control, accepted a constitutional ministry, under the presidency of Nubar Pasha; Rivers Wilson became minister of finance and de Blignières became minister of public works. Professing to be quite satisfied with this arrangement, he announced that Egypt was no longer in Africa but a part of Europe. Within seven months however, he found his constitutional position intolerable, got rid of his irksome cabinet by means of a secretly organized military riot in Cairo, and reverted to his old autocratic methods of government.

Britain and France, anxious about losing influence under this affront, decided to administer chastisement by the hand of the suzerain power, which was delighted to have an opportunity of asserting its authority. The Europeans and the Sublime Porte decided to force Ismail out of office. On the June 26, 1879 Ismail suddenly received from the sultan a curt telegram, addressed to him as ex-khedive of Egypt, informing him that his son Tewfik was appointed his successor. Surprised, he made no attempt at resistance, and Tewfik was at once proclaimed khedive.

== Dual control ==
After a short period of inaction, when it seemed as if the change might be for the worse, Britain and France in November 1879, re-established the Dual Control in the persons of Major Baring and Monsieur de Blignières. For two years the Dual Control governed Egypt. Discontent within various sectors of the elite and among elements of the population at large led to a reaction against European interference. Without any efficient means of self-protection and coercion at its disposal, it had to interfere with the power, privileges and perquisites of the local elite. This elite, so far as its civilian members were concerned, was not very formidable, because these were not likely to go beyond the bounds of intrigue and passive resistance; but it contained a military element who had more courage, and who had learned their power when Ismail employed them for overturning his constitutional ministry.

Among the mutinous soldiers on that occasion was an officer calling himself Ahmed Urabi. He was a charismatic leader who was followed by a group of fellow army officers and many among the lower classes. He became the centre of a protest aimed at protecting the Egyptians from their Turkish and European oppressors. The movement began among the Arab officers, who complained of the preference shown to the officers of Turkish origin; it then expanded into an attack on the privileged position and predominant influence of foreigners; finally, it was directed against all Christians, foreign and native. The government, being too weak to suppress the agitation and disorder, had to make concessions, and each concession produced fresh demands. Urabi was first promoted, then made under-secretary for war, and ultimately a member of the cabinet.

The danger of a serious rising brought the British and French fleets in May 1882 to Alexandria. Because of concerns over the safety of the Suez Canal and massive British investments in Egypt the Europeans looked to intervene. The French hesitated, however, and the British alone tried to suppress the revolt. On July 11, 1882, after widespread revolts in Alexandria, the British fleet bombarded the city. The leaders of the national movement prepared to resist further aggression by force. A conference of ambassadors was held in Constantinople, and the sultan was invited to quell the revolt; but he hesitated to employ his troops against what was far more a threat to European interests.

== Egypt occupied by the British ==
The British government decided to employ armed force, and invited France to cooperate. The French government declined, and a similar invitation to Italy met with a similar refusal. Britain therefore, acting alone, landed troops at Ismailia under Sir Garnet Wolseley, and suppressed the revolt by the battle of Tel-el-Kebir on September 13, 1882. While it had been claimed this was meant to be only a temporary intervention, British troops would remain in Egypt until 1956. The landing in Ismailia happened due to the British failure to perform the original plan to destroy defences in Alexandria, then march to Cairo.

With no fleet to protect the city, British battleships easily bombarded the city, forcing many civilians to migrate. Uraby, the Egyptian army commander, was not allowed to have troopers exceeding 800 men strong. Defeated in Alexandria, he decided to fight the British on ground he gathered the 2,200 men at Kafr-el-sheikh and constructed strong base which he held against a force of 2,600 British who were trying to advance on Cairo from the north. The battle took place between an Egyptian army, headed by Ahmed ‘Urabi, and British forces headed by Sir Archibald Alison. As a result, the British abandoned any hope they may have had of reaching Cairo from the north, and shifted their base of operations to Ismailia instead. The British forces retreating to their main base at Alexandria. The British then transported a large force of Ismailia where 13,000 of them engaged 16,000 Egyptians. They met Uraby at El-Tal El-Kebier which was weakly prepared comparing with the defence lines at Kafr- El- Shiekh to withstand heavy artillery, so the fort was taken and Uraby was exiled to India.

The khedive, who had taken refuge in Alexandria, returned to Cairo, and a ministry was formed under Sherif Pasha, with Riaz Pasha as one of its leading members. On assuming office, the first thing it had to do was to bring to trial the chiefs of the rebellion. Urabi pleaded guilty, was sentenced to death, the sentence being commuted by the khedive to banishment; and Riaz resigned in disgust. This solution of the difficulty was brought about by Lord Dufferin, then British ambassador at Istanbul, who had been sent to Egypt as high commissioner to adjust affairs and report on the situation.

One of his first acts, after preventing the application of capital punishment to the ringleaders of the revolt, was to veto the project of protecting the khedive and his government by means of a Praetorian guard recruited from Asia Minor, Epirus, Austria and Switzerland, and to insist on the principle that Egypt must be governed in a truly liberal spirit. Passing in review all the departments of the administration, he laid down the general lines on which the country was to be restored to order and prosperity, and endowed, if possible, with the elements of self-government for future use.

Egyptian Fundamental Ordinance of 1882, a constitution, followed an abortive attempt to promulgate a constitution in 1879. The document was limited in scope and was effectively more of an organic law of the Consultative Council to the khedive than an actual constitution.

== Demographic changes during the reign of Muhammad Ali and his successors ==
During this period the stagnation of the Egyptian population that had been fluctuating at about 4 million level for many centuries prior to 1805 was changed by the start of a rapid population growth. This growth was quite slow till the 1840s, but since then the Egyptian population grew up to about 7 million by the 1880s, and the first modern census registered 9,734,405 people in Egypt in 1897. This was achieved by a radical decrease in mortality rates and concomitant growth of life expectancy by 10–15 years, which, of course, indicates that Muhammad Ali and his successors in fact achieved impressive success in the effective modernization of Egypt and that the actual quality of life of the majority of the Egyptian population significantly increased in the 19th century. In Egypt in the 19th century the overall pattern of the population growth was explicitly non-Malthusian and can be characterized as hyperbolic, whereby the increase in population was accompanied not by decreases of the relative population growth rates, but by their increases.

== Rulers of the Dynasty ==
Eleven rulers spanned the 148 years of the Muhammad Ali Dynasty from 1805 to 1953.

- Muhammad Ali Dynasty family tree

== See also ==
- Category:Muhammad Ali dynasty
- History of Modern Egypt
- Al-Nahda
