= Ahmad Rifaat Pasha =

Ahmed Rifaat Pasha of the Muhammad Ali Pasha dynasty

Ahmed Rifaat Pasha
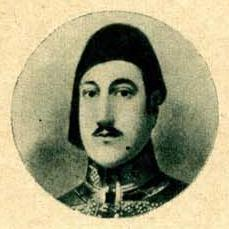
- Born: 8 December 1825; Cairo, Egypt Eyalet, Ottoman Empire
- Died: 15 May 1858 (aged 32); Kafr el-Zayyat, Egypt Eyalet, Ottoman Empire
- Burial: Hosh al-Basha Mausoleum of Imam al-Shafi'i, Cairo, Egypt
- Spouse: Shams Hanim; Azmraftar Qadin; Dilbar Jihan Qadin; Za'faran Qadin
- Issue: Ibrahim Fahmi Pasha; Ahmad Kamal Pasha; Ayn al-Hayat Ahmad
- Arabic: أحمد رفعت باشا
- Dynasty: Muhammad Ali
- Father: Ibrahim Pasha of Egypt
- Mother: Shivakiar Qadin

Ahmad Rifaat Pasha (8 December 1825 – 15 May 1858) was a member of the Muhammad Ali dynasty of Egypt. He was the son of Ibrahim Pasha of Egypt, and his consort Shivakiar Qadin.

== Death ==
He was heir presumptive to Sa'id Pasha. However, in 1858, a special train conveying Ahmad Rifaat Pasha was being carried on a car float across the Nile at Kafr el-Zayyat. The train fell off the car float into the river where the prince drowned.

Sa'id outlived Ahmad Rifaat until 1863, when he was succeeded by Ahmad Rifaat's half brother Isma'il Pasha.

== Family ==
His consorts were Shams Hanim (died 1891), known as "Princess Ahmad", mother of Ibrahim Fahmi Pasha (1847–1893), Azmraftar Qadin (died 1904), mother of Ahmad Kamal Pasha (1857–1907), Dilbar Jihan Qadin (died 1900), mother of Ayn al-Hayat Ahmad (1858–1910), and Za'faran Qadin, an Abyssinian, and mother of a son and a daughter.

His elder son Prince Ibrahim Fahmi was married to Nevjiwan Hanim. She was born in 1857. She was the mother of his sons Princes Ahmed Saif ud-din Ibrahim and Muhammad Wahid ud-din Ibrahim and his daughter Princess Shivakiar Ibrahim. She died in 1940. Another wife was Princess Zainab Hanim. She was the daughter of Khedive Isma'il Pasha and his wife Jananiyar Hanim. They married in 1874. She died a year later in 1875, and he married her younger half-sister Princess Nimetullah Hanim in 1890, Isma'il’s daughter by the concubine Neshedil Qadin. However, the marriage was not consummated.

His younger son Prince Ahmed Kamal was married to Nazparwar Hanim. She was the mother of Prince Yusuf Kamal. She died in 1925. Another wife was Princess Jamila Fadila Hanim, daughter of Isma'il Pasha and his concubine Misl Jahan Qadin. They married in 1879. His only daughter, Princess Ayn al-Hayat Ahmad was the first wife of Sultan Hussein Kamel, son of Isma'il Pasha and his concubine Nur Felek Qadin.

== Ancestry ==
Ancestors of Ahmad Rifaat Pasha

16. Othman Agha
8. Ibrahim Agha
4. Muhammad Ali Pasha
9. Zainab Hanim
2. Ibrahim Pasha
10. Nusratli Ali Agha
5. Amina Hanim
1. Ahmad Rifaat Pasha
3. Shivakiar Qadin

== See also ==
- Muhammad Ali Dynasty
- Muhammad Ali Dynasty family tree
