= Qadin =

Surname

Qadin is a name found most frequently in Pakistan and means "intelligence and confident"

Notable people with the name include:

== Surname ==
- Ayn al-Hayat Qadin (died 1849), A consort of Muhammad Ali of Egypt
- Bamba Qadin (died 1871), An Egyptian princess
- Ferial Qadin (died 1902), A consort to Ismail Pasha
- Hoshiyar Qadin (died 1886), A consort to Ibrahim Pasha
- Neshedil Qadin (1857–1924), A consort to Khedive Isma'il Pasha of Egypt consort to Ibrahim Pasha
- Nur Felek Qadin (died 1916), A consort to Ibrahim Pasha

== See also ==
- Qadian, a town and a municipal council in Gurdaspur District, north-east of Amritsar
