= Qubbat Afandina =

Tombs of the Alawi dynasty that ruled Egypt

Qubbat Afandina, the Mausoleum of Khedive Tawfiq
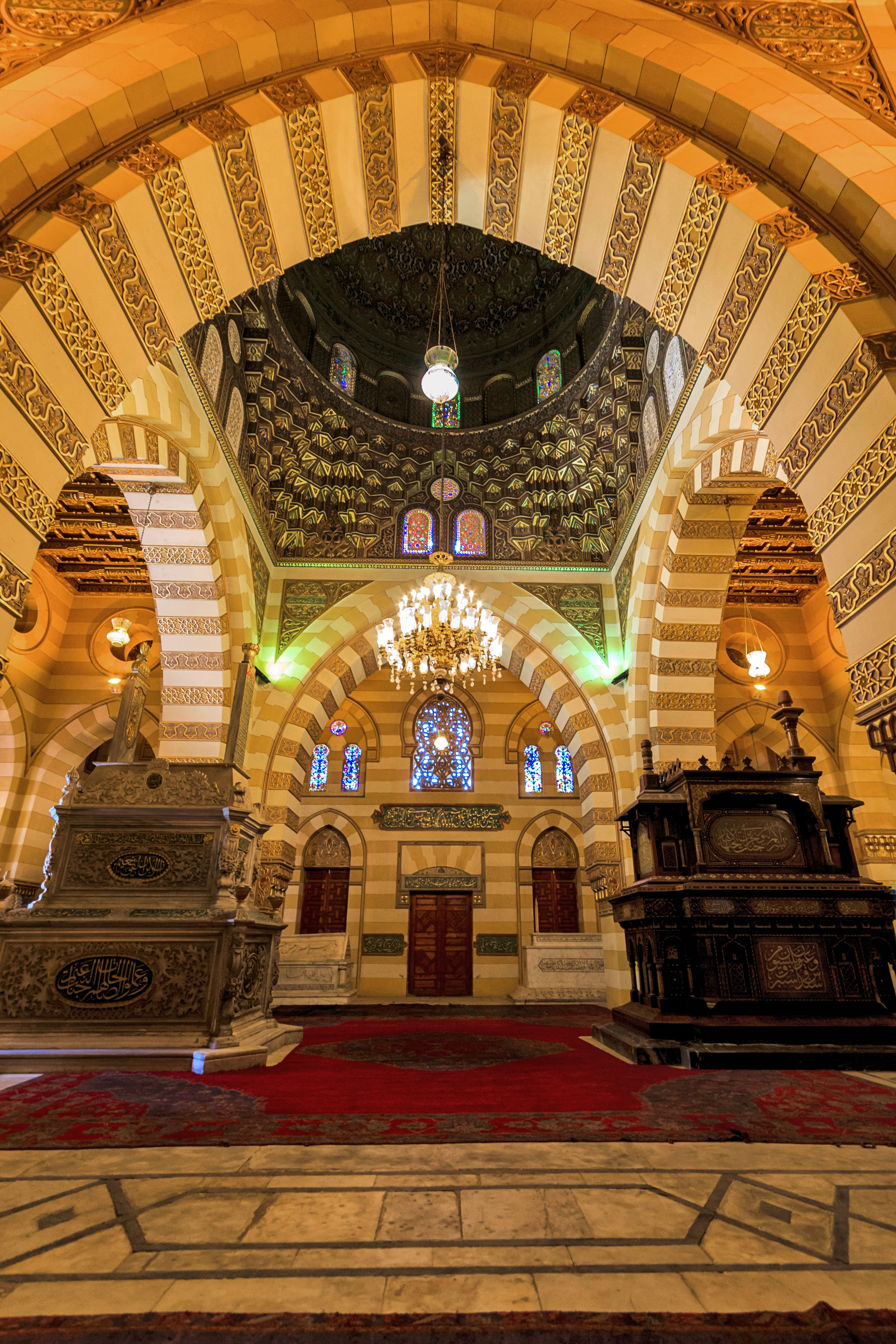
- Interactive map of Qubbat Afandina, the Mausoleum of Khedive Tawfiq
- 30.041676°N 31.274987°E
- Location: Afifi, Northern Cemetery, Cairo, Egypt

History
- Built: AD 1894 / 1311 AH
- Built for: Muhammad Ali dynasty

Site notes
- Architect: Dimitrius Fabricius
- Architectural styles: Neo-Mamluk architecture, Ottoman architecture

Qubbat Afandina (Arabic: قبة أفندينا; meaning: "the Dome of Our Sir"), the Mausoleum of Khedive Tawfiq, is a 19th-century monument located in the Afifi area on the eastern edge of the Northern Cemetery of Mamluk Necropoli of Cairo, Egypt.

== Description ==
The mausoleum was built in 1894 by the Khedive Abbas II of Egypt (1874–1944), in memory of his father Khedive Tawfiq Pasha who died in 1892. It was designed by the khedival royal court architect Dimitrius Fabricius Pasha (1847–1907), in a Neo-Mamluk architectural style.

Qubbat Afandina is the resting place of many members of the royal family of Muhammad Ali Pasha, including: Khedive Tewfiq Pasha (1852–1892), Princess Bamba Qadin(?–1871), Princess Emina Ilhamy (1858–1931), and her son Khedive Abbas II.

== See also ==
- Muhammad Ali dynasty family tree
- Mausolea

== Bibliography ==
- Mohamed Elshahed, Cairo Since 1900: An Architectural Guide, American University in Cairo Press, 2019, ISBN 9774168690, 9789774168697, 240 pages.
- Williams, Caroline, Islamic Monuments in Cairo: The Practical Guide, Cairo: American University of Cairo Press, 2008, 214 pages.
- Byrne, Aran, East-West Divan: In Memory of Werner Mark Linz, Gingko Library, London, UK, 2014.
- Richard Bordeaux Parker, Islamic Monuments in Cairo: A Practical Guide, American University in Cairo Press. 1993, 312 pages.
