= Ayn al-Hayat Ahmad =

Egyptian princess

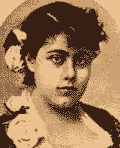
- Born: 5 October 1858; Cairo, Egypt
- Died: 12 August 1910 (aged 51); Paris, France
- Burial: Hosh al-Basha, Imam al-Shafi'i, Cairo
- Spouse: Hussein Kamel of Egypt (m. 1873, divorced)
- Issue Among others: Prince Kamal el Dine Hussein; Princess Kazima Hanim
Names
- Arabic: عين الحياة احمد; Turkish: Aynülhayat Ahmed
- House: Alawiyya
- Father: Prince Ahmad Rifaat Pasha
- Mother: Dilbar Jihan Qadin
- Religion: Sunni Islam

Ayn al-Hayat Ahmad (Arabic: عين الحياة احمد; Turkish: Aynülhayat Ahmed; 5 October 1858 – 12 August 1910; meaning "Spring of life") was an Egyptian princess and a member of the Muhammad Ali dynasty. She was the first wife of Sultan Hussein Kamel of Egypt.

== Early life ==
Princess Ayn-al-Hayat was born on 5 October 1858, and was the only daughter of Prince Ahmad Rifaat Pasha (1825 — 1858) and his consort Dilbar Jihan Qadin (died 1900). She had two elder half-brothers, Prince Ibrahim Fahmi Pasha (1847 — 1893) and Prince Ahmad Kamal Pasha (1857 — 1907). Prince Ahmad Kamal was a man greatly esteemed for his love of justice and the austerity of his life. Ayn al-Hayat, was still a child when her father met his tragic end. Dark, petite, and vivacious, she had great charm. Her uncle, the Khedive Ismail, was very fond of her and took a personal interest in her education.

== Marriage ==
In order to introduce Ayn al- Hayat to study Isma'il used to say: "If you really try to learn your lessons and all your teachers are satisfied, I shall marry you to my son Hussein." Ayn al-Hayat, as a child was so delighted with the idea that once when she was twelve she ran out to meet her uncle, who had come to see her, saying: "Today all my teachers are pleased. Now may I marry Hussein Agha bey?" The marriage took place in 1873. Prince Hussein was devoted to his wife, who at first appeared to be happy. The two together had four children of whom only two survived, a son, Prince Kamal el Dine Hussein, born on 20 December 1874, and a daughter, Princess Kazima Hanim, born on 16 July 1876. While the youngest two children, a daughter, Princess Kamila Hanim, and a son, Prince Ahmed Kazim died young. Then quite suddenly she insisted on a divorce and obtained her freedom. Princess Ayn-al-Hayat never remarried.

== Organization ==
She is remembered as a founder and first president of the Muhammad Ali Benevolent Society in 1909. The members of its community were all women, something till then unheard of in the annals of the Middle East. Medical and financial advisers were the only men consulted. The society began by opening a dispensary for women and children in the populous quarter behind the Abdeen Palace. The funds were chiefly supplied from the Princess's own resources and by donations from the Khedival family, as it then existed. According to the rules of the society, the president was always to be a princess of the ruling family.

== Death and aftermath ==
Princess Ayn al-Hayat died on 12 August 1910 at Paris, France and was buried in the mausoleum of Hosh al-Basha, Imam al-Shafi'i, Cairo. After her death, Princess Nazli Halim became the president of Muhammad Ali Benevolent Society. She was followed by Princess Fawzia, who was the president of the organization to come from the royal house.

== Issue ==
Together with Hussein Kamil, Ayn al-Hayat had four children:

- Prince Kamal el Dine Hussein (Cairo, 20 December 1874 – Toulouse, France, 6 August 1932 and buried in a mausoleum in the Muqattam Hills), married and had issue;
- Princess Kazima Hanim (16 July 1876 – Rome, 29 January 1921 and buried in ar-Rifai Mosque, Cairo), unmarried and without issue;
- Princess Kamila Hanim (died young);
- Prince Ahmed Kazim (died young);

== Ancestry ==
Ancestors of Ayn al-Hayat Ahmad

16. Ibrahim Agha
8. Muhammad Ali Pasha
17. Zainab Hanim
4. Ibrahim Pasha
18. Nusratli Ali Agha
9. Amina Hanim
2. Prince Ahmad Rifaat Pasha
5. Shivakiar Qadin
1. Ayn al-Hayat Ahmad
3. Dilbar Jihan Qadin

== Sources ==
- Doumani, Beshara (February 1, 2012). Family History in the Middle East: Household, Property, and Gender. SUNY Press. ISBN 978-0-791-48707-5.
