= Muhammad Ali dynasty family tree =

The Muhammad Ali dynasty ruled Egypt without interruption from Muhammad Ali's seizure of power in 1805 until the proclamation of the Republic in 1953. Eleven individuals (all of them men) ruled Egypt during the dynasty's 148-year lifespan. Due to the polygamous unions of several 19th-century rulers and their often numerous offspring, it is impossible to list all of the descendants of Muhammad Ali Pasha in a single chart. The family tree below is far from exhaustive; its mere aim is to show the family relationships between the dynasty's eleven rulers as well as its two regents.

| | Marriage |
| | Descent |
| Monarch | MONARCHS |

Amina Hanim | ^{(1)} MUHAMMAD ALI PASHA; Wāli (1805–48) | Ayn al-Hayat Qadin
Bamba Qadin | Tusun Pasha | ^{(2)} IBRAHIM PASHA; Wāli (1848) | Hoshiyar Qadin | ^{(4)} SA'ID PASHA; Wāli (1854–63)
Mahivech Hanim | ^{(3)} ABBAS I Wāli (1848–54) | Shafaq Nur Hanim | ^{(5)} ISMA'IL PASHA; Wāli (1863–67); Khedive (1867–79) | Nur Felek Qadin | Ferial Qadin
Damad Prince Ibrahim Ilhamy Pasha | Nasrin Qadin
Emina Ilhamy | ^{(6)} TEWFIK PASHA; Khedive (1879–92) | ^{(8)} HUSSEIN KAMEL; Sultan (1914–17) | ^{(9)} FUAD I Sultan (1917–22); King (1922–36) | Nazli Sabri
Ikbal Hanim | ^{(7)} ABBAS II; Khedive (1892–1914) | Prince Muhammad Ali Tewfik; Regent for Farouk I (1936–37) | Narriman Sadek | ^{(10)} FAROUK I King (1936–52)
Prince Muhammad Abdel Moneim; Regent for Fuad II (1952–53) | ^{(11)} FUAD II; King (1952–53)

== Simplified version ==
Muhammad Ali Pasha; Wāli 1805-48^{(1)}
Tusun Pasha | Ibrahim Pasha; Wāli 1848^{(2)} | Isma'il Kamil Pasha | Sa'id Pasha; Wāli 1854-63^{(4)}
Abbas Hilmi I Wāli 1848-54^{(3)} | Ahmad Rifaat Pasha | Isma'il Pasha; Wāli 1863-67^{(5)} Khedive 1867-79 | Mustafa Fazıl Pasha
Damad Prince Ibrahim Ilhamy Pasha
Emina Ilhamy | Tewfik Pasha; Khedive 1879-92^{(6)} | Hussein Kamel; Sultan 1914-17^{(8)} | Fuad I Sultan 1917-22^{(9)} King 1922-36
Abbas Hilmi II; Khedive 1892-1914^{(7)} | Muhammad Ali Tewfik (Regent 1936–37) | Prince Kamal el Dine Hussein | Farouk I King 1936-52^{(10)}
Muhammad Abdel Moneim (Regent 1952–53) | Prince Ali Samy Kamal | Fuad II; King 1952-53^{(11)}
Prince Abbas Hilmi | Prince Aiman Ali-Samy | Muhammad Ali, Prince of the Sa'id
Prince Daoud Abdel Moneim | Prince Ramsey Aiman Ali | Fouad Zaher Hassan, Prince of Egypt

== See also ==
- List of monarchs of the Muhammad Ali Dynasty
- History of Egypt under the Muhammad Ali dynasty
