= Khedivial Agricultural Society =

The Khedivial Agricultural Society was the first Egyptian agricultural society founded in 1898 under the patronage of Husayn Kamil. it served in place of a government ministry of agriculture until 1910, providing direction to Egypt's agricultural policy with the support of a staff of British agricultural scientists.

The foundation of the Khedivial Agricultural Society was impelled by the lack of a local, Egyptian controlled agricultural society that could conduct scientific studies to mitigate agricultural problems under the British Occupation. It was a free association of paying members, mostly farmers, which arranged exhibits, promoted research, and worked for the interests of agriculture in Egypt generally. It was reorganized in I904, for the purpose of establishing branch associations, under the leadership of graduates of Giza College.

One of the activities of the Society was to ensure that good quality cotton seed was available to farmers on favourable terms to ensure consistency in the quality and value of the harvest. in 1914 the Society undertook experiments with mechanised plowing.

The Society helped stage a display of Egyptian cotton and other produce at the St. Louis World's Fair in 1904.
