= Ayn al-Hayat Qadin =

Spouse of Muhammad Ali Pasha

- Died: 1849; Cairo, Egypt
- Burial: Hosh al-Basha, Imam-i Shafi'i Mausoleum, Cairo, Egypt
- Spouse: Muhammad Ali Pasha
- Issue: Sa'id of Egypt
Names
- Arabic: عين الحياة خانم قادین; Turkish: Aynülhayat Kadın
- House: Muhammad Ali (by marriage)

Ayn al-Hayat Qadin (Arabic: عين الحياة خانم قادین; Turkish: Aynülhayat Kadın; died 1849; meaning "Spring of life") was a consort of Muhammad Ali of Egypt (1769–1849), the first monarch of the Muhammad Ali dynasty, and mother of Sa'id of Egypt (1822–1863), Wāli of Egypt and Sudan from 1854 until 1863.

== Life ==
Of Circassian origin, Ayn al-Hayat was a victim of the Circassian slave trade, married Muhammad Ali, and gave birth to her only son on 17 March 1822. She was widowed at Muhammad Ali's death in 1848.

She died in 1849, five years before her son Sa'id ascended the throne. She was buried in Hosh al-Basha, the mausoleum of the Royal Family in Fustat, Cairo, Egypt.

== See also ==
- Muhammad Ali Dynasty family tree
