= Sultanate of Egypt =

British protectorate, 1914–1922

Coordinates: 30°3′N 31°13′E

Sultanate of Egypt السلطنة المصرية (Arabic) Al-Salṭana Al-Miṣrīyya
- 1914–1922
- Flag Coat of arms
- Anthem: سلام أفندينا; Salam Affandina "Salute of Our Lord"
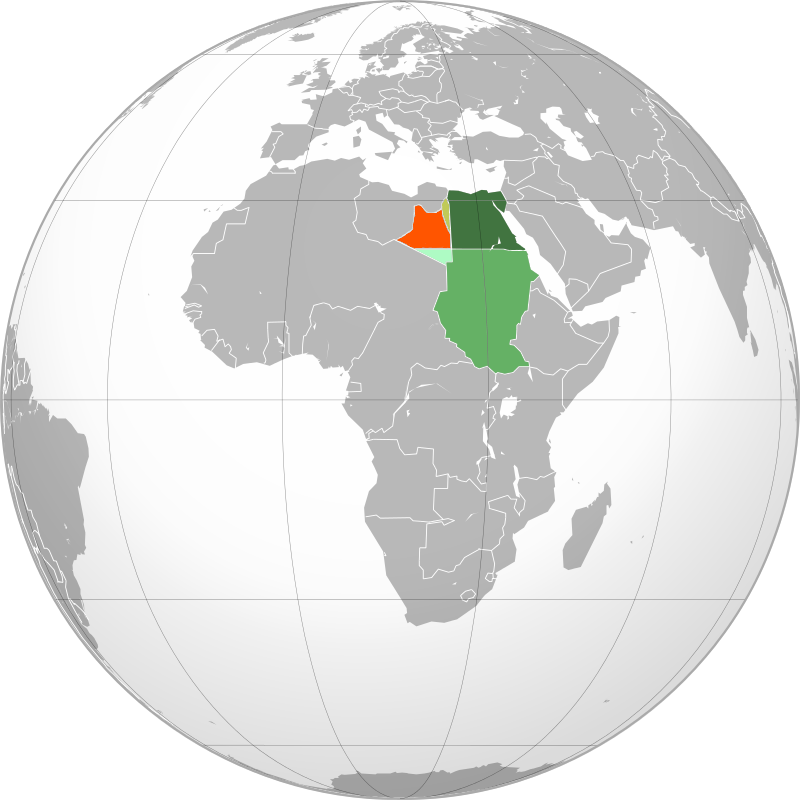
- Green: Sultanate of Egypt; Light green: Anglo-Egyptian Sudan condominium Lightest green: Ceded from Anglo-Egyptian Sudan to Italian Libya in 1919
- Status: Protectorate of the United Kingdom
- Capital and largest city: Cairo
- Official languages: Arabic
- Common languages: Egyptian Arabic
- Religion: Sunni Islam (official); Coptic Orthodox Church; Judaism
- Government: Constitutional monarchy
- Sultan
  - 1914–1917: Hussein Kamel
  - 1917–1922: Fuad I
- British High Commissioner
  - 1914–1916: Sir Henry McMahon
  - 1916–1919: Sir Reginald Wingate
  - 1919–1925: The 1st Viscount Allenby
- Prime Minister
  - 1914–1919: Hussein Rushdi
  - 1919: Mohamed Said
  - 1919–1920: Youssef Wahba
  - 1920–1921: Thawfeek Naseem
  - 1921: Adly Yakan
- Legislature: Legislative Assembly
- Historical era: World War I • Interwar period
  - Established: 19 December 1914
  - Revolution: 1919–1922
  - Independence: 28 February 1922
  - Coronation of Fuad I: 15 March 1922

Population
  - 1917: 12,751,000
- Currency: Egyptian pound
Preceded by	Succeeded by
Khedivate of Egypt	Kingdom of Egypt
- Today part of: Egypt; Sudan; South Sudan; Libya

The Sultanate of Egypt (Arabic: السلطنة المصرية, romanised: Al-Salṭana Al-Miṣrīyya) was a British protectorate in Egypt which existed from 1914, after the outbreak of World War I, to 1922, when it ceased to exist following the Unilateral Declaration of Egyptian Independence and the establishment of the Kingdom of Egypt.

== History ==
Soon after the start of the First World War, Khedive Abbas II of Egypt was removed from power by the British due to his pro-Ottoman positions. He was replaced by his uncle Hussein Kamel, who declared Egypt's independence from the Ottoman Empire and proclaimed himself as Sultan. Though presented as the re-establishment of the pre-Ottoman Egyptian sultanate, the newly created Sultanate was to be a British protectorate, with effective political and military power vested in British officials. This brought to an end the de jure Ottoman sovereignty over Egypt, which had been largely nominal since Muhammad Ali's seizure of power in 1805.

Opposition to European interference in Egyptian affairs resulted in the emergence of a nationalist movement that coalesced and spread. British actions during the First World War, including the purchase of cotton stocks and requisitioning of animal fodder at below-market prices, the conscription of 55,000 Egyptians into the Egyptian Labour Corps and the Egyptian Camel Transport Corps of the Egyptian Expeditionary Force and the stationing of large numbers of Allied troops in Egypt caused widespread resentment among the Egyptian populace. After the war, the Egyptian economy felt the adverse effects of soaring prices and unemployment.

Upon Hussein Kamel's death, his only son, Prince Kamal el Dine Hussein, declined the succession, and Hussein Kamel's brother Ahmed Fuad ascended the throne as Fuad I.

When the war ended, Egyptian nationalists began to press the British government again for independence. In addition to their other reasons, the Egyptians were influenced by American president Woodrow Wilson, who was advocating self-determination for all nations. In September 1918, Egypt made the first moves toward the formation of a wafd, or delegation, to voice its demands for independence at the Paris Peace Conference. The idea for a wafd had originated among prominent members of the Umma Party, including Lutfi as Sayyid, Saad Zaghlul, Muhammad Mahmud Pasha, Ali Sharawi, and Abd al Aziz Fahmi.

On 13 November 1918, thereafter celebrated in Egypt as Yawm al Jihad (Day of Struggle), Zaghlul, Fahmi, and Sharawi were granted an audience with General Sir Reginald Wingate ('Wingate Pasha'), the British High Commissioner. They demanded complete independence with the proviso that Britain be allowed to supervise the Suez Canal and the public debt. They also asked permission to go to London to put their case before the British government. On the same day, the Egyptians formed a delegation for this purpose, Al Wafd al Misri (known as the Wafd), headed by Saad Zaghlul. The British administration in Egypt refused to allow the Wafd to proceed to London.

On 8 March, Zaghlul and three other members of the Wafd were arrested and jailed in the Qasr an Nil prison. The next day, they were deported to Malta, an action that sparked the popular uprising of March/April 1919 in which Egyptians of all social classes participated. There were violent clashes in Cairo and the provincial cities of Lower Egypt, especially Tanta, and the uprising spread to the south, culminating in violent confrontations in Asyut Province in Upper Egypt.

The deportation of the Wafdists also triggered student demonstrations and escalated into massive strikes by students, government officials, professionals, women, and transport workers. Within a week, all of Egypt was paralysed by general strikes and rioting. Railway and telegraph lines were cut, taxi drivers refused to work, lawyers failed to appear for court cases, and demonstrators marched through the streets shouting pro-Wafdist slogans and demanding independence. Violence erupted during the revolution between British forces and Egyptian protestors, which resulted in numerous people killed and wounded on both sides.

On 16 March, between 150 and 300 upper-class Egyptian women in veils staged a demonstration against the British occupation, an event that marked the entrance of Egyptian women into public life. The women were led by Safiya Zaghlul, wife of Wafd leader Saad Zaghlul; Huda Sharawi, wife of one of the original members of the Wafd and organiser of the Egyptian Feminist Union; and Muna Fahmi Wissa. Women of the lower classes demonstrated in the streets alongside the men. In the countryside, women engaged in activities like cutting rail lines.

The upper-class women participating in politics for the first time assumed key roles in the movement when the male leaders were exiled or detained. They organised strikes, demonstrations, and boycotts of British goods and wrote petitions, which they circulated to foreign embassies protesting British control in Egypt.

The women's march of 16 March preceded by one day the largest demonstration of the 1919 revolution. More than 10,000 teachers, students, workers, lawyers, and government employees started marching at Al Azhar and wound their way to Abdin Palace where they were joined by thousands more, who ignored British roadblocks and bans. Soon, similar demonstrations broke out in Alexandria, Tanta, Damanhur, Al Mansurah, and Al Fayyum. By the summer of 1919, more than 800 Egyptians had been killed, as well as 31 European civilians and 29 British imperial soldiers.

General Wingate, the British High Commissioner, understood the strength of the nationalist forces and the threat the Wafd represented to British control over Egypt and had tried to persuade the British Government to allow the Wafd to travel to Paris. However, the British Government remained hostile to Zaghlul and the nationalists and adamant in rejecting Egyptian demands for independence. General Wingate was recalled to London for talks on the Egyptian situation, while Sir Milne Cheetham was appointed Acting High Commissioner in January 1919.

== Egyptian revolution of 1919 ==
When the 1919 revolution began, Cheetham soon realised that he was powerless to stop the demonstrations and admitted that matters were completely out of his control. Nevertheless, the government in London ordered him not to give in to the Wafd and to restore order, a task that he was unable to accomplish.

London decided to replace Wingate with a strong military figure, Field Marshal Sir Edmund Allenby (later created 1st Viscount Allenby in October of that year), one of the greatest British heroes of World War I. He was named special high commissioner and arrived in Egypt on 25 March. The next day, he met with a group of Egyptian nationalists and ulama. After persuading Field Marshal Allenby to release the Wafd leaders and to permit them to travel to Paris, the Egyptian group agreed to sign a statement urging the people to stop demonstrating. Allenby, who was convinced that this was the only way to stop the revolt, then had to persuade the British government to agree. On 7 April, Zaghlul and his colleagues were released and set out for Paris.

In May 1919, Lord Milner was appointed to head a mission to investigate how Egypt could be granted "self-governing institutions" while maintaining the protectorate and safeguarding British interests. The mission arrived in Egypt in December 1919 but was boycotted by Egyptian nationalists, who opposed the continuation of the protectorate. The arrival of the Milner Mission was followed by strikes in which students, lawyers, professionals, and workers participated. Merchants closed their shops, and organisers distributed leaflets urging the Egyptians not to co-operate with the mission.

Milner realised that a direct approach to Zaghlul was necessary, and in the summer of 1920 private talks between the two men took place in London. As a result of the so-called Milner-Zaghlul Agreement, the British government announced in February 1921 that it would accept the abolition of the protectorate as the basis for negotiation of a treaty with Egypt.

On 4 April 1921, Zaghlul's return to Egypt was met by an unprecedented welcome, showing that the vast majority of Egyptians supported him. Allenby, however, was determined to break Zaghlul's political power and to build up a pro-British group of Egyptians to whom Britain could safely commit Egyptian independence. On 23 December, Zaghlul was deported to the Seychelles via Aden. His deportation was followed by demonstrations, violent clashes with the police, and strikes by students and government employees that affected Cairo, Alexandria, Port Said, Suez, and provincial towns like Tanta, Zifta, Az Zaqaziq, and Jirja.

== Egyptian Independence (1922) ==
On 28 February 1922, Britain unilaterally declared Egyptian independence, which proved controversial with Egyptian nationalists. Four matters were "absolutely reserved to the discretion" of the British government until agreements concerning them could be negotiated: the security of communications of the British Empire in Egypt; the defence of Egypt against all foreign aggressors or interference, direct or indirect; the protection of foreign interests in Egypt and the protection of minorities; and Sudan.

Britain subsequently exercised power over a nominally independent Egypt informally, as it had between 1882 and 1914.

Sultan Ahmad Fuad became King Fuad I, and his son, Faruk, was named as his heir. Field Marshal Lord Allenby remained on, until 1925, as British High Commissioner. On 19 April, a new constitution was approved. Also that month, an electoral law was issued that ushered in a new phase in Egypt's political development—parliamentary elections.

== See also ==
- Muhammad Ali dynasty
- Sultan of Egypt
- Egyptian Expeditionary Force
- Sinai and Palestine campaign
- Middle Eastern theatre of World War I
