= Bamba Qadin =

Walida Pasha of Egypt (died 1871)

Walida Pasha of Egypt
- Tenure: 10 November 1848 – 13 July 1854
- Predecessor: Title created
- Successor: Hoshiyar Qadin
- Born: Egypt or Ottoman Empire
- Died: 1871; Ataba al-Khadra Palace, Cairo, Egypt
- Burial: Qubbat Afandina, Khedive Tawfik Mausoleum, Kait Bey, Cairo, Egypt
- Spouse: Tusun Pasha
- Issue: Abbas I of Egypt
- House: Muhammad Ali (by marriage)
- Religion: Sunni Islam

Bamba Qadin (Arabic: بامبا قادین; Turkish: Pembe Kadın; died 1871; name meaning "Pink") was an Egyptian princess, and a member of the Muhammad Ali Dynasty. She was the wife of Tusun Pasha (1794–1816) the second son of Muhammad Ali Pasha and the Walida Pasha to their son Abbas Hilmi Pasha (1812–1854). According to the family documents of Rukiye Kuneralp, Bamba may have been a daughter of Mehmed Arif Bey, and sister of Fatma Zehra Hanım, wife of Muhammad Ali Pasha's son, Isma'il Pasha.

Bamba married Tusun Pasha, and gave birth to Abbas Hilmi Pasha on 1 July 1812. When Tusun died of plague at the age of twenty three in 1816, her mother-in-law Amina Hanim, took her and her son, to live with her, and refused to be parted from him.

The Sibil Kuttab Umm Abbas at Saliba Street in Cairo was built in her honor.

She died in 1871 in Ataba al-Khadra Palace, Cairo, and was buried in Qubbat Afandina, Khedive Tewfik Pasha Mausoleum, in Afifi zone.

== See also ==
- Muhammad Ali Dynasty family tree

== Sources ==
- Cuno, Kenneth M. (April 1, 2015). Modernizing Marriage: Family, Ideology, and Law in Nineteenth- and Early Twentieth-Century Egypt. Syracuse University Press. ISBN 978-0-815-65316-5.
- Doumani, Beshara (February 1, 2012). Family History in the Middle East: Household, Property, and Gender. SUNY Press. ISBN 978-0-791-48707-5.

Egyptian royalty
Preceded by Title created	Walida Pasha of Egypt; 10 November 1848 – 13 July 1854	Succeeded by Hoshiyar Qadin
