= Hosh al-Basha =

Mausoleum in Cairo, Egypt

Coordinates: 30.012069°N 31.257277°E

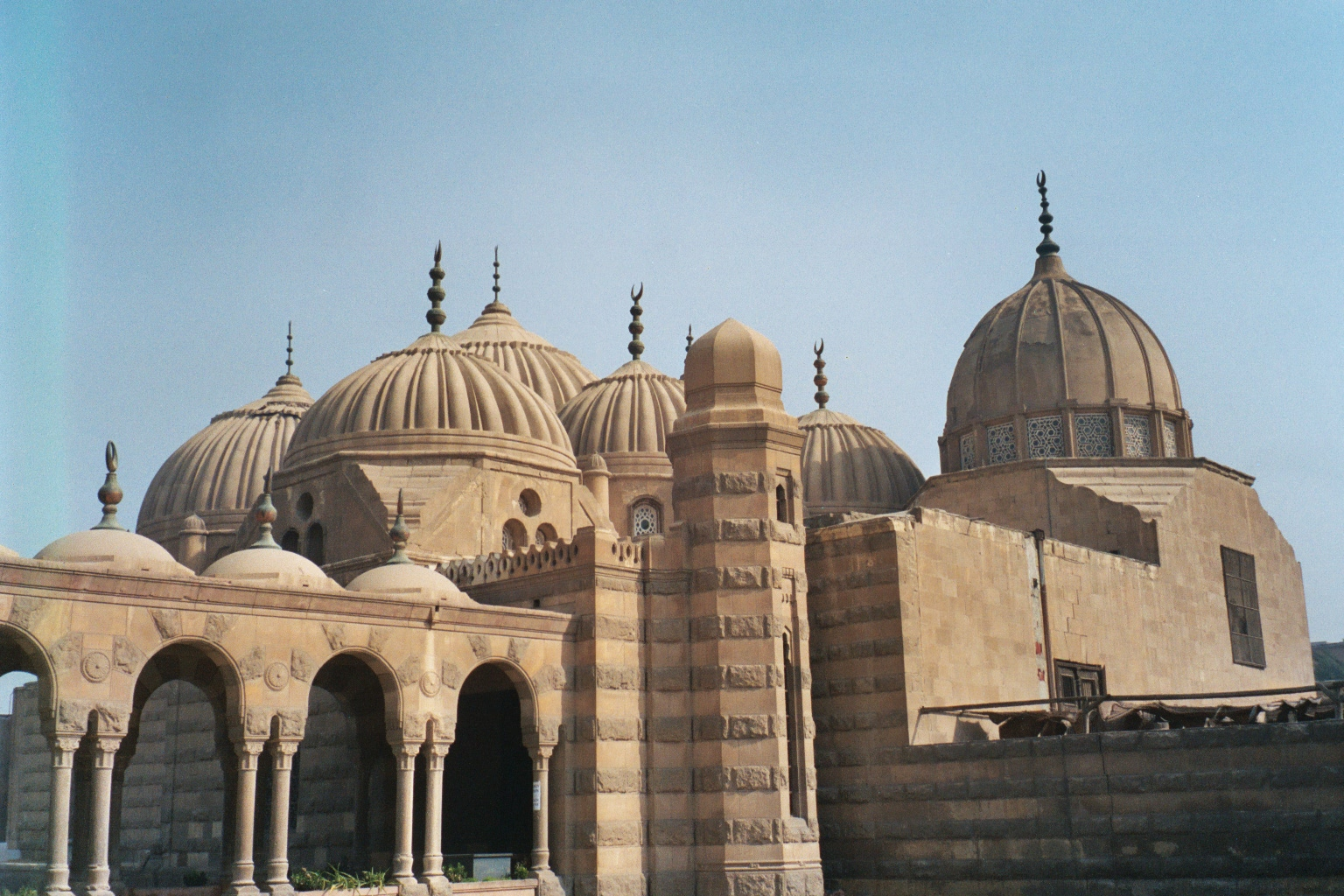
- Interactive map of Hosh al-Basha
- Location: Fustat, Southern Cemetery, Cairo, Egypt

History
- Built: A.D.1854 / 1271 A.H.
- Built for: Muhammad Ali dynasty

Site notes
- Architectural style: Ottoman architecture

Hosh al-Basha (Arabic: حوش الباشا, romanized: hawsh al-basha, lit. 'courtyard of the pasha'), also Hosh el-Basha, Hawsh al-Basha, or Hosh el-Pasha), is a mausoleum of the royal family of Muhammad Ali Pasha at road al-Imam Al-Shafi‘i in the Southern Cemetery of Cairo, Egypt.

== Description ==
Hosh al-Pasha was built in 1854 to house several tombs of the Muhammad Ali dynasty’s family and devoted servants. The structure is a multi-domed complex with inner courtyards and chambers heavily decorated by Islamic motifs, colors and precious materials that still show much of the original luxurious and rich state of the place.

Some of the members of the Muhammad Ali dynasty buried in Hosh al-Basha are Ibrahim Pasha, Tusun Pasha, Isma'il Pasha, Sa'id Pasha, Abbas I, Ahmad Rifaat Pasha and his daughter Ayn-al-Hayat Rifaat, Mohammed Ali Tewfik, Muhammad Ali’s sister Zubaida Khanum and her descendants from the Yeghen branch of the royal family

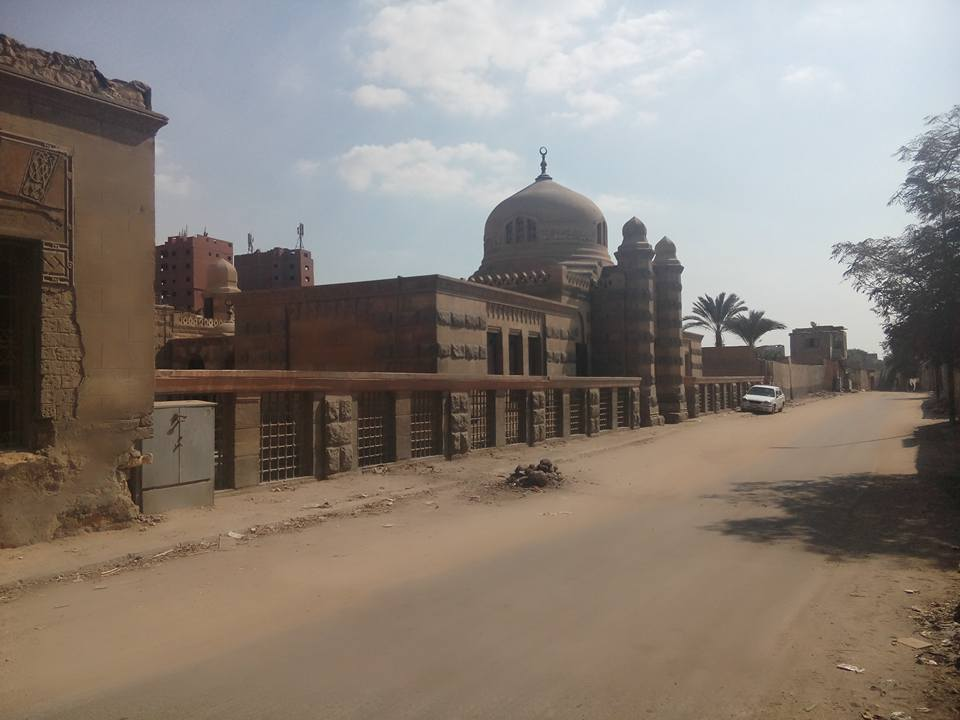
Street view of the complex (seen from the northwest)

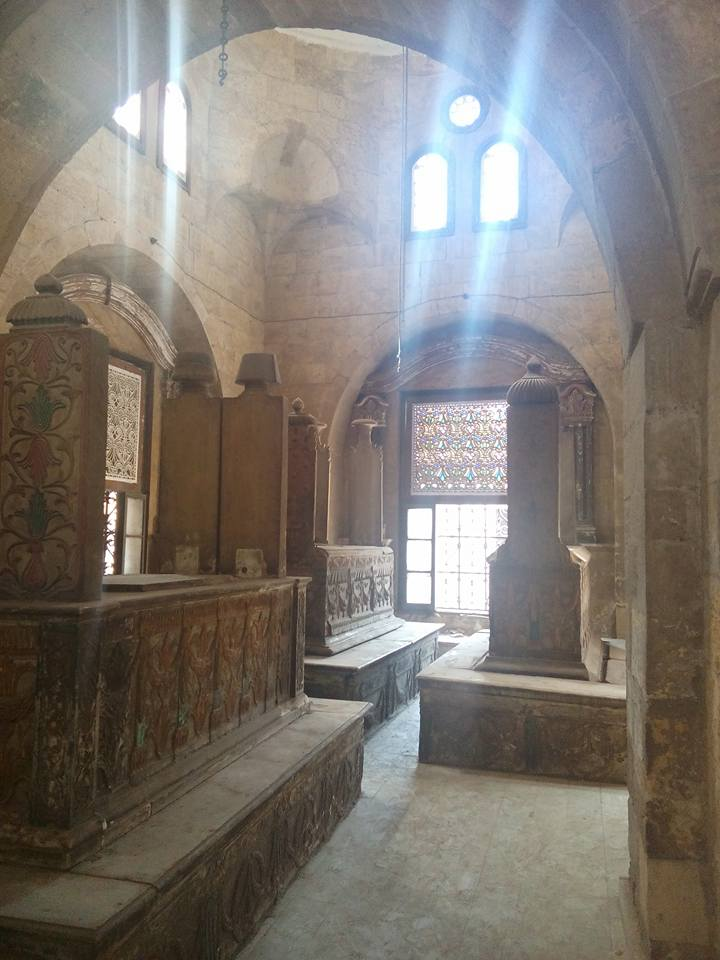
One of the mausoleum chambers

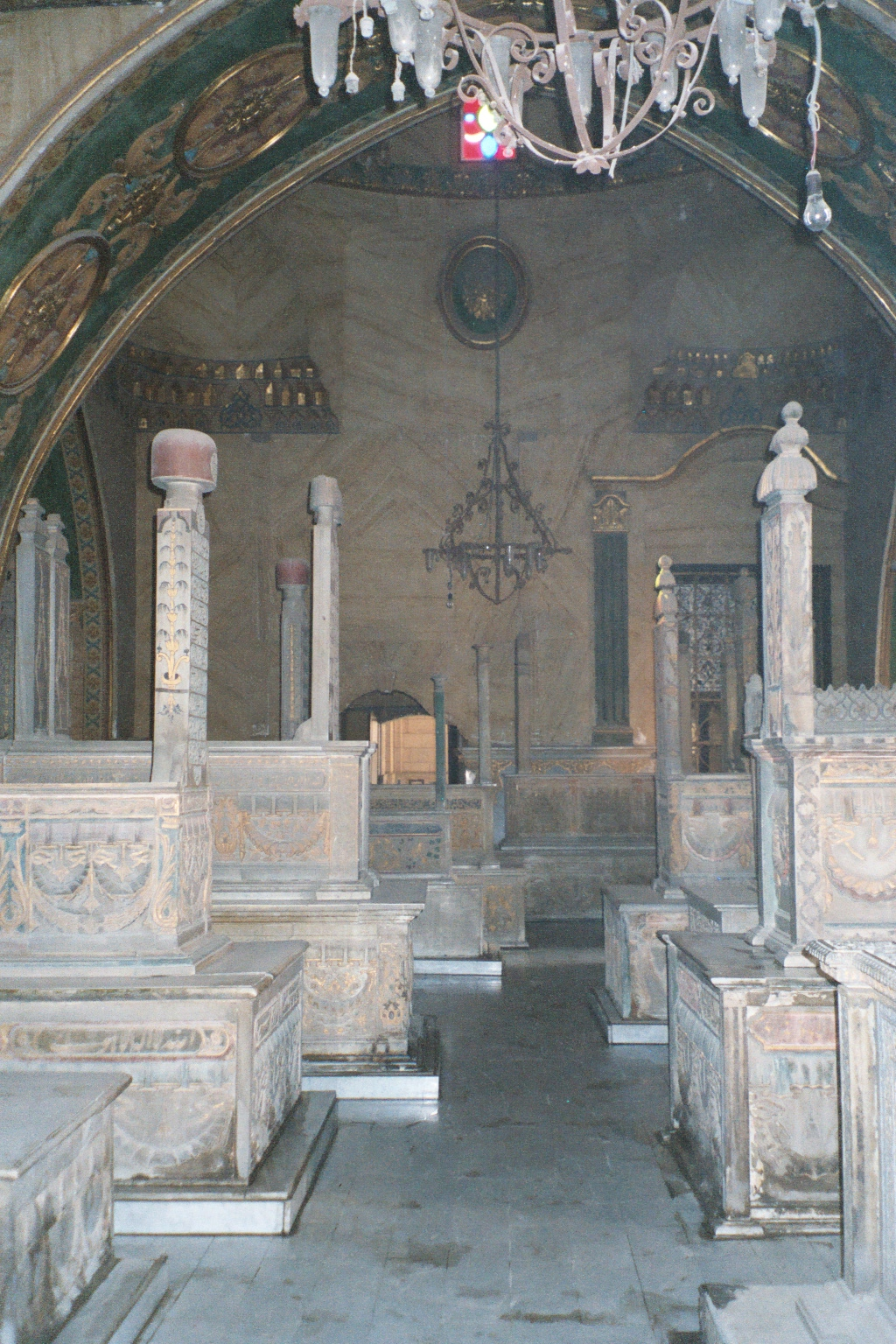
One of the mausoleum chambers

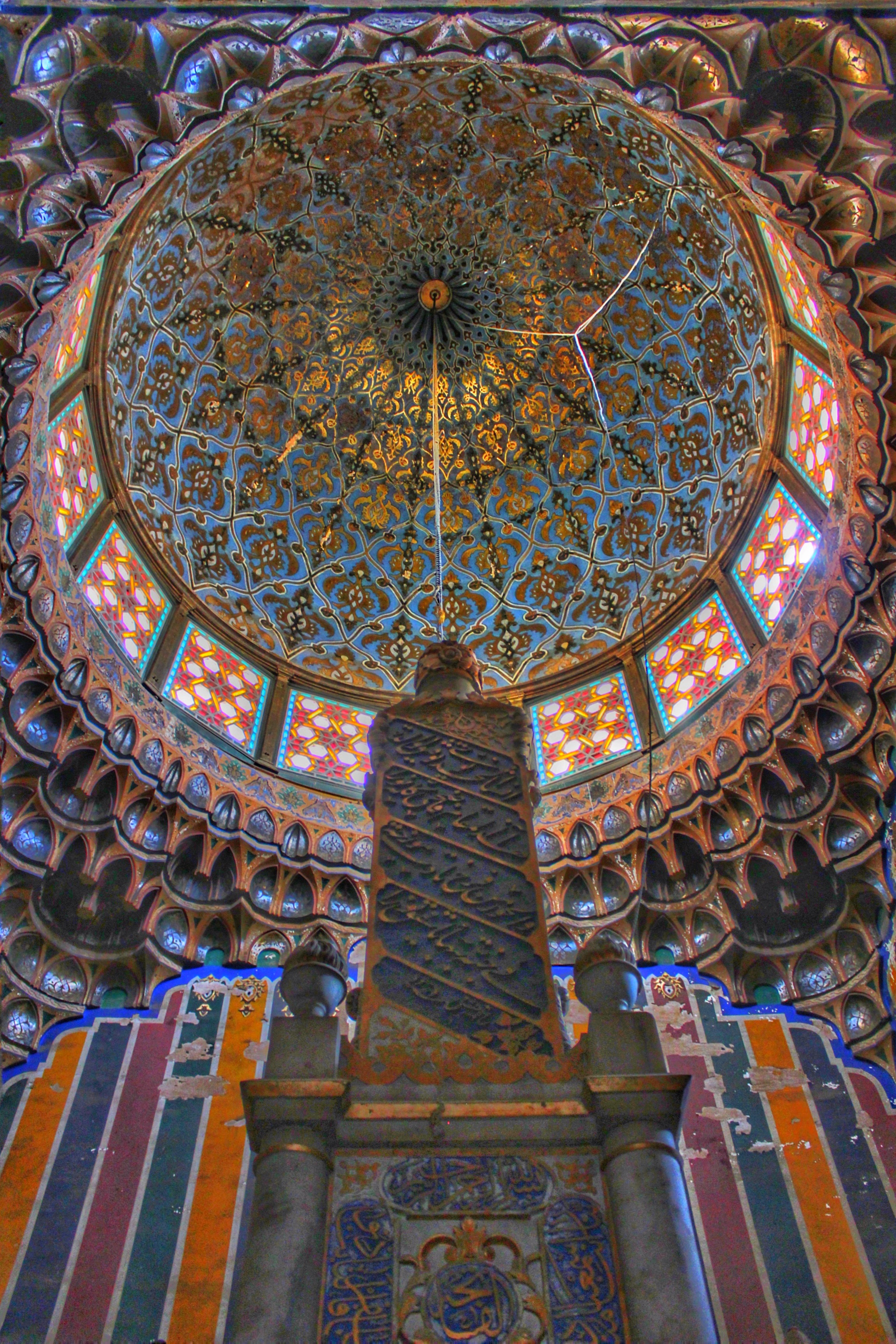
One of the main domes

== See also ==
- Muhammad Ali dynasty family tree
- List of mausolea
- List of monarchs of the Muhammad Ali dynasty
