= Prince Kamal el Dine Hussein =

Egyptian prince

Kamal el Dine Hussein
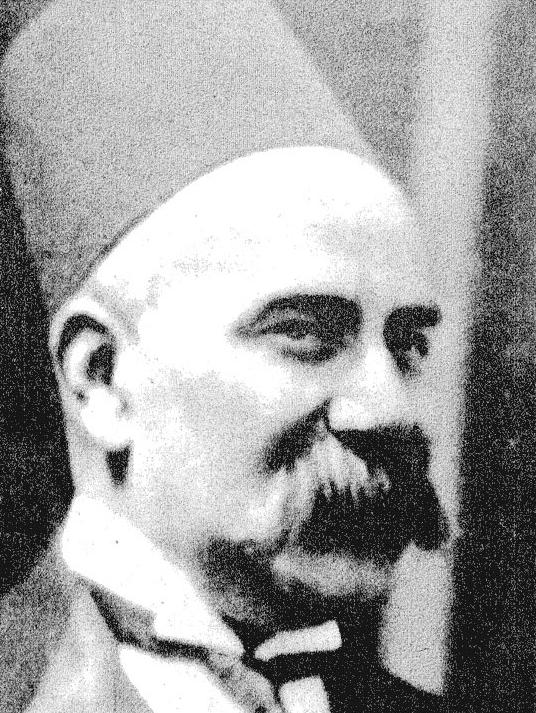
- Successor: Prince Ali Samy Kamal
- Born: 20 December 1874; Cairo, Egypt
- Died: 6 August 1932 (aged 57); Toulouse, France
- Burial: Mausoleum in the Mokattam Hills
- Spouse: Princess Nimet Allah
- House: House of Muhammad Ali
- Father: Hussein Kamel
- Mother: Ayn al-Hayat Ahmad
- Religion: Islam
- Occupation: Officer, collector, explorer, traveler

Prince Kamal el Dine Hussein (Arabic: كمال الدين حسين) (20 December 1874 – 6 August 1932) was the son of Sultan Hussein Kamel of Egypt.

== Renunciation of succession rights ==
Several otherwise reliable sources mistakenly assert that Kamal el Dine Hussein held the position of heir during his father's three-year reign. In reality, Hussein Kamel had agreed with the British government upon his ascension to the throne to postpone the establishment of new rules of succession for the sultanate, meaning that the position of heir to the throne remained vacant. The succession issue was discussed between Hussein Kamel and British High Commissioner Henry McMahon in May 1915 in the wake of the failed assassination attempt against the sultan. Hussein Kamel preferred to be succeeded by his son Kamal el Dine, but also recommended his half-brother Ahmed Fouad and his cousin Youssef Kamal in case Kamal el Dine was unwilling to assume the position of heir. For his part, Kamal el Dine wrote a letter to his father in which he expressly and voluntarily renounced the succession. This was the only time in Egyptian history that an eligible heir gave up his rights to the throne of his own free will.

On 21 September 1917, three weeks before Hussein Kamel's death, the British chose Ahmed Fouad as his successor. However, they first requested that Kamal el Dine make a formal renunciation of the throne, in order for the United Kingdom not to appear in the eyes of the Egyptian public as having deprived him of his legitimate rights. Although there were rumours that Kamel el Dine had declined the succession under the influence of his wife Nimet Allah (who did not recognize the legitimacy of her brother Abbas Hilmi II's dethronement), most historians explain his decision by his unwillingness to reign under a British protectorate which he strongly opposed. Others give more mundane reasons, pointing out that the prince asked to be relieved of responsibility in order to be able to pursue an exciting life of discovery and travel. Kamal el Dine Hussein was indeed an avid explorer, traveler and collector of oriental antiquities and works of art. In 1925 and 1926 he led expeditions to the Gilf Kebir ('great wall') which he named, using innovative Citroën half-tracks.

A famous reference to Kamal el Dine Hussein occurs in the opening pages of Nobel laureate Naguib Mahfouz's novel Palace Walk (1956), where one of the protagonists states: "What a fine man Prince Kamal al-Din Husayn is! Do you know what he did? He refused to ascend the throne of his late father so long as the British are in charge."

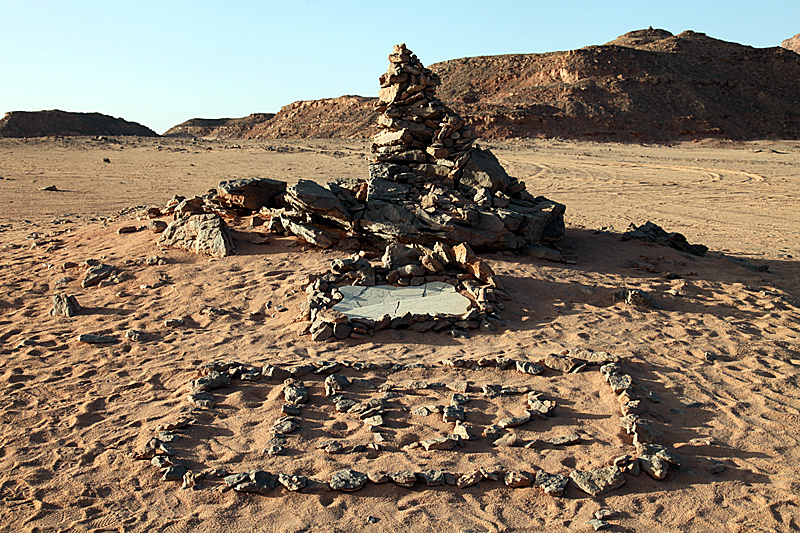
Rock monument at the foot of the Gilf Kebir Plateau

In 1934, a year after his death, fellow desert explorer László Almásy erected a monument to his one-time sponsor and friend, at the southern tip of the Gilf Kebir plateau at the far end of Egypt's Western Desert, part of the greater Libyan Desert.

== Military career ==
Educated at the Theresian Military Academy in Austria, Prince Kamal el Dine Hussein attained the rank of general and became the commander-in-chief of the Egyptian Army in 1914.

== Marriage ==
Prince Kamal el Dine Hussein married in Cairo on 5 May 1904 to Princess Nimet Allah (1881–1965), the youngest daughter of Khedive Tewfik Pasha. The couple gave birth to Prince Ali Samy Kamal (1920-2008).

== Ancestry ==
Ancestors of Prince Kamal el Dine Hussein

16. Muhammad Ali Pasha (= #24)
8. Ibrahim Pasha (= #12)
17. Amina Nosratli (= #25)
4. Isma'il Pasha
9. Khushiyar
2. Hussein Kamel
5. Jananyar
1. Kamal el Dine Hussein
24. Muhammad Ali Pasha (= #16)
12. Ibrahim Pasha (= #8)
25. Amina Nosratli (= #17)
6. Ahmed Rifaat Pasha
13. Shivakiar
3. Ayn ul-Hayat
7. Dilbar-Jahan

Professional and academic associations
Preceded by Hussein Kamel	President of the Royal Agricultural Society; 1914–1932	Succeeded by Omar Toussoun
