= Amina Hanim =

Consort of Muhammad Ali of Egypt (c. 1770 – 1824)

Amina Hanim misrilly
- Born: 1770; Nusretli, Rumelia Eyalet, Ottoman Empire (now Nikiforos, Greece)
- Died: 1824 (aged 53–54); Cairo, Egypt Eyalet, Ottoman Empire (now Egypt)
- Burial: Hosh al-Basha, Cairo
- Spouse: Ali Bey; Muhammad Ali (m. 1787)
- Issue: Ibrahim Pasha; Ahmad Tusun Pasha; Isma'il Kamil Pasha; Abd al-Halim Bey; Tawhida Hanim; Khadija Nazli Hanim
Names
- Arabic: أمينة هانم; Turkish: Emine Hanım
- House: Muhammad Ali (by marriage)
- Father: Nusretli Ali Agha al misrilly [the egyptian]
- Mother: Kadreya
- Religion: Sunni Islam

Amina Hanim (Arabic: أمينة هانم; Turkish: Emine Hanım; 1770 – 1824) was the first princess consort of Muhammad Ali, a former Ottoman Wāli (governor) turned ruler of Egypt and later the first monarch of the Muhammad Ali dynasty.

== Early life ==
Amina Hanim was born in 1770 at Nikiforos, Rumelia. She was the daughter of Nusretli Ali Agha, the governor of Kavala, and relative of the Chorbaji. She had two brothers, Mustafa Pasha, and Ali Pasha, and three sisters, Meryem Hanim, Pakize Hanim, and Iffet Hanim.

== First marriage ==
Amina Hanim had been earlier married to Ali Bey. However, their marriage was never consummated as her husband had died before the pair had cohabited.

== Second marriage ==
Amina Hanim married Muhammad Ali in 1787, long before he became the Viceroy of Egypt, and rising to the rank of Pasha. She gave birth to four sons who survived to adulthood, Ibrahim Pasha, Ahmad Tusun Pasha, Isma'il Kamil Pasha, Abd al-Halim Bey, and two daughters, Tawhida Hanim, and Khadija Nazli Hanim. Muhammad Ali had a fondness for her, and treated her with respect.

Amina Hanim did not accompany Muhammad Ali to Egypt, and after his appointment as viceroy in 1805, she and her daughters resided for a period of some two years in Istanbul, where they became thoroughly acquainted with imperial palace culture. Upon her arrival and installation in the Harem of the Muhammad Ali dynasty of the Citadel Palace in Cairo in 1808, Amina Hanim became estranged from Muhammad Ali due to the many slave concubines he had acquired.

In 1814, Amina Hanim made a pilgrimage, moving from Jeddah to Mecca with a train of 500 camels carrying her servants, entourage and goods. She was met by Muhammad Ali at Mina, a stage in the pilgrimage, in a public acknowledgment of her status as first consort. Due to the grandeur of her train and guard, and the sumptuous of her tent, the local inhabitants are said to have called her "the Queen of the Nile."

When her son Tosun Pasha died of plague at the age of 23 in 1816, Amina Hanim took his wife, Bamba Qadin, and her son Abbas, to live with her, and refused to be parted from him.

== Death ==
Amina Hanim died in 1824, and was buried at Hosh al-Basha, the mausoleum of Imam-i Shafi'i in Cairo.

== See also ==
- Muhammad Ali Dynasty family tree

== Sources ==
- Cuno, Kenneth M. (April 1, 2015). Modernizing Marriage: Family, Ideology, and Law in Nineteenth- and Early Twentieth-Century Egypt. Syracuse University Press. ISBN 978-0-815-65316-5.
- Sayyid-Marsot, Afaf Lutfi (January 12, 1984). Egypt in the Reign of Muhammad Ali. Cambridge University Press. ISBN 978-0-521-28968-9.
