= Egyptian frigate Ibrahim =

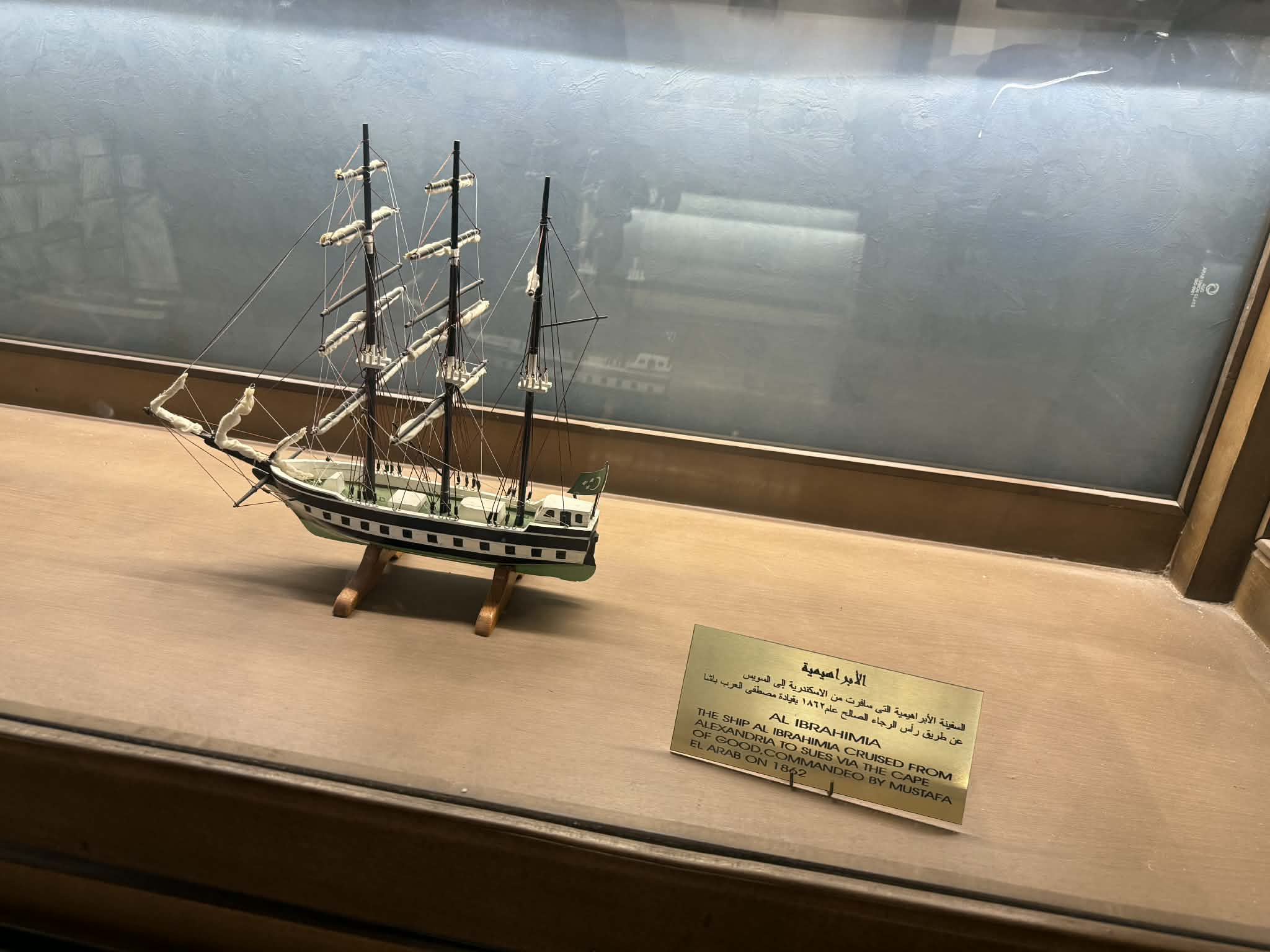
- A model of the Egyptian ship Ibrahimeih

History

Egypt
- Name: Ibrahim
- Builder: La Seyne, France
- Launched: 30 November 1868
- Fate: Scrapped in 1890

General characteristics
- Type: Iron frigate
- Displacement: 4700 t
- Length: 288 ft (87.8 m)
- Beam: 49 ft (14.9 m)
- Draught: 21 ft (6.4 m)
- Propulsion: 3,560 ihp (2,655 kW)
- Speed: 13.34 knots (24.71 km/h; 15.35 mph)

Ibrahim was a steam frigate built for the Egyptian Navy, and launched on November 30, 1868 at La Seyne. The ship was fully rigged and had an iron hull. At the time Egypt had also ordered several armored ironclads, the Nijmi Shevket class and the Lutfi Djelil class each of two ships. Although intended for the Egyptian Navy, these ironclads were delivered to the Ottoman Navy in 1869. In this period Egypt was nominally a province of the Ottoman Empire but was run autonomously (with increasing influence of French and British interests culminating in a British takeover in 1882). Egypt was apparently allowed to keep the large frigate Ibrahim, which with the smaller frigate Mehemet Ali and one corvette the Sakka formed the Egyptian steam navy until 1890, when the Ibrahim was scrapped and the other two ships had their machinery removed to become stationary guard ships at Alexandria and Port Said. Egypt also had a large iron yacht, the Mahroussa which survives in rebuilt form to the present day.

An alternate contemporary English spelling for the ship's name was Ibrahimeih.

== Bibliography ==
- Gardiner, Robert, ed. (1979). Conway's All the World's Fighting Ships 1860–1905. New York: Mayflower Books. ISBN 0-8317-0302-4.
- Brassey's Naval Annual 1889.
