= Nur Felek Qadin =

Sultana Mother of Egypt
- Tenure: 19 December 1914 – 15 August 1916
- Predecessor: Emina of Ilhamy (as Khediva Mother)
- Successor: Nazli Sabri (as Queen Mother)
- Died: 15 August 1916; Mamure Palace, Alexandria, Sultanate of Egypt
- Burial: Mausoleum of Imam al-Shafi'i
- Spouse: Isma'il Pasha of Egypt
- Issue: Hussein Kamel of Egypt
Names
- Arabic: نورفلک قادین; Turkish: Nurfelek Sultan
- House: Alawiyya (by childbirth)
- Religion: Sunni Islam

Nur Felek Sultan (Arabic: نورفلک قادین; Turkish: Nurfelek Sultan; died 15 August 1916), was a consort of Isma'il Pasha of Egypt.

Nur Felek Sultan married Isma'il Pasha, and gave birth to Prince Hussein Kamel Pasha on 21 November 1853. Isma'il was deposed in 1879, and was succeeded by his son Tewfik Pasha. She was widowed at Isma'il's death in 1895.

On 19 December 1914 the British Government declared Khedive Abbas Hilmi Pasha deposed, and proclaimed Prince Hussein Kamel Pasha as Sultan of Egypt. As a result, Nur Felek became the Walida Sultan, literally "mother of the sultan".

Nur Felek died at the Mamure Palace, Alexandria on Tuesday 15 August 1916, and was buried at Imam-i Shafi'i next day at 4 p.m.

Egyptian royalty
Preceded by Emina Ilhamy as Walida Pasha	Walida Sultan of Egypt; 19 December 1914 – 15 August 1916	Vacant Title next held by Nazli Sabri as Queen Mother
