= Tusun Pasha =

Egyptian military officer (1794–1816)

- Born: 1794
- Died: 28 September 1816 (aged 21–22)
- Spouse: Bamba Qadin
- Issue: Abbas I of Egypt
- Dynasty: Alawiyya
- Father: Muhammad Ali of Egypt
- Mother: Amina Hanim

Tusun Pasha (Ottoman Turkish: طوسون پاشا, Arabic: طوسون باشا, Turkish: Tosun Paşa, Ahmet Tosun Paşa; 1794 – 28 September 1816) was the younger son of Muhammad Ali Pasha, Wāli of Egypt between 1805 and 1849, by Amina Hanim. He was the father of Abbas I of Egypt (1812–1854) by princess Pembe Qadin. He is buried in Hosh al-Basha, the royal mausoleum of the royal family at the Imam al-Shafi'i, Cairo, Egypt.

== Life ==
Though not as well known as Muhammad Ali's other son Ibrahim Pasha, Tusun Pasha did nevertheless attain some historical significance in the Ottoman–Saudi War, having led in 1811 the successful military campaign of the Egyptian army in the Arabian Peninsula, which was taken up in order to subdue unrest created in that region by Wahabbi forces. Tusun Pasha successfully retook the city of Mecca, and occupied Hijaz.

It appears from historical records that, despite not being the eldest son, Tusun was destined by Muhammad Ali to carry on his legacy. This aspiration, however, was not to materialise, as Tusun died in 1816 – possibly of disease – in the village of Birinbal. His older brother Ibrahim succeeded him in the role of chief military commander.

== Legacy ==
Decades later, in 1848, Tusun's son, Abbas I, inherited the role of Wali from his uncle Ibrahim, and served in this position for six years, before being murdered in 1854.

The Alabaster Mosque (Mosque of Muhammad Ali) was built by Muhammad Ali Pasha in memory of his son Tusun Pasha. It is in the Citadel of Cairo in Egypt, with construction commissioned between 1830 and 1848.

== In popular culture ==
The 1976 Turkish film Tosun Paşa features a heavily fictionalised Tusun Pasha (played by Oktar Durukan) where the story involves his identity being taken by the protagonist played by Kemal Sunal.

== See also ==
- Muhammad Ali dynasty
