= Hussein Kamel of Egypt =

Sultan of Egypt from 1914 to 1917

Hussein Kamel حسين كامل
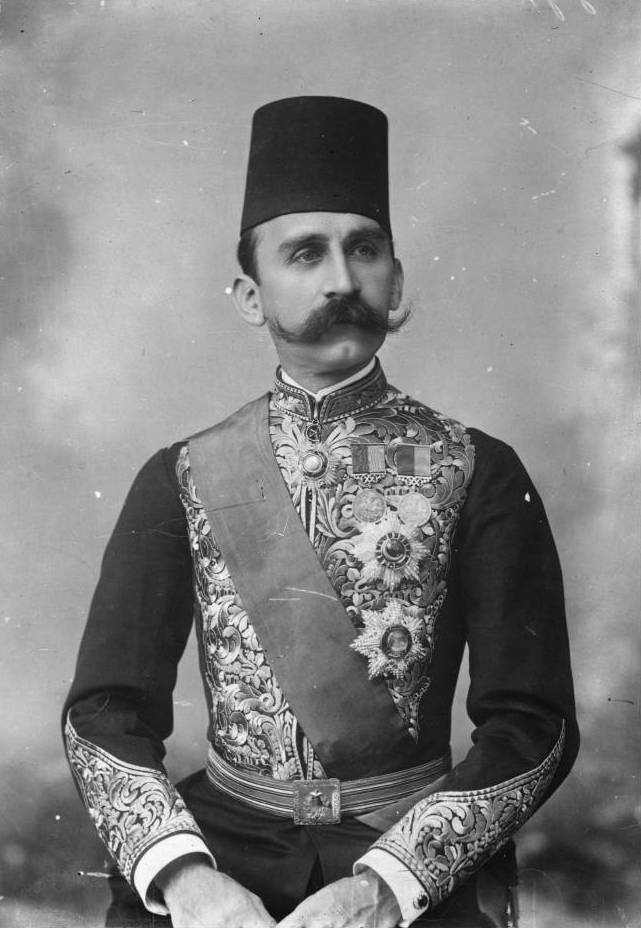
- Portrait by Charles Chusseau-Flaviens

Sultan of Egypt
- Reign: 19 December 1914 – 9 October 1917
- Predecessor: Abbas Hilmi II (as Khedive of Egypt)
- Successor: Fuad I
- Prime Minister: Hussein Roshdy Pasha
- Born: 21 November 1853; Cairo, Egypt Eyalet, Ottoman Empire
- Died: 9 October 1917 (aged 63); Cairo, Sultanate of Egypt
- Burial: Al-Rifa'i Mosque, Cairo, Egypt
- Spouse: Ayn al-Hayat Ahmad (m. 1873, divorced) Melek Tourhan (m. 1887)
- Issue: Prince Kamal el Dine Hussein; Princess Kazima Hussein; Princess Kamila Hussein; Prince Ahmed Kazim Hussein; Princess Kadria Hussein; Princess Samiha Hussein; Princess Badia Hussein
- House: Alawiyya
- Father: Isma'il I of Egypt
- Mother: Nur Felek Qadin

Hussein Kamel (Arabic: حسين كامل; 21 November 1853 – 9 October 1917) was the Sultan of Egypt from 19 December 1914 to 9 October 1917, during the British protectorate over Egypt. He was the first person to hold the title of Sultan of Egypt since the killing of Sultan Tuman Bay II by the Ottomans in 1517 following their conquest of Egypt.

== Life ==
Hussein Kamel was the second son of Khedive Isma'il Pasha, who ruled Egypt from 1863 to 1879. He was declared Sultan of Egypt on 19 December 1914, after the occupying British forces had deposed his nephew, Khedive Abbas Hilmi II, on 5 November 1914. Though presented as the re-establishment of the pre-Ottoman Egyptian sultanate, the newly created Sultanate of Egypt was to be a British protectorate, with effective political and military power vested in British officials. This brought to an end the de jure Ottoman sovereignty over Egypt, which had been largely nominal since Muhammad Ali's seizure of power in 1805.

In 1915, Kamel was the target of two assassination attempts. The first occurred on 8 April 1915, when an assassin targeted the Sultan's carriage while in Cairo. A second attempt was made 3 months later, on 9 July 1915, when a bomb was thrown at Hussein Kamel's carriage as he travelled to a mosque for Friday prayers.

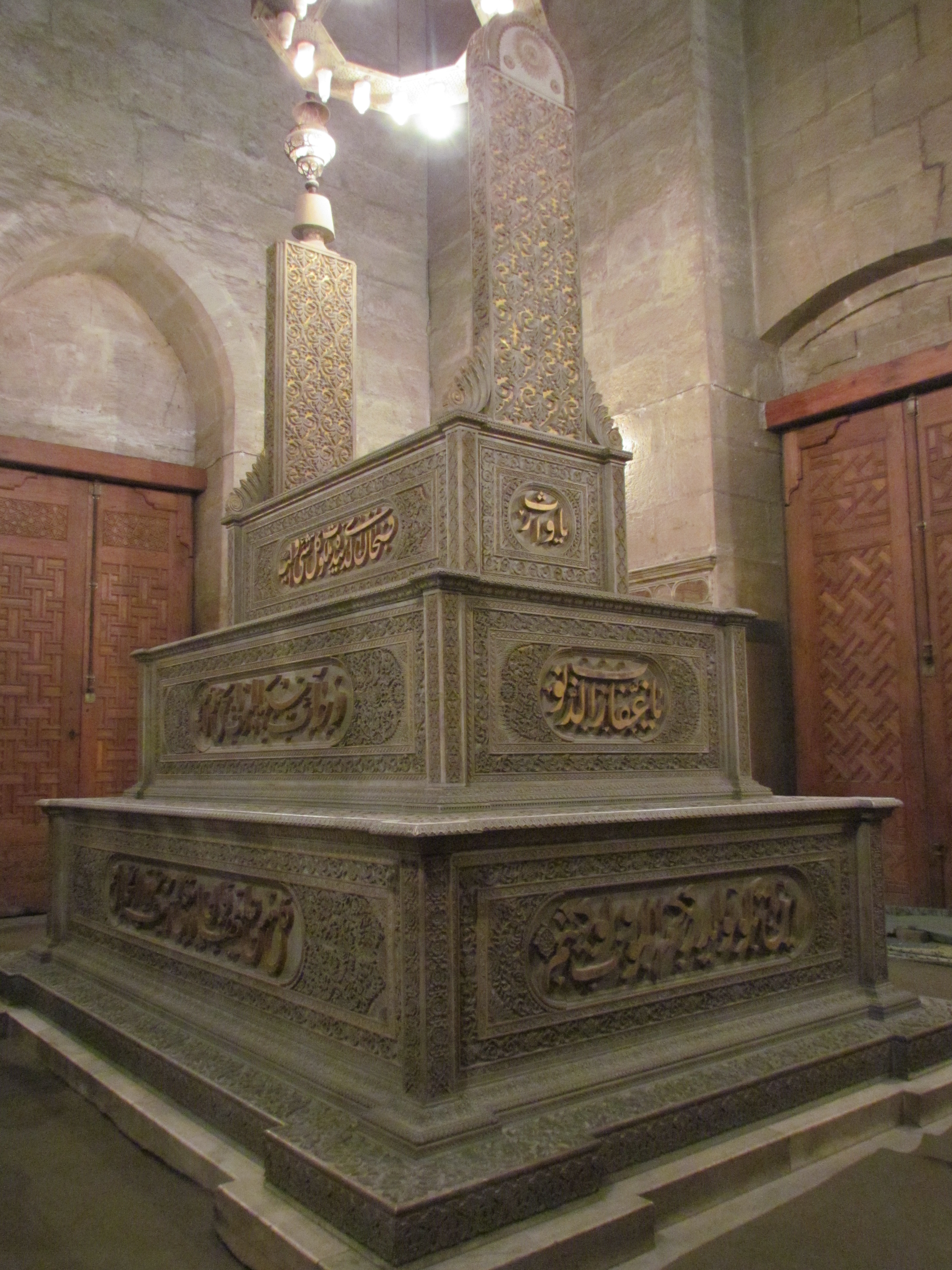
Tomb of Sultan Hussein Kamel at the Al-Rifa'i Mosque in Cairo

Upon Hussein Kamel's death, his only son, Prince Kamal el Dine Hussein, declined the succession, and Hussein Kamel's brother Ahmed Fuad ascended the throne as Fuad I. At the beginning of Naguib Mahfouz's novel Palace Walk, Ahmad Abd al-Jawwad says "What a fine man Prince Kamal al-Din Husayn is! Do you know what he did? He refused to ascend the throne of his late father so long as the British are in charge."

Stereoscope photographs of the coronation and burial processions of Sultan Hussein are available on the Rare Books and Special Collections Digital Library of the American University in Cairo.

== Honours ==
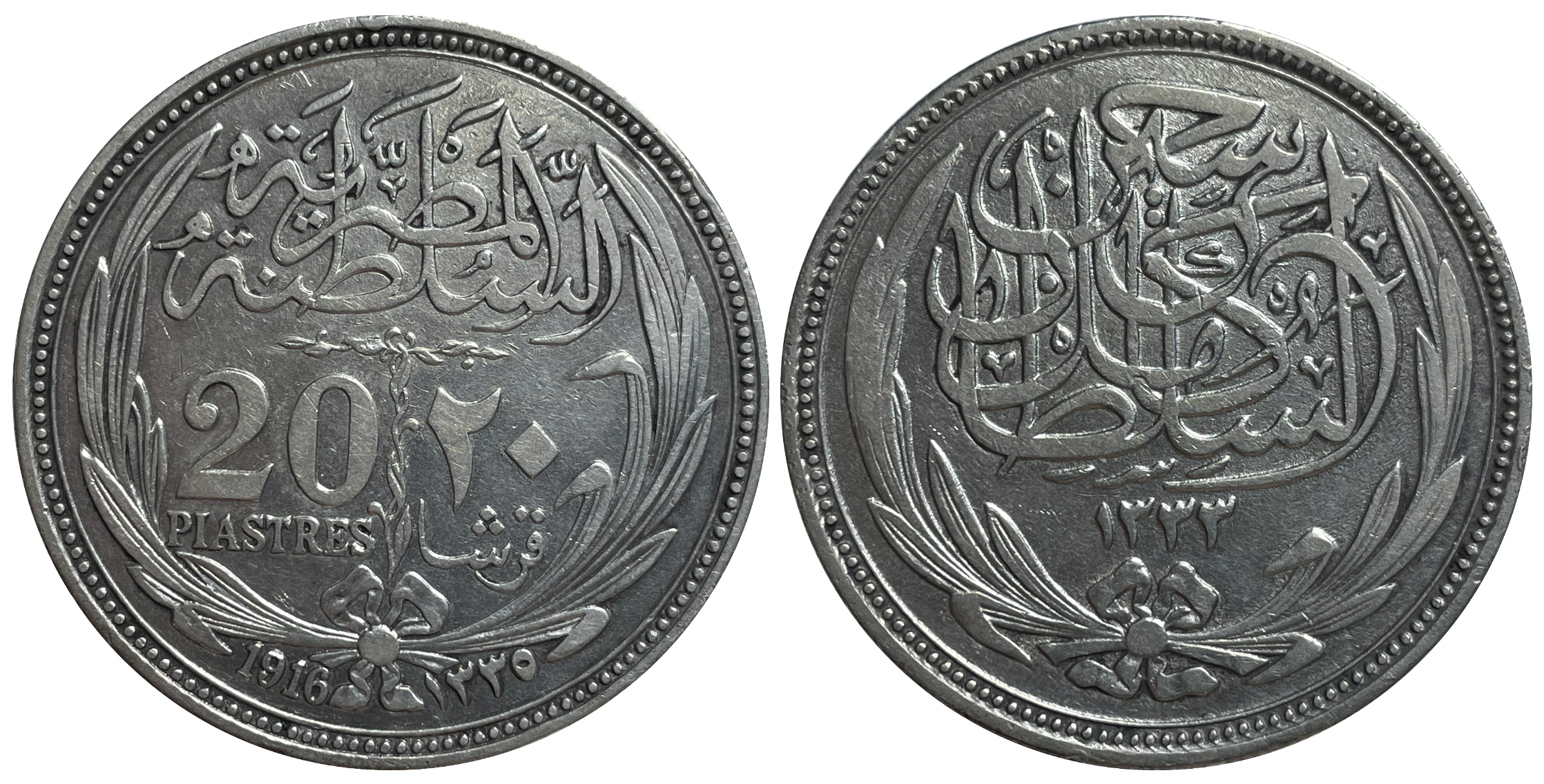
Silver coin: 20 qirsh of Sultanate of Egypt minted during the reign of Hussein Kamel - 1916 struck at Bombay Mint

Domestic

- Founder and Sovereign of the Order of Muhammad Ali
- Founder and Sovereign of the Order of Ismail
- Founder and Sovereign of the Order of the Nile
- Founder and Sovereign of the Order of the Virtues

Foreign

- Ottoman Empire: Order of Osmanieh, 1st Class
- Ottoman Empire: Order of the Medjidie, 1st Class
- Austria-Hungary: Grand Cross of the Order of Franz Joseph, 1869
- Sweden: Commander Grand Cross of the Order of the Sword, 1891
- United Kingdom of Great Britain and Ireland: Honorary Grand Cross of the Order of the Bath (civil division), 19 December 1914
- French Third Republic: Grand Cross of the Legion d'Honneur, 1916
- Kingdom of Italy: Grand Cross of the Order of Saints Maurice and Lazarus, 1916
- Greece: Grand Cross of the Order of the Redeemer, 1916
- Kingdom of Romania: Grand Cross of the Order of the Crown, 1916
- Belgium: Grand Cross of the Order of Leopold II, 1917

Hussein Kamel of Egypt Muhammad Ali Dynasty Born: 21 November 1853 Died: 9 October 1917
Regnal titles
Preceded by Abbas Hilmi II as Khedive of Egypt and Sudan	Sultan of Egypt and the Sudan; 19 December 1914 – 9 October 1917	Succeeded by Fuad I
Recreated Title last held by Tuman Bay II	Sultan of Egypt and the Sudan; 19 December 1914 – 9 October 1917	Succeeded by Fuad I
Political offices
Preceded by Ali Mubarak Pasha	Minister of Public Works; 26 August 1872 – 7 September 1875	Succeeded by Ibrahim Yakan Pasha
Preceded by Abdel Hamid Sadeq Pasha	Speaker of the Legislative Council; 30 January 1909 – 3 March 1910	Succeeded by Mahmoud Fahmi Pasha
Preceded by Mehmed V as Ottoman Suzerain	Head of state of Egypt; 19 December 1914 – 9 October 1917	Succeeded by Fuad I
