= Khedive =

Honorific title for sultans and grand viziers of the Ottoman Empire

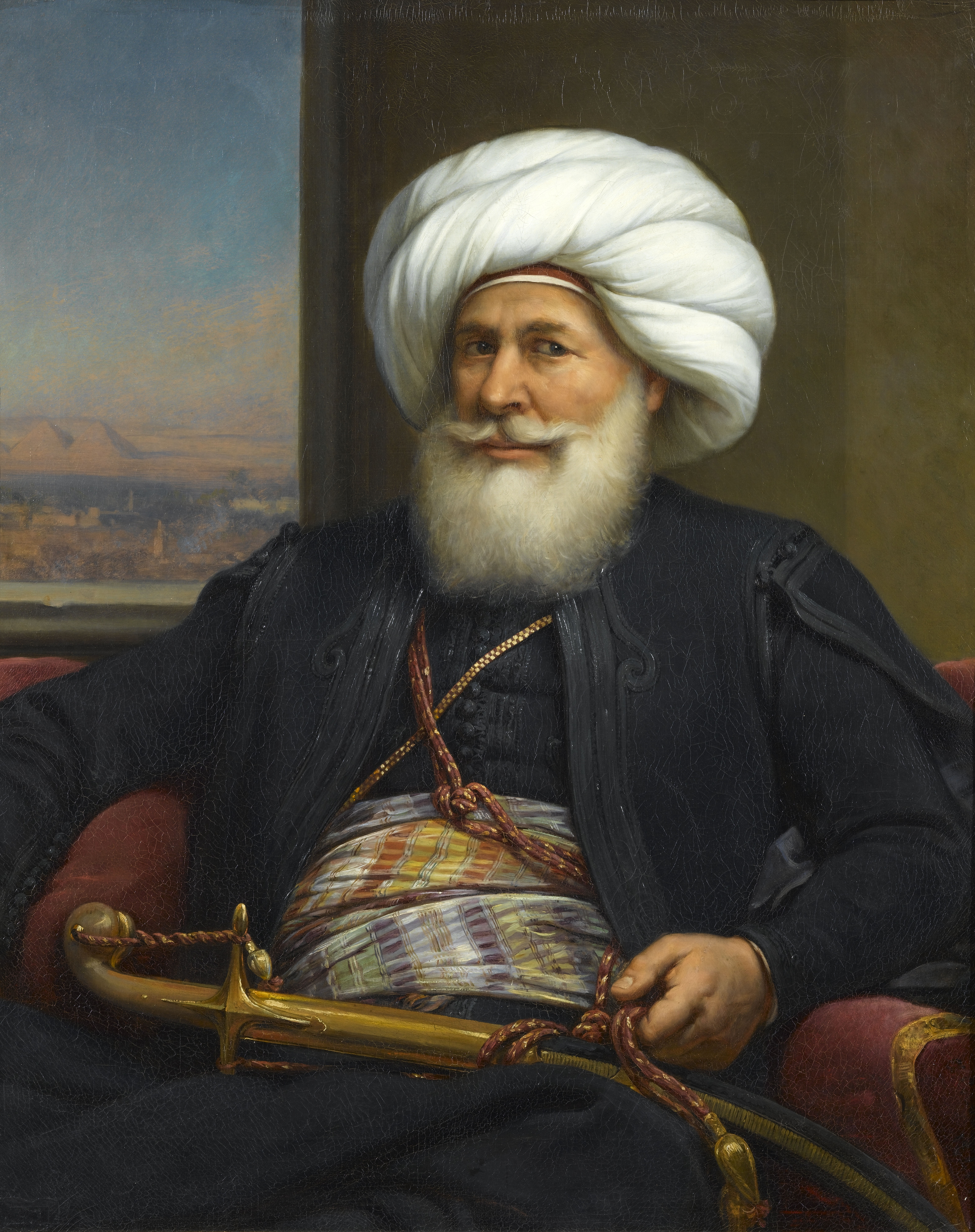
Muhammad Ali Pasha

Khedive (/kəˈdiːv/ kə-DEEV; Ottoman Turkish: خدیو, romanized: hidiv; Arabic: خديوي, romanized: khudaywī) was an honorific title of Classical Persian origin used for the sultans and grand viziers of the Ottoman Empire, but most famously for the viceroy of Egypt from 1805 to 1914.

It is attested in Persian poetry from the 10th century and was used as an Ottoman honorific from the 16th. It was borrowed into Ottoman Turkish directly from Persian. It was first used in Egypt, without official recognition, by Muhammad Ali Pasha, the ethnically Albanian governor of Ottoman Egypt and Turco-Egyptian Sudan from 1805 to 1848. The initially self-declared title was officially recognized by the Ottoman government in 1867 and used subsequently by Isma'il Pasha of Egypt and his dynastic successors until 1914. The term entered Arabic in Egypt in the 1850s.

== Etymology ==
This title is recorded in English since 1867, borrowed from French khédive, in turn from Ottoman Turkish خدیو hıdiv, from Classical Persian خدیو khidēv ("lord").

== Egypt in the 19th and early 20th centuries ==
=== Wilāyah (1805–1867) ===
Following the 1798 French invasion of Egypt and Napoleon's defeat of Egyptian forces, which consisted largely of the ruling Mamluk military caste, the Ottoman Empire dispatched troops from Rumelia (the Balkan provinces of the Ottoman Empire) under the command of Muhammad Ali Pasha to restore the Empire's authority in what had hitherto been an Ottoman province. However, upon the French defeat and departure, Muhammad Ali seized control of the country and declared himself ruler of Egypt, quickly consolidating an independent local powerbase. After repeated failed attempts to remove and kill him, in 1805, the Sublime Porte officially recognized Muhammad Ali as Pasha and Wāli (Governor) of Egypt. However, demonstrating his grander ambitions, he claimed for himself the higher title of Khedive, as did his successors, Abbas I, Sa'id I and Ibrahim Pasha.

=== Khedivate (1867–1914) ===
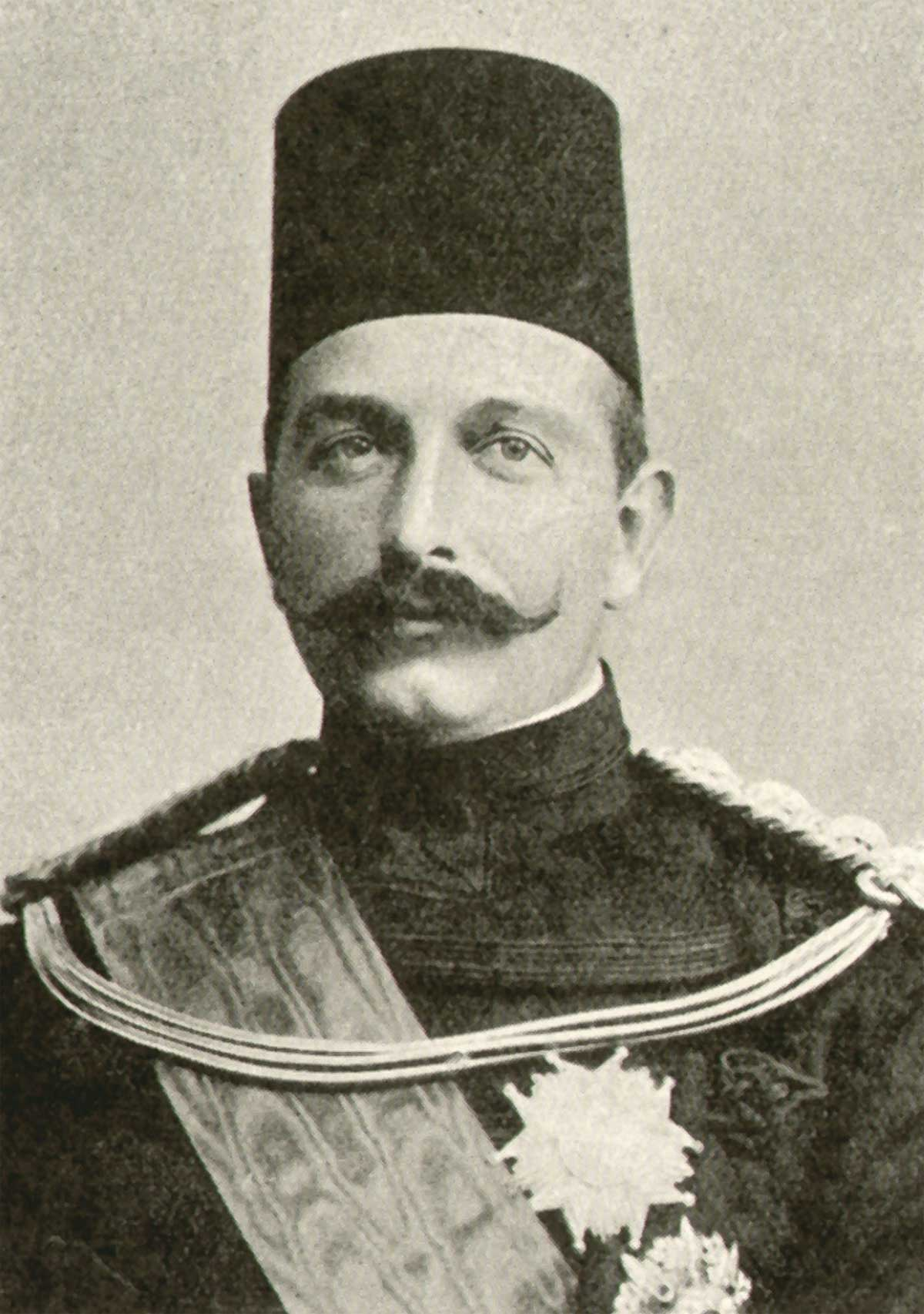
Abbas Hilmi Pasha, the last Khedive

The Muhammad Ali dynasty's use of the title Khedive was not sanctioned by the Ottoman Empire until 1867 when Sultan Abdülaziz officially recognized it as the title of Ismail Pasha. Moreover, the Porte accepted Ismail's alteration of the royal line of succession to go from father to son, rather than brother to brother, as was the tradition in the Ottoman Empire, and Arab dynasties. In May 1879, the United Kingdom and France began pressuring the Ottoman Sultan Abdülhamid II to depose Ismail Pasha, and this was done on June 26, 1879. The more pliable Tewfik Pasha, Ismail's son, was made his successor as the new Khedive. Ismail Pasha left Egypt and initially went into exile to Naples, but was eventually permitted by Sultan Abdülhamid II to retire to his Palace of Emirgan on the Bosphorus in Constantinople. There he remained, more or less a state prisoner, until his death. He was later buried in Cairo.

After the nationalist Urabi Revolt of 1882, Britain invaded Egypt in support of Tewfik Pasha, and established an occupation over the country. During this period, the Muhammad Ali Dynasty under Tewfik Pasha and his son Abbas II continued to rule Egypt and Sudan using the title Khedive, whilst still under nominal (de jure) Ottoman sovereignty until 1914.

Abbas II of Egypt was deposed by the British in 1914, and Egypt was declared a protectorate of Britain, the Sultanate of Egypt, which was ruled by Abbas's uncle Hussein Kamel under the title of Sultan.

Regnal titles
Preceded by Wāli	Style of the Egyptian sovereign 1867–1914	Succeeded by Sultan of Egypt
