= List of Albanians in Egypt =

This is a list that includes both Egyptian people of Albanian descent and Albanian immigrants that have resided in Egypt. The list is sorted by the fields or occupations in which the notable individual has maintained the most influence.

== Monarchs and sultans ==
- Muhammad Ali of Egypt – Ottoman Albanian commander in the Ottoman army, who rose to the rank of Pasha, and became Wāli, and self-declared Khedive of Egypt and Sudan
- Ibrahim Pasha of Egypt – Eldest son of Muhammad Ali, the Wāli and unrecognised Khedive of Egypt and Sudan
- Abbas I of Egypt – Wāli of Egypt and Sudan
- Sa'id of Egypt – Wāli of Egypt and Sudan from 1854 until 1863
- Isma'il Pasha – Khedive of Egypt and Sudan from 1863 to 1879
- Tewfik Pasha – Khedive of Egypt and the Sudan between 1879 and 1892 and the sixth ruler from the Muhammad Ali Dynasty
- Hussein Kamel of Egypt – Sultan of Egypt from 19 December 1914 to 9 October 1917
- Fuad I of Egypt – Sultan and later King of Egypt and Sudan
- Abbas Helmi II of Egypt – Khedive of Egypt and Sudan
- Hussein Kamel of Egypt – Sultan of Egypt
- Mohammed Ali Tewfik – Heir presumptive of Egypt and Sudan from 1892 to 1899 and 1936 to 1952
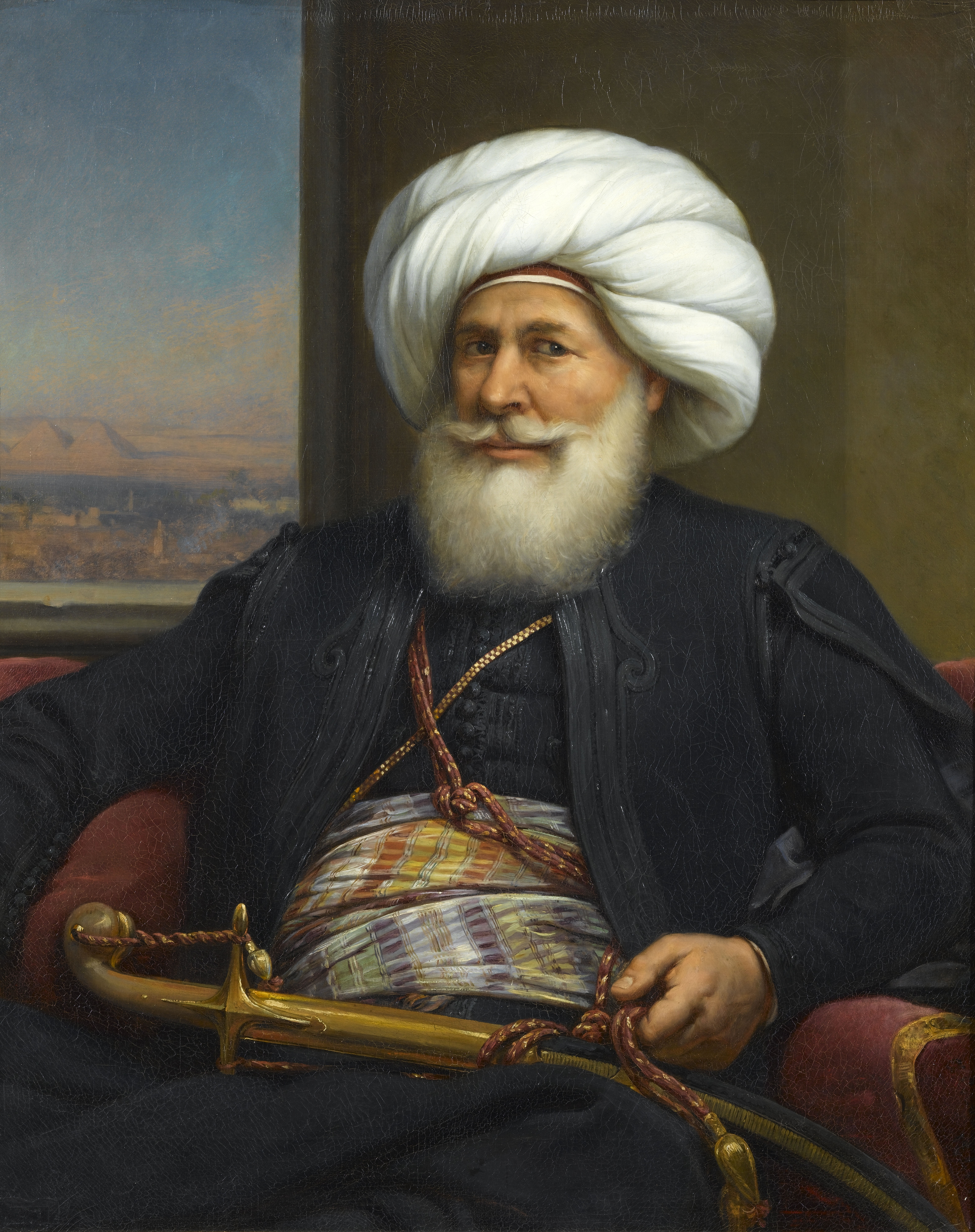
Muhammad Ali of Egypt

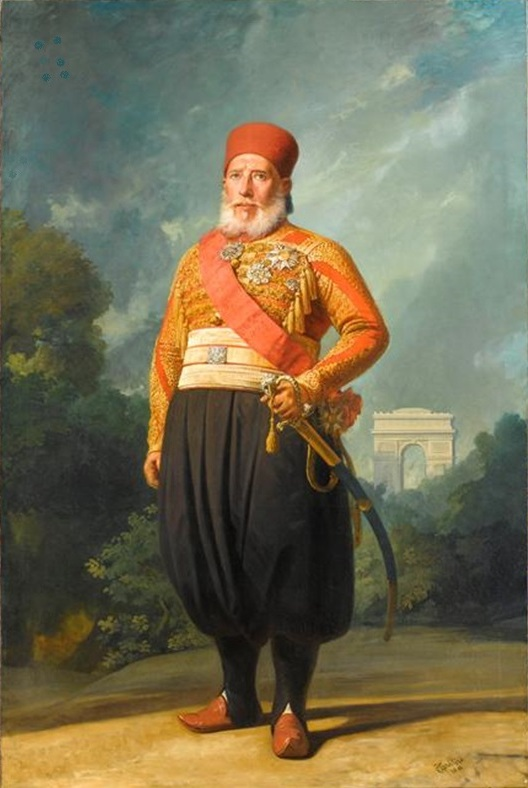
Ibrahim Pasha of Egypt

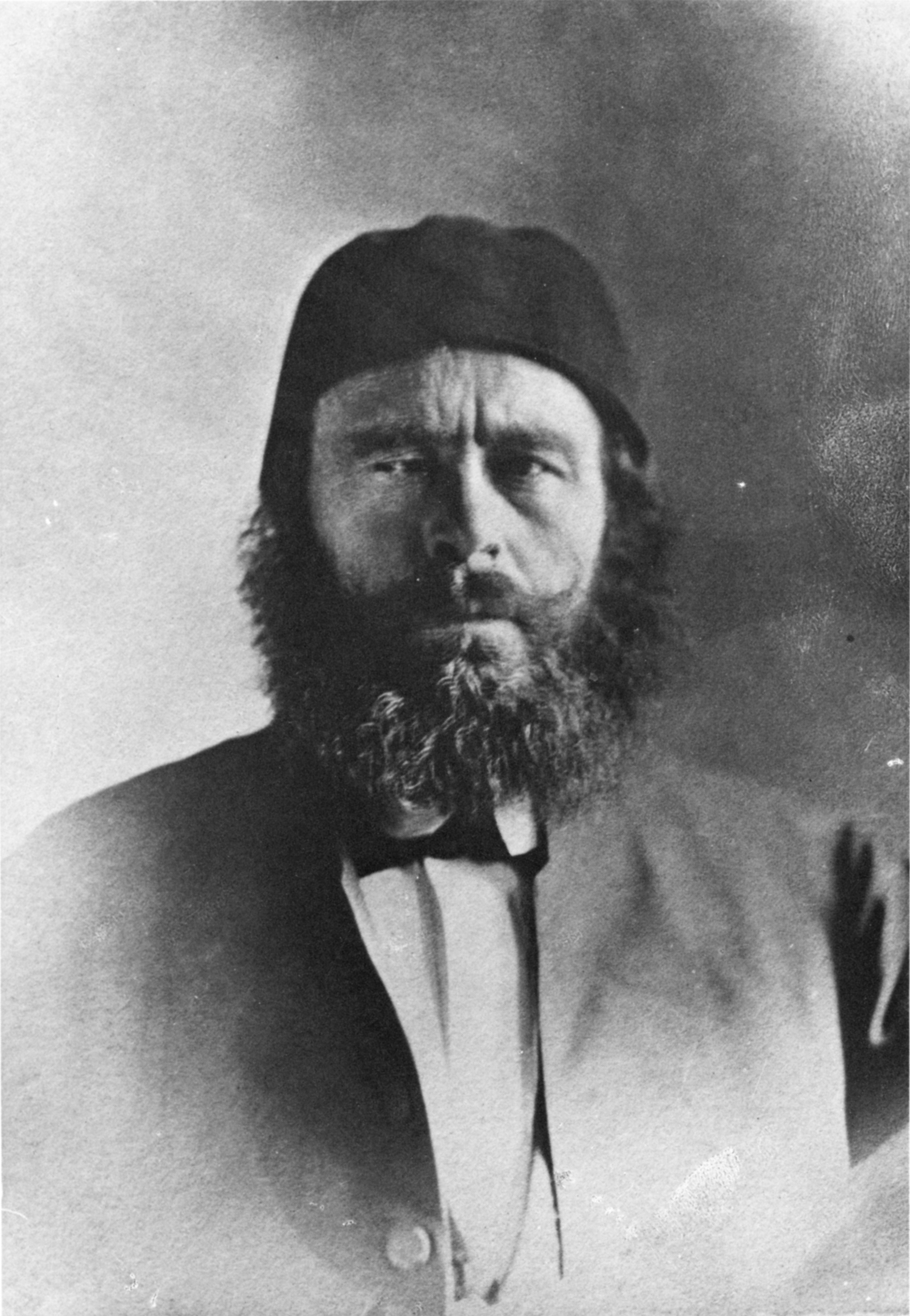
Sa'id of Egypt

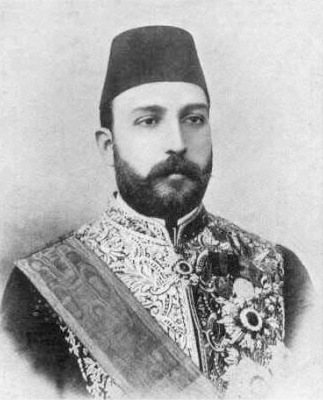
Tewfik Pasha

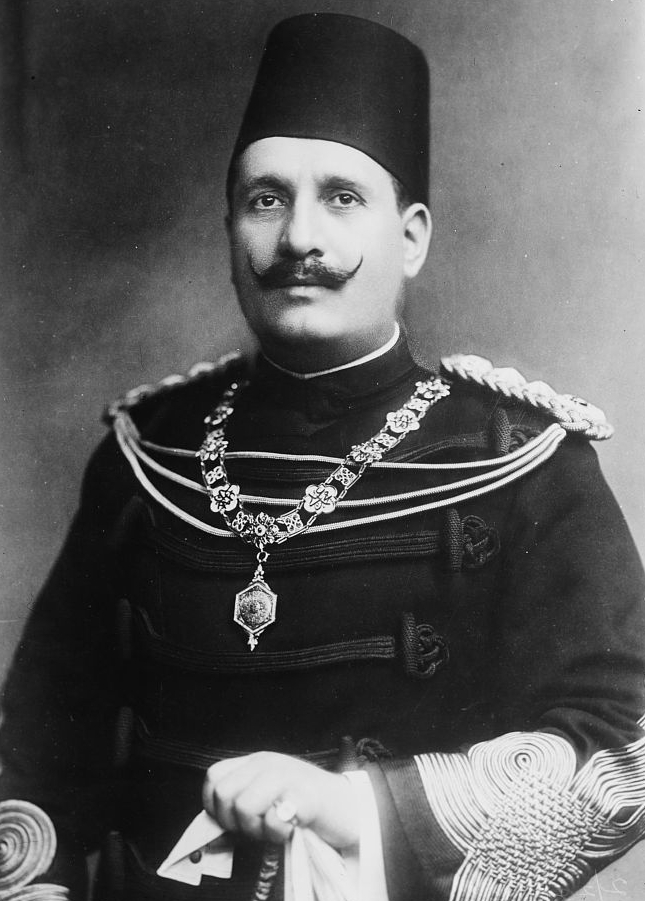
Fuad I of Egypt

== Kings ==
- Farouk of Egypt – Tenth ruler of Egypt from the Muhammad Ali dynasty and the penultimate King of Egypt and the Sudan
- Fuad II of Egypt – Member of the Egyptian Muhammad Ali dynasty
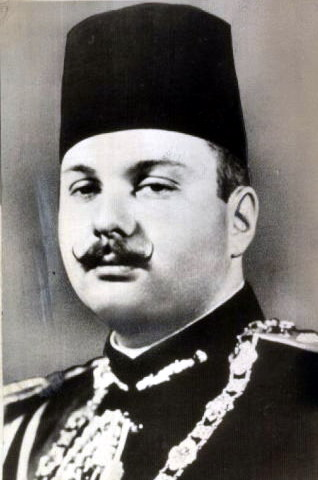
Farouk of Egypt

== Prime Ministers ==
- Said Halim Pasha – Ottoman statesman of Tosk origin who served as Grand Vizier of the Ottoman Empire from 1913 to 1917
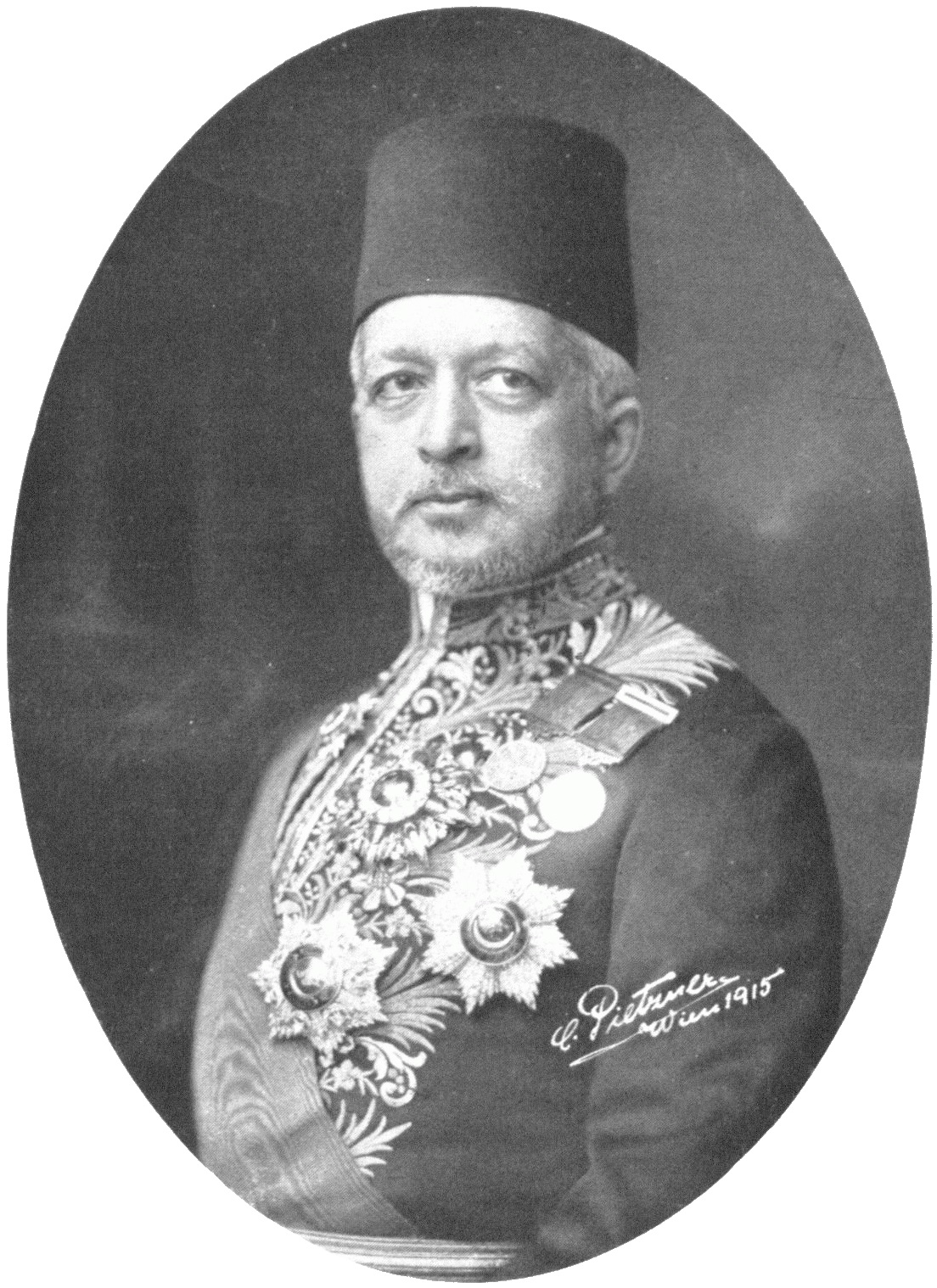
Said Halim Pasha

== Princes ==
- Prince Kamal el Dine Hussein – The son of Sultan Hussein Kamel of Egypt
- Mohamed Abdel Moneim – Egyptian prince and former heir apparent to the throne of Egypt and Sudan from 1899 to 1914
- Muhammad Ali, Prince of the Sa'id – Heir apparent to the abolished thrones of Egypt and Sudan
- Prince Omar Toussoun – Member of the Muhammad Ali Dynasty of Egypt.
- Ahmad Rifaat Pasha – Member of the Muhammad Ali Dynasty of Egypt. He was heir presumptive to Sa'id Pasha
- Hassan Aziz Hassan – Egyptian prince
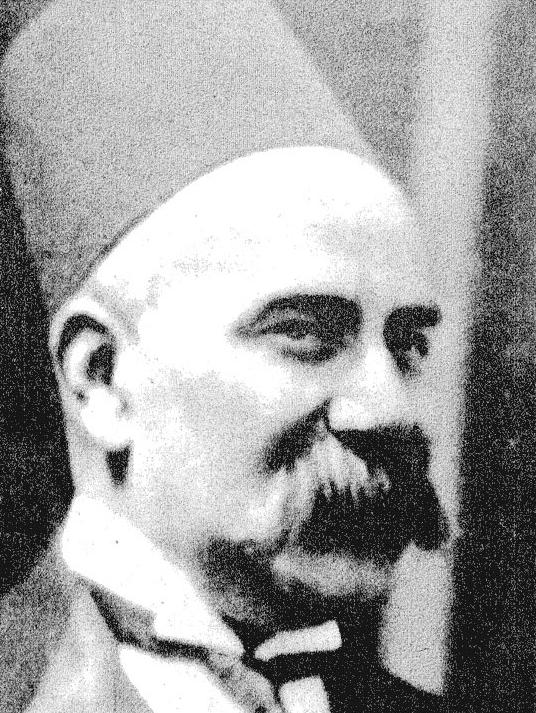
Prince Kamal el Dine Hussein

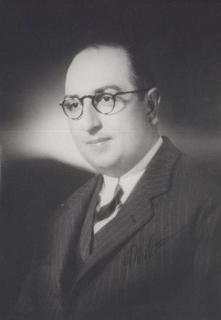
Muhammad Abdel Moneim

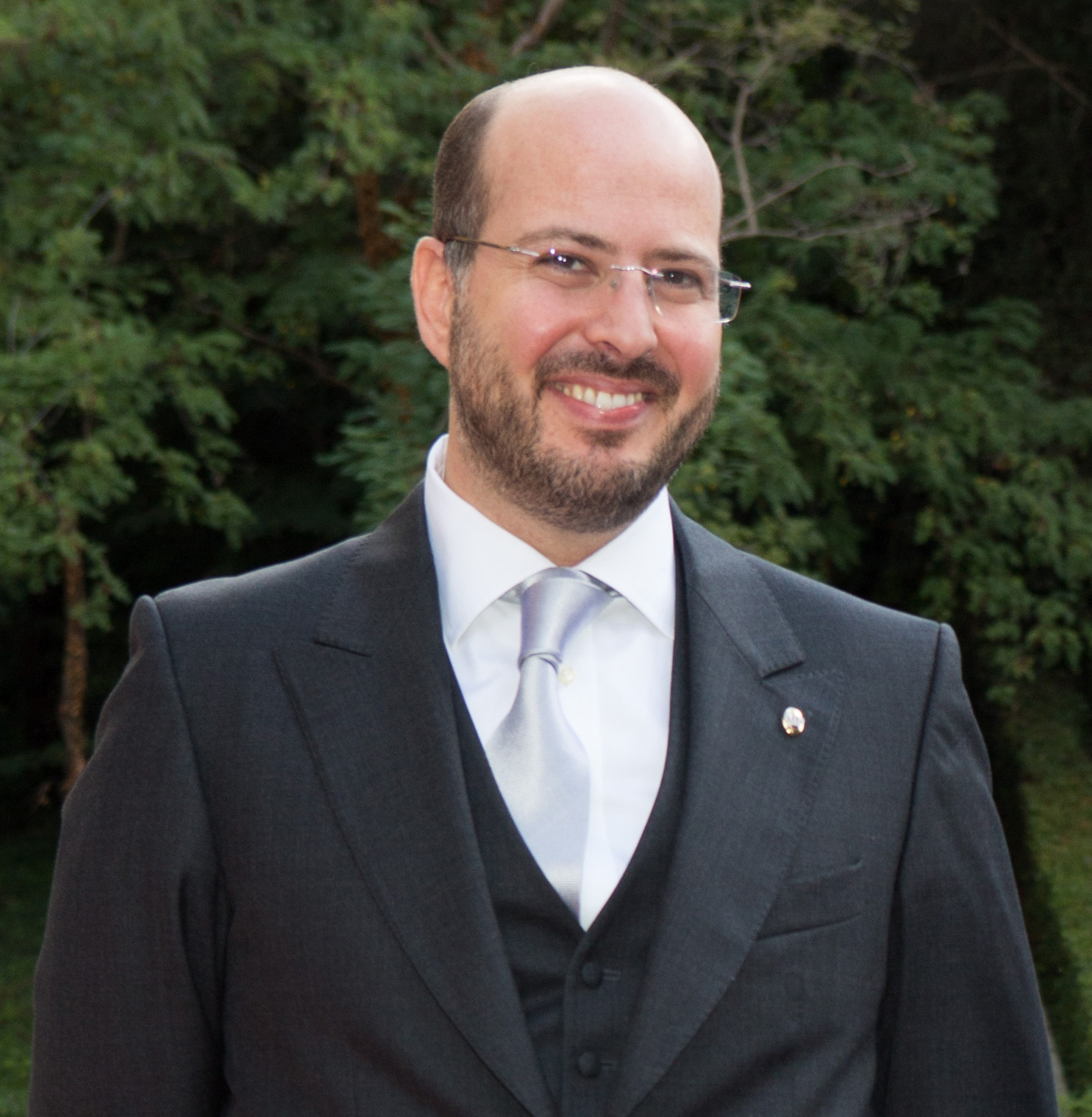
Muhammad Ali, Prince of the Sa'id

== Princesses ==
- Fawzia Fuad of Egypt – Egyptian princess who became Queen of Iran
- Princess Farial of Egypt – Eldest child of Egypt's penultimate monarch, King Farouk
- Faika of Egypt – Egyptian royal and a member of the Mohammad Ali Dynasty
- Princess Fawzia Farouk of Egypt – Second daughter of King Farouk I of Egypt from his first wife Queen Farida
- Princess Fadia of Egypt – Daughter of the late King Farouk of Egypt
- Faiza Rauf – Egyptian princess and a member of the Muhammad Ali Dynasty
- Princess Fawzia-Latifa of Egypt – Egyptian princess and daughter of Fuad II
- Fathia Ghali – Youngest daughter of Fuad I of Egypt and Nazli Sabri, and so the youngest sister of Farouk I
- Emina Ilhamy – Egyptian and Ottoman princess and a member of the Muhammad Ali Dynasty
- Zeynab Ilhamy – Egyptian and Ottoman princess
- Tevhide Ilhamy – Egyptian and Ottoman princess
- Shivakiar Ibrahim – Egyptian princess and a member of the Muhammad Ali Dynasty
- Shahnaz Pahlavi – First child of the Shah of Iran, Mohammad Reza Pahlavi, and his first wife, Princess Fawzia of Egypt
- Ayn-al-Hayat Rifaat – Egyptian princess and a member of the Muhammad Ali Dynasty
- Shafaq Nur Hanim – Princess consort of Khedive Isma'il Pasha
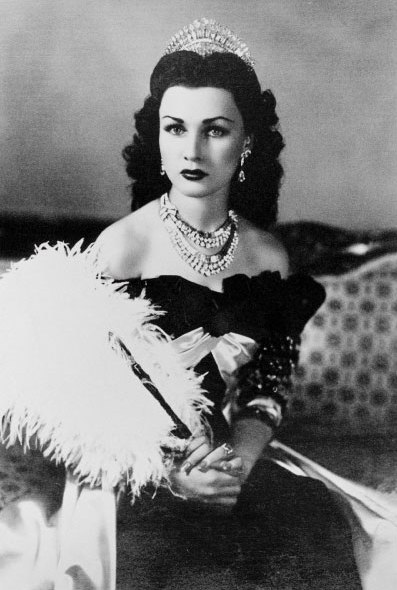
Fawzia Fuad of Egypt

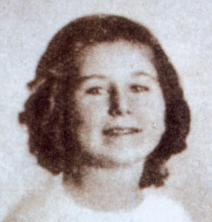
Fathia Ghali

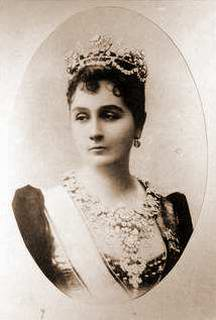
Emina Ilhamy

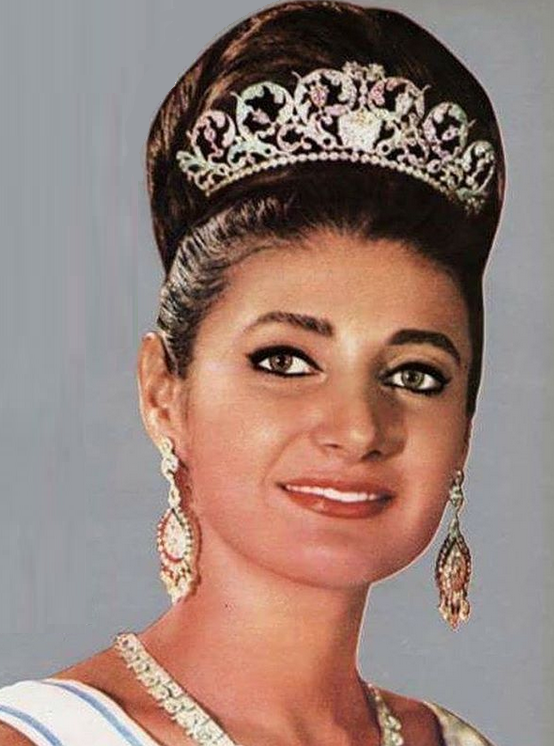
Shahnaz Pahlavi

== Politicians ==
- Aziz Ezzat Pasha – Egyptian Politician
- Adel Darwish – British political journalist, a veteran Fleet Street reporter, author, historian

== Military ==
- Abidin Bey – Albanian commander and politician of Egypt
- Tusun Pasha – Son of Muhammad Ali, wali of Egypt between 1805 and 1849
- Tahir Pasha – Albanian commander of bashi-bazouks under Koca Hüsrev Mehmed Pasha
- Ibrahim Ilhamy Pasha – Only surviving son of Abbas I of Egypt
- Ismail Chirine – He served as commander in chief of the Egyptian army
- Ahmad Ismail Ali – Egypt's army and minister of war during the October War of 1973
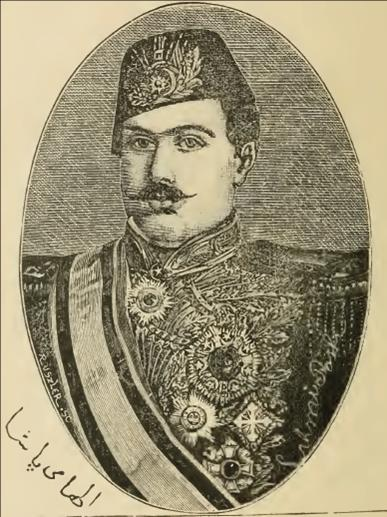
Ibrahim Ilhami Pasha

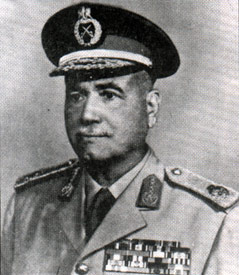
Ahmad Ismail Ali

== Business and finance ==
- Prince Abbas Hilmi – Egyptian and Imperial Ottoman prince and financial manager. In 2006, he founded the Friends of Manial Palace Museum Association, which seeks to preserve the palace of his granduncle Prince Muhammad Ali.

== Musicians ==
- Tefta Tashko-Koço – Well-known Albanian singer of the 1930s
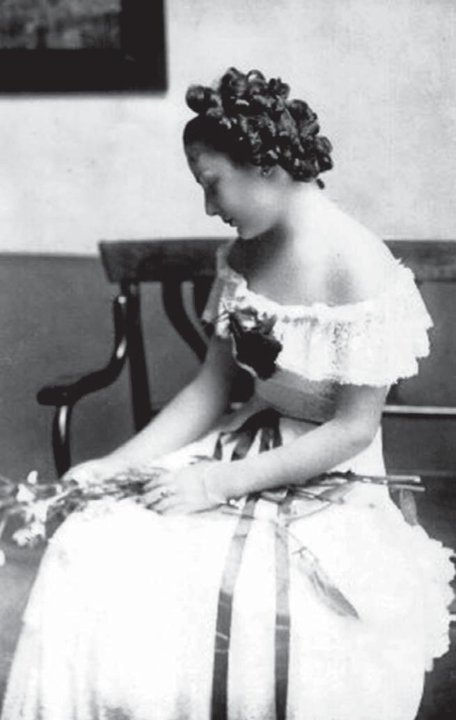
Tefta Tashko-Koço

== Writers ==
- Filip Shiroka - Albanian poet and writer who lived and worked in Egypt for a while.
- Ismail Joubert – South African and Egyptian poet and writer.
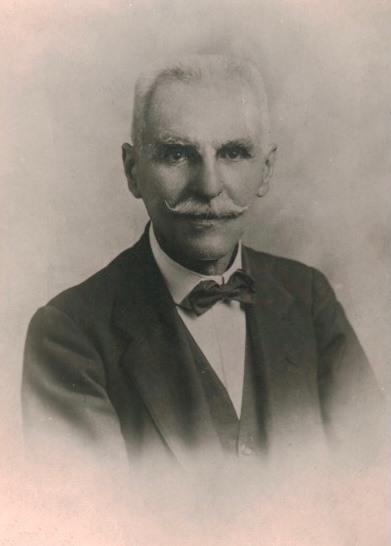
Filip Shiroka
