= List of consorts of the Muhammad Ali dynasty =

This is a list of consorts of modern Egypt, the wives of the monarchs of the Muhammad Ali Dynasty who reigned over Egypt from 1805 to 1953. The Dynasty's rule came to end with the declaration of the Republic of Egypt on 18 June 1953, 11 months after the Egyptian Revolution of 1952. The wives of the Egyptian pretenders are titular queens.

Before Tewfik Pasha Egyptian rulers had harem (which means have more than one wife and several concubines). Women had two statuses in the harem of the Muhammad Ali dynasty. First are the legal wives with the title of Khanum (Hanim). Only four women can have this title at the same time. The second are concubines with the title of Kadin. They can later be raised to Khanum. There can virtually be an unlimited number of women who can enter the harem with this title. Women mentioned in the list are mainly with the title of Khanum.

== Consorts of Egypt ==
Picture	Name	Father	Birth	Marriage	Became Consort	Ceased to be Consort	Death	Spouse
=== Wali consort of Egypt (self-declared as Khedives) ===
	Amina	Nusratli Ali Agha	1770	1787	1808 (after her return from Istanbul)	1824 (her death)	1824	Muhammad Ali
	Ayn al-Hayat					1848 (husband's abdication)	1849	Muhammad Ali
	Mah-Duran					1848 (husband's abdication)	1880	Muhammad Ali
	Shams uz-Zafar					1846 (her death)	1846	Muhammad Ali
	Shams-i-Nur					1848 (husband's abdication)	1863	Muhammad Ali
	Gulizar				2 March 1848 (husband's accession)	10 November 1848 (husband's death)	19 October 1865	Ibrahim Pasha
	Hoshiyar				2 March 1848 (husband's accession)	10 November 1848 (husband's death)	21 June 1886	Ibrahim Pasha
	Sa’arit				2 March 1848 (husband's accession)	10 November 1848 (husband's death)	17 January 1870	Ibrahim Pasha
	Ulfat		1815		2 March 1848 (husband's accession)	10 November 1848 (husband's death)	2 March 1865	Ibrahim Pasha
	Mahivech				11 November 1848 (husband's accession)	13 July 1854 (husband's death)	13 November 1889	Abbas Helmy I
	Piralanat				11 November 1848 (husband's accession)	13 July 1854 (husband's death)	1 November 1892	Abbas Helmy I
	Inji (Princess Sa’id)			1845	14 July 1854 (husband's accession)	17 January 1863 (husband's death)	5 September 1890	Mohamed Sa'id
	Melek-ber				14 July 1854 (husband's accession)	17 January 1863 (husband's death)	October 1890	Mohamed Sa'id
=== Princess consort of Egypt ===
	Shehret Feza			1849	19 January 1863 husband's accession	25 June 1879 husband's forced removal	1890	Isma'il Pasha
	Jananiyar		1827	1857	19 January 1863 husband's accession	25 June 1879 husband's forced removal	12 December 1912	Isma'il Pasha
	Jesham Afet			1863		25 June 1879 husband's forced removal	1 November 1907	Isma'il Pasha
	Shafaq Nur			1866		25 June 1879 husband's forced removal	17 March 1884	Isma'il Pasha
=== Khediva consort of Egypt ===
	Emina Ilhamy	Ibrahim Ilhamy Pasha	24 May 1858	16 January 1873	25 June 1879 husband's accession	7 January 1892 husband's death	19 June 1931	Tewfik
	Ikbal	-	22 October 1876	19 February 1895		19 December 1914 husband's deposition	10 February 1941	Abbas II
	Zubeyda Javidan b. May Török de Szendrö	József Török de Szendrö	15 June 1877	1 March 1910		7 August 1913 divorce	5 August 1968	Abbas II
=== Sultana consort of Egypt ===
	Melek Tourhan	Hasan Tourhan Pasha	27 October 1869	12 March 1887	19 December 1914 husband's accession	9 October 1917 husband's death	4 February 1956	Hussein Kamel
	Nazli Sabri	Abdul Rahman Sabri Pasha	25 June 1894	26 May 1919		15 March 1922 became Queen	29 May 1978	Fuad I
=== Queen consort of Egypt ===
	Nazli Sabri	Abdul Rahman Sabri Pasha	25 June 1894	26 May 1919	15 March 1922 became Queen	28 April 1936 husband's death	29 May 1978	Fuad I
	Farida b. Safinaz Zulficar	Youssef Zulficar Pasha	5 September 1921	20 January 1938		19 November 1948 divorce	16 October 1988	Farouk
	Narriman Sadek	Hussain Fahmi Sadiq Bey	31 October 1933	6 May 1951		26 July 1952 husband's forced abdication	16 February 2005	Farouk

== See also ==
- List of ancient Egyptian royal consorts, for the ancient wives of the Pharaoh of Egypt
- List of monarchs of the Muhammad Ali Dynasty
- Muhammad Ali Dynasty
- Muhammad Ali Dynasty family tree
- History of Egypt under the Muhammad Ali dynasty
- History of Sudan under Muhammad Ali and his successors
