= Tevhide Ilhamy =

Egyptian princess

- Born: 1860; Istanbul, Ottoman Empire
- Died: 1882 (aged 21–22); Cairo, Egypt
- Spouse: Davut Fethi Pasha (m. 1880)
- Issue: Mustafa Davut Bey
- House: Muhammad Ali
- Father: Ibrahim Ilhami Pasha
- Mother: Ashiq Bayran Qadin
- Religion: Sunni Islam

Tevhide Ilhamy (Arabic: توحيدة إلهامي; Turkish: Tevhide Ilhami; 1860 – 1882) was an Egyptian princess and a member of the Muhammad Ali Dynasty.

== Life ==
Princess Tevhide Ilhamy was born 1860 in Istanbul. She was the youngest daughter of Lieutenant General Prince Ibrahim Ilhami Pasha, and his consort Ashiq Bayran Qadin (died 1878). She was the granddaughter of Khedive Abbas I and Mahivech Hanim. She had two sisters, Princess Emina Ilhamy and Princess Zeynab Ilhamy.

On 29 December 1880, she married Davut Fethi Pasha, a grandson of Mehmed Necib Pasha and had a son named Mustafa Davut Bey.

== Death ==
Tevhide died in Cairo, Egypt in 1882.
