= Hoshiyar Qadin =

Walida Pasha of Egypt
- Tenure: 19 January 1863 – 26 June 1879
- Predecessor: Bamba Qadin
- Successor: Shafaq Nur Hanim
- Died: 21 June 1886; Greater Qasar Ali Palace, Cairo, Khedivate of Egypt
- Burial: Khedival Mausoleum, Rifai Mosque, Cairo, Egypt
- Spouse: Ibrahim Pasha
- Issue: Isma'il Pasha
Names
- English: Hoshiyar Qadin; Arabic: خوشيار قادین
- House: Muhammad Ali (by marriage)
- Religion: Sunni Islam

Hoshiyar Qadin (Arabic: هوشيار قادین; died 21 June 1886) was a consort to Ibrahim Pasha and was Walida Pasha to their son Isma'il Pasha.

== Early life ==
Of Circassian or European origin, Hoshiyar Qadin was in good relationship with Pertevniyal Sultan, the mother of Ottoman Sultan Abdulaziz. Ibrahim had known Istanbul, since he was a hostage in the imperial capital 1806–1807. He may have met and fell in love with Hoshiyar later in Bebek.

She was brought to the harem of the Muhammad Ali dynasty and married Ibrahim Pasha, and gave birth to Isma'il Pasha on 31 December 1830. After the death of Sa'id Pasha, Isma'il was proclaimed Khedive on 19 January 1863, though the Ottoman Empire and the other Great Powers recognized him only as Wāli, and Hoshiyar became the Walida Pasha.

== As Walida Pasha ==
Hoshiyar Qadin was a public figure whose doings were continually reported by the press, which referred to her simply as Queen Mother. During the 'Urabi revolt her patriotic feelings made her accept 'Urabi as the defender of the country against a British invasion. Putting aside all personal interests and the fact that he was also a menace to the dynasty, she provided him with money and horses and worked with other ladies of the family at preparing bandages and medicine for the wounded.

She wielded considerable influence over her son. When the Sultan Abdulaziz visited Egypt, he honoured Hoshiar by bestowing on her the Grand Cordon of the Osmaniyeh. She is described in contemporary sources as a strict and disciplined parent. During a childhood visit to Europe, the future Khedive reportedly remarked of the Dowager Empress of Austria, who had shown him kindness, "that no one in his own family had ever shown him as much affection."

Hoshiyar lived in the palace of Qasar al-Ali, now part of the residential district of Garden City. There she did not condescend to leave her home for anyone else's, no matter how high ranking that person may have been. As Ibrahim Pasha's widow and Khedive's mother, her position was unique.

Hoshiyar was a pivotal political figure, and one of the few people whom Isma'il trusted. She didn't express her opinion directly in politics. Instead she operated through family members and agents, such as the director of estates, the powerful and cruel chief eunuch, Khalil Agha. After his death in 1880, Ibrahim Edhem took his place as the main agent.

She and Isma'il launched a propaganda campaign in Istanbul. In February 1863, Pertevniyal arranged for Isma'il to meet Abdulaziz in private in her palace. In summer of 1864, Hoshiyar traveled to Istanbul, to help her son. She arrived with proposed new heir in question, her grandson Tewfik Pasha, lots of money, and female diplomacy. In spring of 1866, they launched the greatest attack, in which the good offices of Pertevniyal may have been involved. In September 1867, Hoshiyar threw a dinner at her own palace in the shores of the Bosphorus in honour of Pertevniyal. Pertevniyal returned the hospitality with an invitation of Hoshiyar to the Dolmabahçe Palace.

Her court al-Walida Pasha (the Khedive's mother), was said to be larger and more prominent than that of any of his wives. Zevat culture was her and Isma'il's private world. She had an Ottoman culture in her palace, where thousand of slave girls served in her residence in Istanbul. She also possessed a musical troop of slave girls, who performed Ottoman music. Isma'il could talk to her in Turkish or in her Circassian language, and in her palace he was often entertained by Ottoman music.

In 1869, she met with the Princess of Wales Alexandra of Denmark, when the latter visited Cairo with her husband Prince of Wales Edward (future Edward VII). The princess had visited Hoshiyar, and dined with Isma'il's wives in the harem.

== Death ==
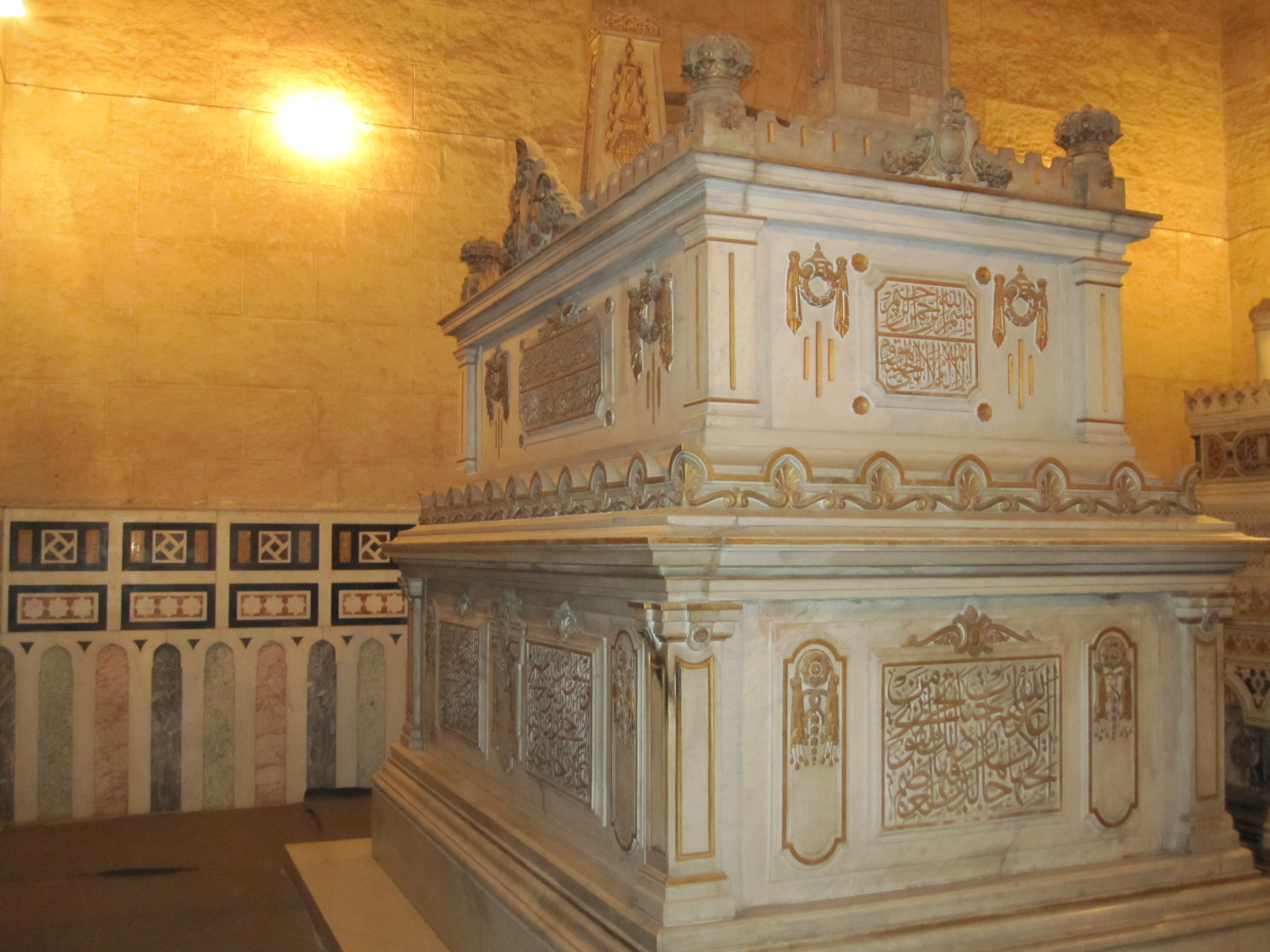
Tomb of Hoshiyar Qadin

Hoshiyar Qadin died at the Greater Qasar al-Ali Palace, Cairo, on 21 June 1886, and was buried there at the Khedival Mausoleum, Al-Rifa'i Mosque, which was built on her orders.

== Honours ==
Foreign honours

- Ottoman Empire: Order of Osmanieh, 1st Class, 8 April 1863
- Ottoman Empire: Decoration of the Order of Charity, 1st class, 27 September 1878

== In popular culture ==
- In the Egyptian historical series Helwani Gate, Hoshiyar is portrayed by Egyptian actress Laila Fawzi.
- In the 2014 Egyptian historical drama series Saraya Abdeen, Hoshiyar is portrayed by Egyptian actress Yousra.

== See also ==
- List of kidnappings
- Muhammad Ali Dynasty family tree

== Sources ==
- Mestyan, Adam (2020). Arab Patriotism: The Ideology and Culture of Power in Late Ottoman Egypt. Princeton, NJ; Oxford: Princeton University Press. ISBN 978-0-691-20901-2.

Egyptian royalty
Preceded by Bamba Qadin	Walida Pasha of Egypt; 18 December 1863 – 26 June 1879	Succeeded by Shafaq Nur Hanim
