= Zeynab Ilhamy =

- Born: 29 December 1859; Istanbul, Ottoman Empire
- Died: 17 May 1918 (aged 58); Cairo, Egypt
- Burial: Hosh al-Basha, Imam al-Shafi'i, Cairo, Egypt
- Spouse: Mahmud Hamdi Pasha (m. 1878)
- Issue: Munira Hamdi
- House: Muhammad Ali
- Father: Ibrahim Ilhami Pasha
- Mother: Jeshmi Ahu Qadin
- Religion: Sunni Islam

Zeynab Ilhamy (Arabic: زينب إلهامي; Turkish: Zeynep Ilhami; 29 December 1859 – 17 May 1918) was an Egyptian princess and a member of the Muhammad Ali Dynasty and Ottoman dynasty.

== Life ==
Princess Zeynab Ilhamy was born on 29 December 1859 in Istanbul. She was the second daughter of Lieutenant General Prince Ibrahim Ilhami Pasha. and Jeshmi Ahu Qadin (died 1905). She was the granddaughter of Khedive Abbas I and Mahivech Hanim. She had two sisters, Princess Emina Ilhamy and Princess Tevhide Ilhamy.

In 1878, Zeynab married her father's cousin Prince Mahmud Hamdi Pasha fifth son of Isma'il Pasha and Jahan Shah Qadin. The couple had one daughter, who was named Princess Munira Hamdi, born in 1884. The two divorced in 1888.

== Death ==
Zeynab died at Cairo on 17 May 1918, and was buried Hosh al-Basha, Imam al-Shafi'i, Cairo.

== Issue ==
Zeynab and Mahmud Hamdi had one daughter:

- Princess Munira Hamdi (18 July 1884, Cairo — 18 November 1944 - Cairo), married Mohamed Tawfik Naseem Pasha;

== Ancestry ==
Ancestors of Zeynab Ilhamy

16. Muhammad Ali of Egypt
8. Tusun Pasha
17. Amina Hanim
4. Abbas I of Egypt
9. Bamba Qadin
2. Ibrahim Ilhamy Pasha
5. Mahivech Hanim
1. Zeynab Ilhamy
3. Jeshmi Ahu Qadin
