= Emina Ilhamy =

Wife of Khedive Tewfik Pasha and mother of Abbas II (1858-1931)

Emina of Ilhamy
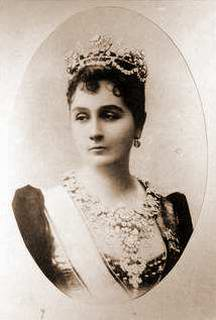
- Emina in the late 19th-century

Khediva consort of Egypt
- Tenure: 25 June 1879 – 7 January 1892

Khediva Mother of Egypt
- Tenure: 8 January 1892 – 19 December 1914
- Predecessor: Shafaq Nur Hanim
- Successor: Nur Felek Sultan (as Sultana Mother)
- Born: 24 May 1858; Constantinople (now Istanbul), Ottoman Empire
- Died: 19 June 1931 (aged 73); Bebek, Bosphorus, Istanbul, Turkey
- Burial: Qubbat Afandina, Khedive Tawfik Mausoleum, Kait Bey, Cairo, Egypt
- Spouse: Tewfik, Khedive of Egypt (m. 1873; died 1892)
- Issue: Abbas Hilmi II of Egypt; Prince Muhammad Ali Tewfik Pasha; Princess Nazli Hanim; Princess Khadija Hanim; Princess Nimetullah Hanim
Names
- Arabic: امینه الهامی; Turkish: Emine İlhami
- House: Alawiyya
- Father: Ibrahim Ilhami Pasha
- Mother: Nasrin Qadin
- Religion: Sunni Islam

Emina Ilhamy (Arabic: امینه الهامی; Turkish: Emine İlhami; 24 May 1858 – 19 June 1931) also Amina Ilhami, was an Egyptian princess and a member of the Muhammad Ali Dynasty. She was the first Khediva of Egypt from 1879 to 1892, as the wife of Khedive Tewfik Pasha. After the death of Khedive Tewfik, she was the Walida Pasha to their son Khedive Abbas Hilmi II from 1892 to 1914.

== Early life ==
Princess Emina Ilhamy was born on 24 May 1858 in Constantinople (now Istanbul). She was the eldest daughter of Prince Ibrahim Ilhami Pasha and his consort Nasrin Qadin (died 1871). She had two sisters, Princess Zeynab Ilhamy and Princess Tevhide Ilhamy. Princess Zeynab married Mahmud Hamdi Pasha, fifth son of Isma'il Pasha and Jihan Shah Qadin. She was the granddaughter of Abbas I and Mahivech Hanim.

== Marriage ==
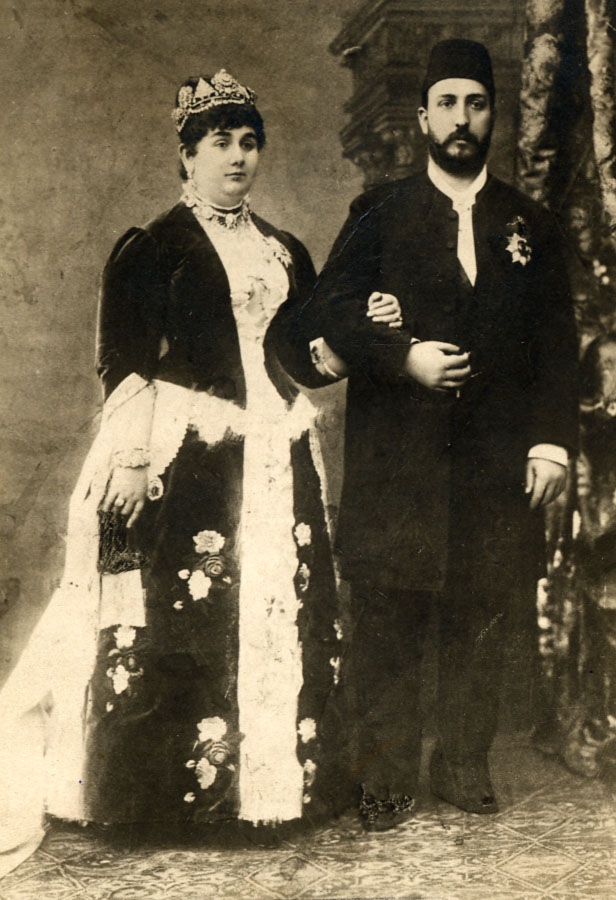
Tewfik Pasha and Emina Ilhamy after their wedding

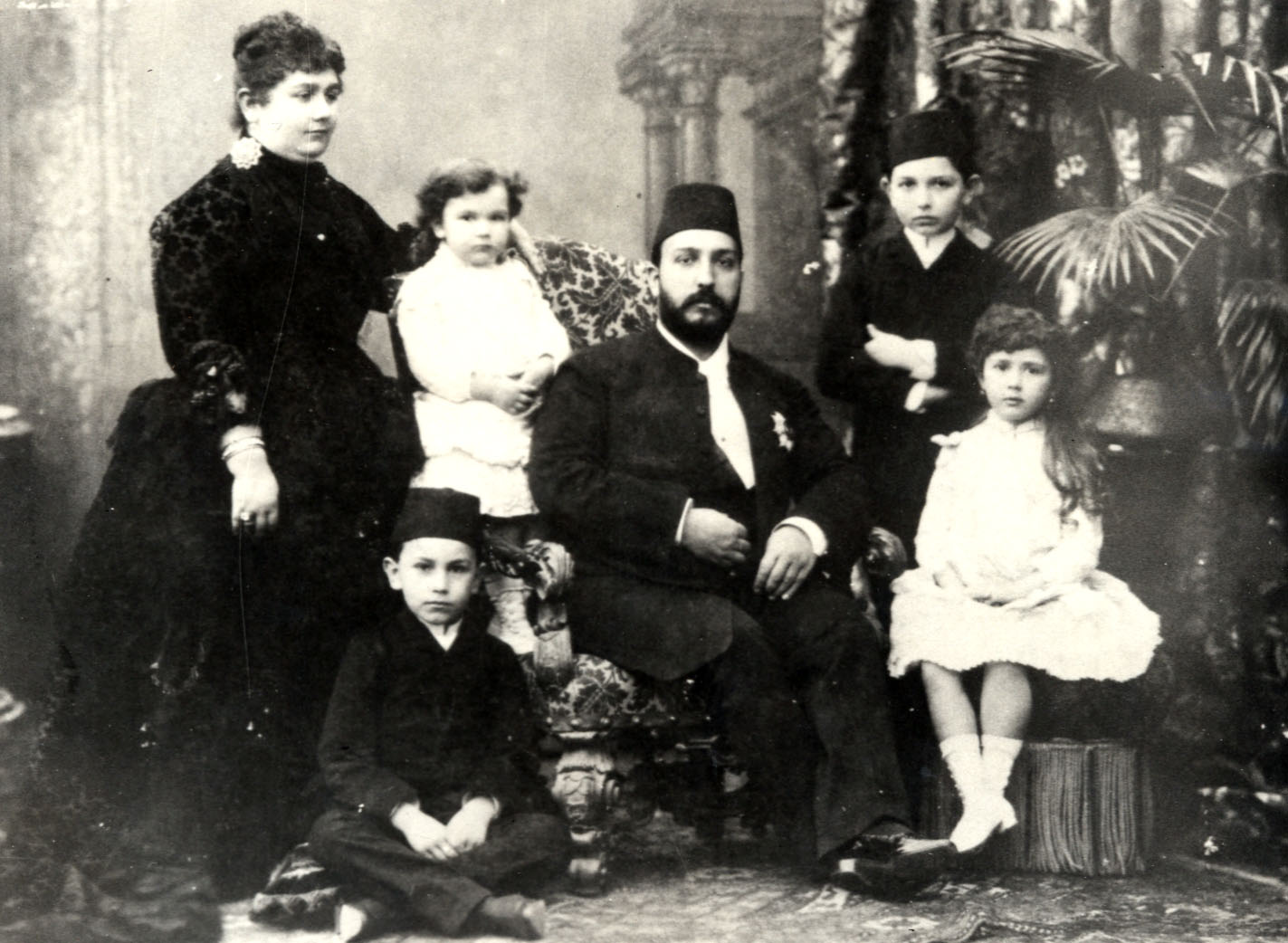
Princess Emina Ilhamy (far left) with her husband and children

Princess Emina married her father's cousin, Tewfik Pasha, the son of Egypt's Khedive, Isma'il the Magnificent, on Thursday 16 January 1873. In celebration of the event, Khedive Isma'il held a reception at al-Hilmiyya Palace attended by Tewfik, several ministers of state, and the leading religious dignitaries. Poetry was composed and recited for the occasion by al-Sayyid Ali Abu al-Nasr, and Muhammad Qadri Bey.

Emina and Tewfik had five children together; Prince Abbas Hilmi Pasha, born in 1874; Prince Mohammed Ali Tewfik Pasha, born in 1875; Princess Nazli Hanim, born in 1877; Princess Khadija Hanim, born in 1880; and Princess Nimetullah Hanim, born in 1882.

After Tewfik's accession to the Egyptian throne in 1879, Emina took a more prominent public role than previous women in the khedival family. Tewfik abandoned the ruling tradition of slave concubinage and polygyny by taking Emina as his sole consort. He became Egypt's first monogamous ruler. Emina was referred to in the Arabic press as "the Wife of Khedive" (Haram al-Khidiwi), and in French and English as the vice-reine, khédiveh, or "khediva." With the death of Tewfik's mother, and paternal grandmother in 1884 and 1886, she became the senior woman in the khedival household.

As Khediva, she regularly received the wives and daughters of European diplomats and visitors. Her presence at official events was mentioned regularly. When present at state events, Emina and her entourage would sit behind a screen. On holidays, she would receive the greetings of female guests personally, while those of the male guests were conveyed to her by her chief eunuch. The press usually discreetly avoided mentioning her name.

== As Walida Pasha ==
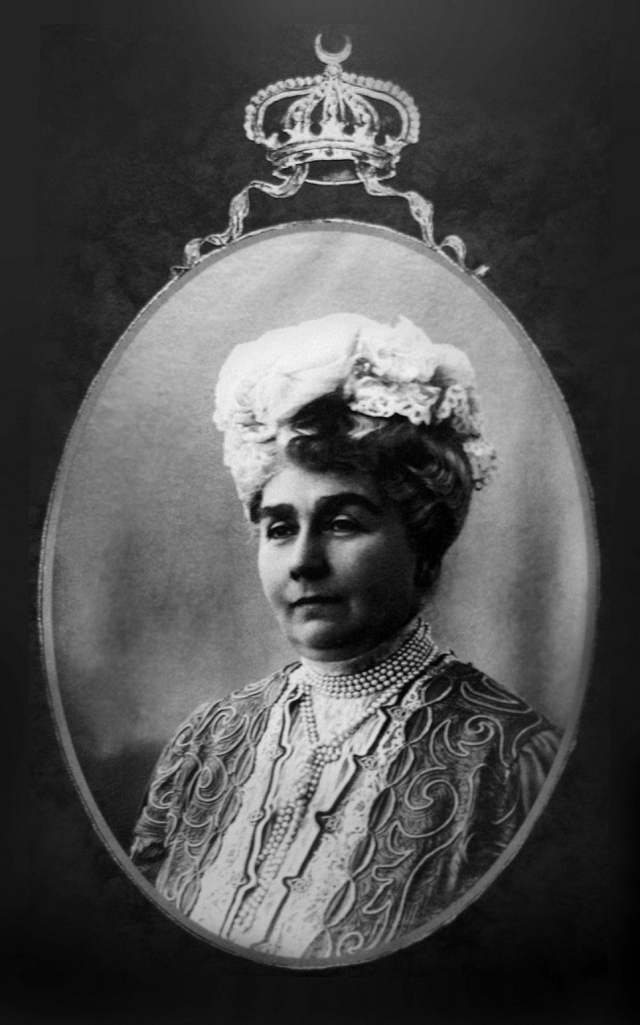
Emina Ilhamy in old age

At the death of her husband, Khedive Tewfik, her son, Abbas Hilmi Pasha, succeeded to the throne on 7 January 1892. As a result, Emina retained a prominent role as the Walida Pasha, or mother of the Khedive, though English writers often used the French term khédiveh mére. She maintained the seniority as the Walida Pasha, which she had when she was a Khediva, and continued to have a diplomatic role.

In possession of a large personal fortune, Emina gave a great part of it away in donations to charitable institutions, and was surnamed "Umm al-Muhsinin" (Mother of Charity). A girls' school that she founded, whose principal ornament is a heavy, ornate sabil in Turkish baroque style, stands close to the mosque of Ibn Tulun. It is now known by the name of Umm Abbas, "Mother of Abbas."

Emina and her son kept slaves in their households until the First World War. Even though her husband professed opposition to slavery, Emina presided over a harem of slave women, three of whom she gave to Abbas. Despite breaking with some aspects of traditional harem culture as it was in the harem of the Muhammad Ali dynasty, such as permitting her unveiled portrait to be published in 1923 and later, she continued to conduct herself in accordance with the culture of harem slavery for the rest of her life.

She established an extensive endowment, which was partially used to pay pensions to sixty former slaves, including ten eunuchs. Most of the recipients were women, a slight majority of whom were married or widows, indicating that they had left Emina's service at some earlier date. Others, like her chief servant Lady Qamar, apparently remained in her service until her death in 1931.

== Death ==
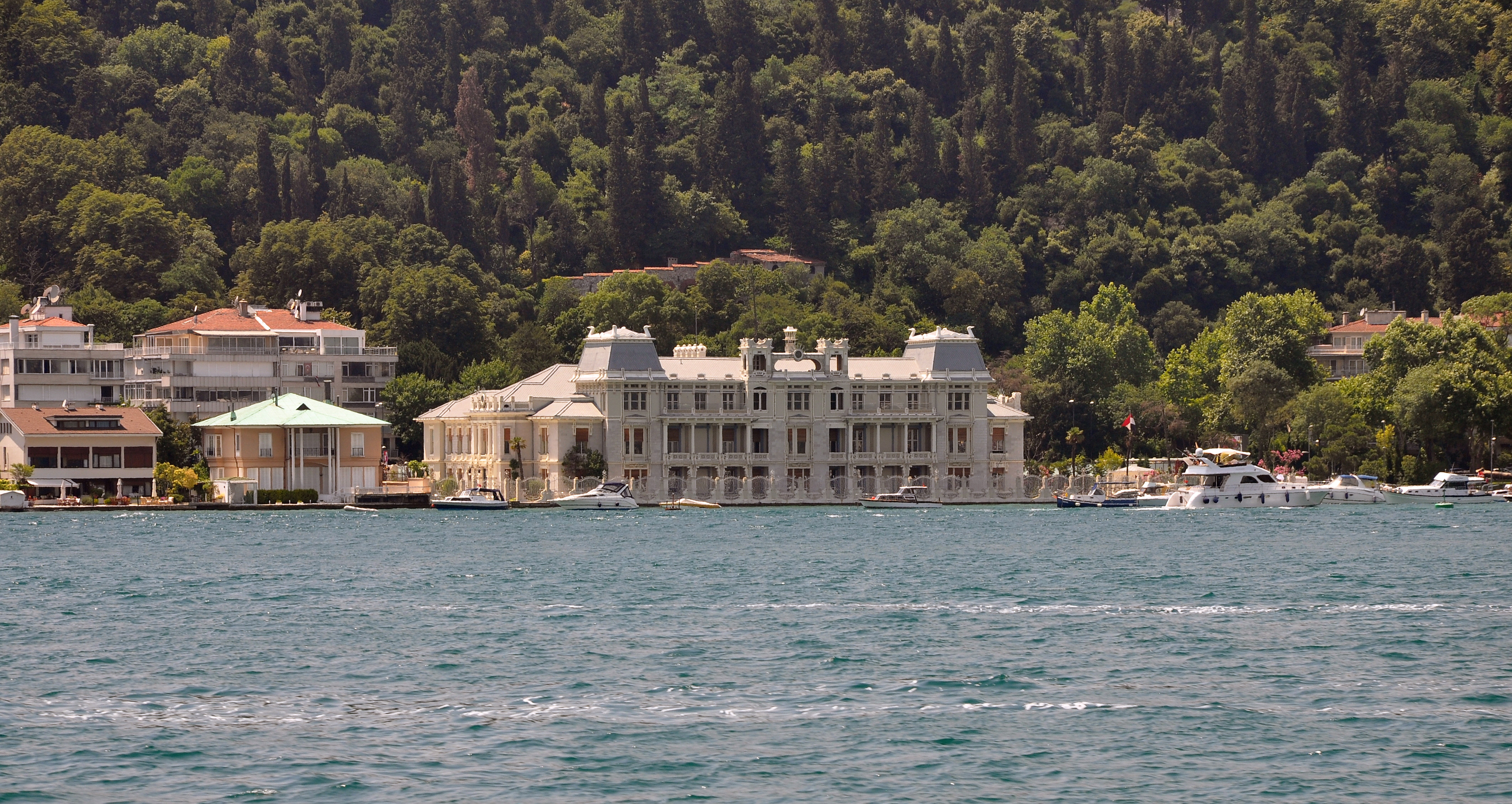
The Khediva Mansion in Bebek, Istanbul, on the European side of the Bosporus strait. Designed by Raimondo D'Aronco and Antonio Lasciac in the Art Nouveau style, it was built by Khediva Emina Ilhamy between 1899 and 1901 on the site of a previous yalı that was given to her as a gift by Sultan Abdul Hamid II in 1896 (the previous yalı was popularly known with the name of its owner before the Sultan, Grand Vizier Âli Pasha, who had purchased it from Grand Vizier Rauf Pasha). It is currently the Consulate of Egypt in Istanbul.

Emina died in exile in her country house on 19 June 1931 at Bebek, Bosphorus, Istanbul, and was buried in Khedive Tawfik Mausoleum, Kait Bey, Cairo.

== Issue ==
Together with Tewfik she had five children:

- Abbas Hilmi II Pasha, Khedive of Egypt;
- Prince Mohammed Ali Tewfik (Kubba Palace, Cairo, 9 November 1875 – Lausanne, Switzerland, 18 March 1955, and buried in Khedive Tawfik Mausoleum, Kait Bey, Cairo);
- Princess Nazli Hanim (11 April 1877 – Cairo, c. 1879);
- Princess Khadija Hanim (Cairo, 21 May 1880 – Helwan, 22 February 1951);
- Princess Nimetullah Hanim (Cairo, 23 October 1882 – Nice, France, c. 1965, and buried there at the cimetière de Caucade);

== Honour ==
Foreign honour

- Ottoman Empire: Decoration of the Order of Charity, 1st class, 16 July 1885

== Ancestry ==
Ancestors of Emina Ilhamy

16. Muhammad Ali of Egypt
8. Tusun Pasha
17. Amina Hanim
4. Abbas I of Egypt
9. Bamba Qadin
2. Ibrahim Ilhamy Pasha
5. Mahivech Hanim
1. Emina Ilhamy
3. Nasrin Qadin

== See also ==
- List of consorts of the Muhammad Ali Dynasty

== Sources ==
- Cuno, Kenneth M. (April 1, 2015). Modernizing Marriage: Family, Ideology, and Law in Nineteenth- and Early Twentieth-Century Egypt. Syracuse University Press. ISBN 978-0-815-65316-5.
- Doumani, Beshara (2003). Family History in the Middle East: Household, Property, and Gender. SUNY Press. ISBN 978-0-791-48707-5.

Egyptian royalty
New title Title created	Khediva consort of Egypt; 25 June 1879 – 7 January 1892	Succeeded by Ikbal Hanim
Preceded by Shafaq Nur Hanim	Walida Pasha of Egypt; 8 January 1892 – 19 December 1914	Vacant Title next held by Nur Felek Qadin as Walida Sultan
