= Ibrahim Ilhami Pasha =

Son of Abbas I of Egypt and his wife Mahivech Khanum Effendi (1836-1860)

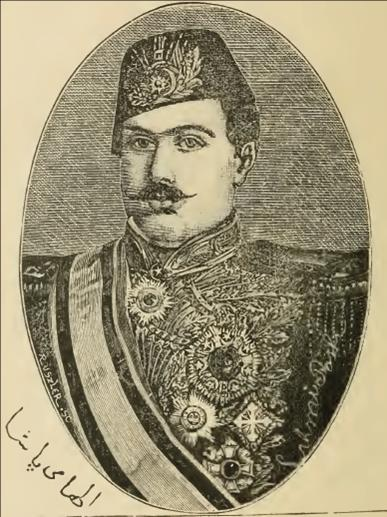
- Born: 3 January 1836; Cairo, Egypt
- Died: 9 September 1860 (aged 24); Bebek Palace, Istanbul, Ottoman Empire
- Burial: Hosh al-Basha Mausoleum of Imam al-Shafi'i, Cairo, Egypt
- Spouse: Münire Sultan (m. 1854): Nasrin Qadin; Jeshmi Ahu Qadin; Ashiq Bayran Qadin
- Issue: Emina Ilhamy; Zeynab Ilhamy; Tevhide Ilhamy
- Father: Abbas I of Egypt
- Mother: Mahivech Hanim

Ibrahim Ilhami Pasha (Arabic: إبراهيم إلهامي باشا; 3 January 1836 – 9 September 1860) was the only surviving son of Abbas I of Egypt and his wife Mahivech Hanim.

Ibrahim Ilhami was circumcised in 1849. In July 1854, following his father Abbas's death, his loyalists unsuccessfully attempted to raise him to the throne.

== Personal life ==
In March 1854, a messenger from Istanbul announced the betrothal of Ibrahim Pasha to Münire Sultan, daughter of Abdulmejid I and his wife Verdicenan Kadın. Large public celebrations were proclaimed, and the viceroy was reported to be highly pleased with the news. Ibrahim Pasha sent her a solitaire ring, solitaire earrings and a briolette as her betrothal gifts. There were also all sorts of perfumes covered with transparent lids and bowls of musk and mastic. There were crystal carafes containing syrup and porcelain vases from Saxony holding all sorts of preserves, and finally there were both eastern and western candies on plates of Chinese porcelain. Verdicenan Kadın gave some of these perfumes and morsels of food to other princesses, and also distributed them equally to the people in her entourage. The engagement took place in the Şemsipaşa Palace.

The marriage took place on 10 August 1854 in at the Baltalimanı sahilhane, Istanbul. The marriage was consummated on 31 July 1857. The couple were given a palace located at Findiklı as their residence.

Ibrahim had three consorts, Nasrin Qadin (died 1871), mother of Princess Emina Ilhamy, born in 1858, Jeshmi Ahu Qadin (died 1905), mother of Princess Zeynab Ilhamy, born in 1859, and Ashiq Bayran Qadin (died 1878), mother of Tevhide Ilhamy, born in 1860. The eldest, Emine, married Tewfik Pasha, the eldest son of Isma'il Pasha, and Zeynab married Mahmud Hamdi Pasha, the fifth son of Isma'il Pasha.

== Death ==
Prince Ibrahim died on 9 September 1860 when his boat capsized while crossing the Bosphorus, near Bebek Palace, at what is now Bebek Bay.

== Issue ==
Prince Ibrahim Ilhami had three daughters:

- Princess Emina Ilhamy (24 May 1858, Istanbul – 19 June 1931, Bebek, Bosphorus, Istanbul, Turkey);
- Princess Zeynab Ilhamy (29 December 1859, Istanbul — 17 May 1918, Cairo, Egypt);
- Princess Tevhide Ilhamy (1860, Istanbul — 1882, Cairo);

== Ancestry ==
Ancestors of Ibrahim Ilhami Pasha

16. Ibrahim Agha
8. Muhammad Ali of Egypt
17. Zeynab Hanim
4. Tusun Pasha
18. Nusratli Ali Agha
9. Amina Hanim
2. Abbas I of Egypt
5. Bamba Qadin
1. Ibrahim Ilhami Pasha
3. Mahivech Hanim
