= Fatimid harem =

The Fatimid harem belonged to the rulers of the Fatimid dynasty during the Fatimid Caliphate of Egypt (909–1171).

The harem was the quarters of the royal court in which the female members of the court, including the female relatives, wives, concubines (sex slaves) and female servants lived in seclusion under sex segregation. This was common for all Muslim royal courts, with some variation in how the harem was organized.

== Hierarchy and organization ==
The Fatimid harem (909–1171) built upon the established model of the Abbasid harem.

=== Female relatives ===
The highest ranked woman in the Fatimid harem was normally the mother of the Caliph, or alternatively the mother of the heir or a female relative, who was given the title sayyida or al-sayyida al-malika ("queen").

There was a general dislike of Fatimid princesses marrying outside of the family, since their marriage was seen as a potential political security risk, and it appears they either remained unmarried or married their cousins.

=== Consorts ===
The consorts of the Caliph were originally slave-girls whom the Caliph either married or used as concubines; in either case, a consort of the Caliph was referred to as jiha or al-jiha al-aliya ("Her Highness").

The concubines of the Fatimid Caliphs were in most cases of Christian origin, described as beautiful singers, dancers and musicians.

Aside from girls received as gifts or bought at the slave market, some girls came to the harem as war captives. For example, when Abd Allah al-Mahdi Billah defeated the aghlabids, the women and the eunuchs who had belonged to the Afghlabid harem were transferred to the possession of the Fatimid harem.

Often the target of love poems, consorts were often accused of manipulating the Caliph.

=== Female entertainers ===
The third rank harem women were slave-girls trained in singing, dancing and playing music to perform as entertainers. Women in this category were sometimes given as diplomatic gifts between male power holders.

=== Female servants ===
The lowest rank of harem women were the slave-girls selected to become servants, and who performed a number of different tasks in the harem and royal household; wives, female relatives and favorite concubines could be given hundreds of female slaves as servants.

In 1122, there were six lady treasurers (khuzzan), and during the reign of al-Hafiz a woman, Sitt Ghazal, were appointed supervisor of the caliphal inkwell (dawa), an office otherwise always held by men.

The Fatimid appointed slave wet nurses to raise their children in order to prevent the mothers to have influence over their children, and these wet nurses could achieve a position of great influence as the foster mother of the heir to the throne and the link between the heir to the throne, his mother and the monarch.

The lowest ranked female slave servants were the women called shadadat who had some contact with the outside world, as they trafficked goods from the outside world to the harem via the underground tunnels known as saradib, which connected the different parts of the royal palace with each other.

All (slave) women employed at court were called mustakhdimat or qusuriyyat; women employed in the royal household were called muqimat and those employed in the royal workshops were in Fustat or Qarafa were called munqaqitat. Slave women worked in royal workshops, arbab al-san'i min al-qusuriyyat, which manufactured clothing and food. Those employed at the public workshops were called zahir, and those working in the workshops who manufactured items exclusively for the royal household were called khassa.

There were often about thirty slave women in each workshop who worked under the supervision of a female slave called zayn al-khuzzan, a position normally given to a Greek slave woman.

=== Eunuchs ===
The enslaved eunuchs managed the women of the harem, guarded them, informed them and reported on them to the Caliph, and acted as their link to the outside world.

The highest office in the household was the court chamberlain (hajib), who was directly below the vizier in rank and often a eunuch.

The harem of both the Caliph himself as well as other male members of the upper classes could include thousands of slaves: the vizier Ibn, for example, had a household of 800 concubines and 4,000 male bodyguards. Ibn Muyassar described a hall of relaxation used by vizier al-Afdal with a line of mechanical mannequins (siwar) facing each other at the entrance: four depicting white slave girls made of camphor, and four depicting black slave girls made of amber, who bowed down when the vizier entered the room, and raised their heads when he sat down.

== See also ==
- Muhammad Ali dynasty harem
- Slavery in the Fatimid Caliphate
- Harem#Mamluk Sultanate
- Fatimid Great Palaces

== Bibliography ==
=== Sources ===
- Cortese, Delia; Calderini, Simonetta (2006). Women And the Fatimids in the World of Islam. Edinburgh University Press. ISBN 0748617329.
