= Shafaq Nur Hanim =

- Fourth Princess; Walida Pasha
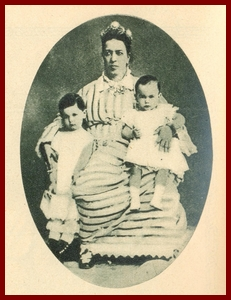

Princess consort of Egypt
- Tenure: 1866 – 26 June 1879

Khediva Mother of Egypt
- Tenure: 26 June 1879 – 17 March 1884
- Predecessor: Hoshiyar Hanim
- Successor: Emina of Ilhamy
- Born: 1833
- Died: 17 March 1884 (aged 50–51); Qasr el-'Âli Palace, Cairo, Khedivate of Egypt
- Burial: Al-Rifa'i Mosque
- Spouse: Isma'il Pasha of Egypt (m. 1866)
- Issue: Tewfik, Khedive of Egypt
Names
- English: Shafaq Nur Hanim; Arabic: شفق نور ھانم; Turkish: Şafak Nur Hanım
- House: Alawiyya (by marriage)
- Religion: Sunni Islam

Shafaq Nur Hanim (Note: (Arabic: شفق نور هانم; Turkish: Şafak Nur Hanım) (died 17 March 1884) was the fourth wife of Khedive Isma'il Pasha and was Walida Pasha to their son Tewfik Pasha, the next Khedive of Egypt and Sudan.

== Early years ==
Shafaq Nur Hanim had been a servant in the household of Isma'il's mother Hoshiyar Qadin in the harem of the Muhammad Ali dynasty via the Circassian slave trade. When Isma'il was about twenty years old, his mother presented him with Shafaq Nur (as a concubine). He began his sexual activity under the watchful eye of his mother. Shafaq Nur gave birth to his second child, and his first surviving son, Tewfik Pasha, on 30 April 1852 at the Qasr al-Maniyal Palace. Although Isma'il had married the first three princesses ahead of Shafaq Nur, she undoubtedly had high standing in his harem as the mother of his oldest son and as a former member of his mother's household.

She was often referred to in the sources as "Walida" or "Mother". In 1866, fourteen years after Tewfik's birth, Ismail married Shafaq Nur as the Egyptian law required to marry the mother of the heir apparent, and elevated her to the position of the "Fourth Princess". Not long after, she and her son established a separate residence in al-Qubba Palace. She took her due place with the other wives of Ismail Pasha on all state occasions. In Egypt she was known as Deurtundju Hanim or Fourth Lady. She mostly wore traditional Ottoman garments, featuring a few western details.

== As Walida Pasha ==
Isma'il was deposed by the Sultan Abdul Hamid II acting on the advice of the European powers, on 26 June 1879, and his son became the Khedive and Shafaq Nur became the Walida Pasha. Shafak Nur exerted considerable influence on him emerging as his staunch defender as the royal family split on the 'Urabi revolution. Alexander Meyrick Broadley, the British lawyer who defender general 'Urabi, described the way she subjected the princesses of the royal family who supported the leader of the revolution to a tongue lashing for their disloyalty and promising to severely punish them.

== Death ==
Shafaq Nur Hanim died at the Kasr al-'Ali Palace on 17 March 1884, and was buried in the Khedival Mausoleum, Al-Rifa'i Mosque, Cairo.

== In popular culture ==
In the 2014 Egyptian historical drama series Saraya Abdeen, Shafaq Nur is portrayed by Egyptian actress May Kassab.

== See also ==
- List of consorts of the Muhammad Ali Dynasty

Egyptian royalty
Preceded by Hoshiyar Qadin	Walida Pasha of Egypt; 26 June 1879 - 17 March 1884	Succeeded by Emina Ilhamy
