= Bebek, Beşiktaş =

Neighbourhood in Istanbul, Turkey

Bebek
- Neighbourhood
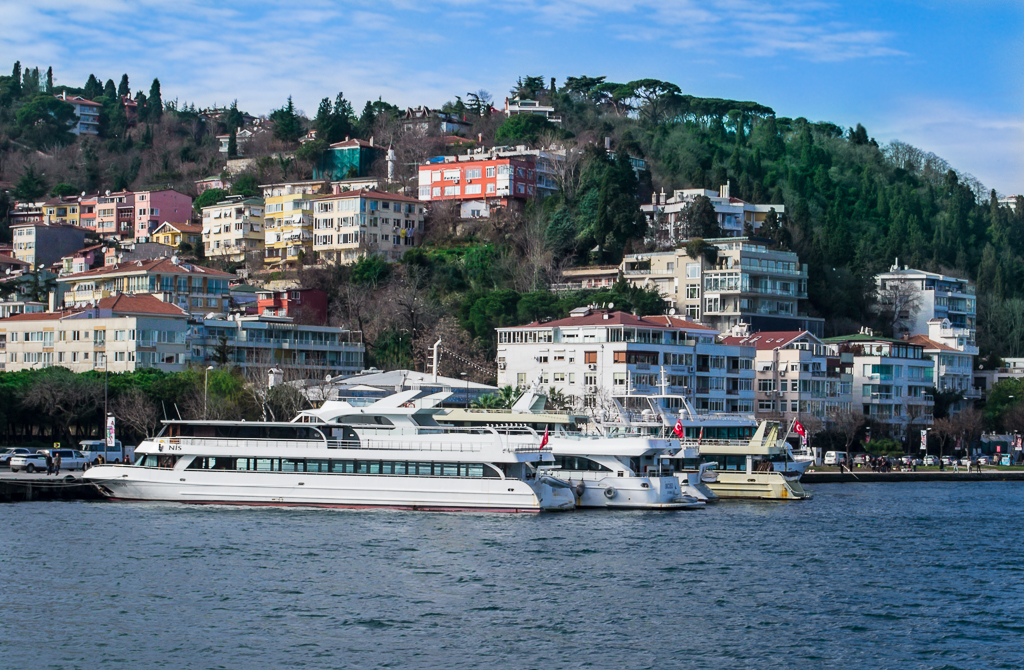

- Location within Turkey Location within Istanbul
- Coordinates: 41°04′32″N 29°02′39″E
- Country: Turkey
- Province: Istanbul
- District: Beşiktaş
- Population (2022): 5,464
- Time zone: UTC+3 (TRT)

Bebek (lit. baby) is a neighbourhood in the municipality and district of Beşiktaş, Istanbul, Turkey. Its population is 5,464 (2022). It is on Bebek Bay on the European shore of the Bosphorus strait.

Some believe its use as a name comes from a shortened form of the term 'Boğaz'ın gözbebeği', which means 'pupil of the Bosphorus' or "the apple of the Bosphorus' eye" in Turkish. Others think it takes its name from the nickname for Mustafa Çelebi who was put in charge of this area after the Ottoman conquest of Constantinople in 1453. Others think it took its name from the Turkish expression meaning 'pretty as a baby'.

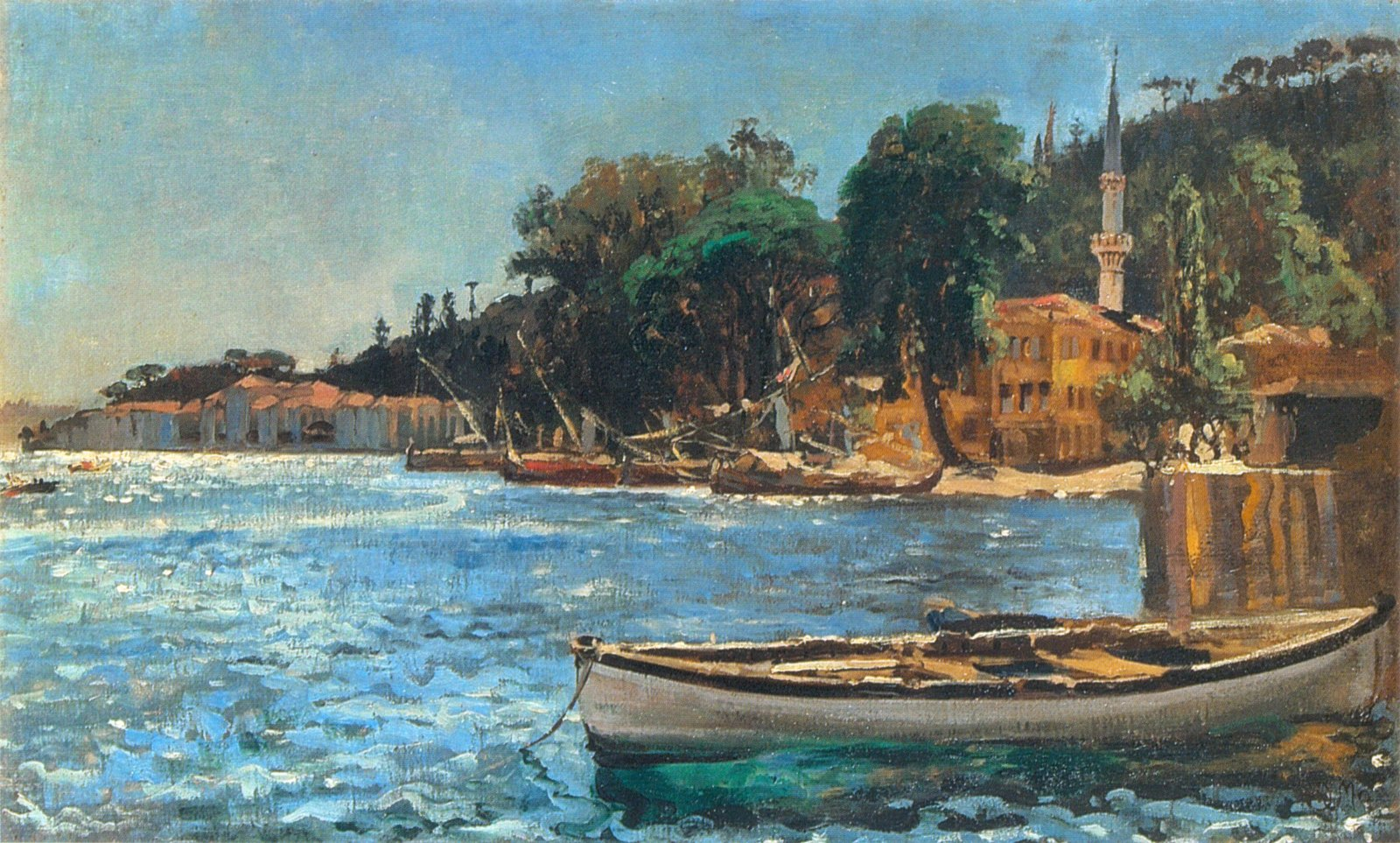
Jan Matejko, View of Bebek, 1872

== Notable sites ==
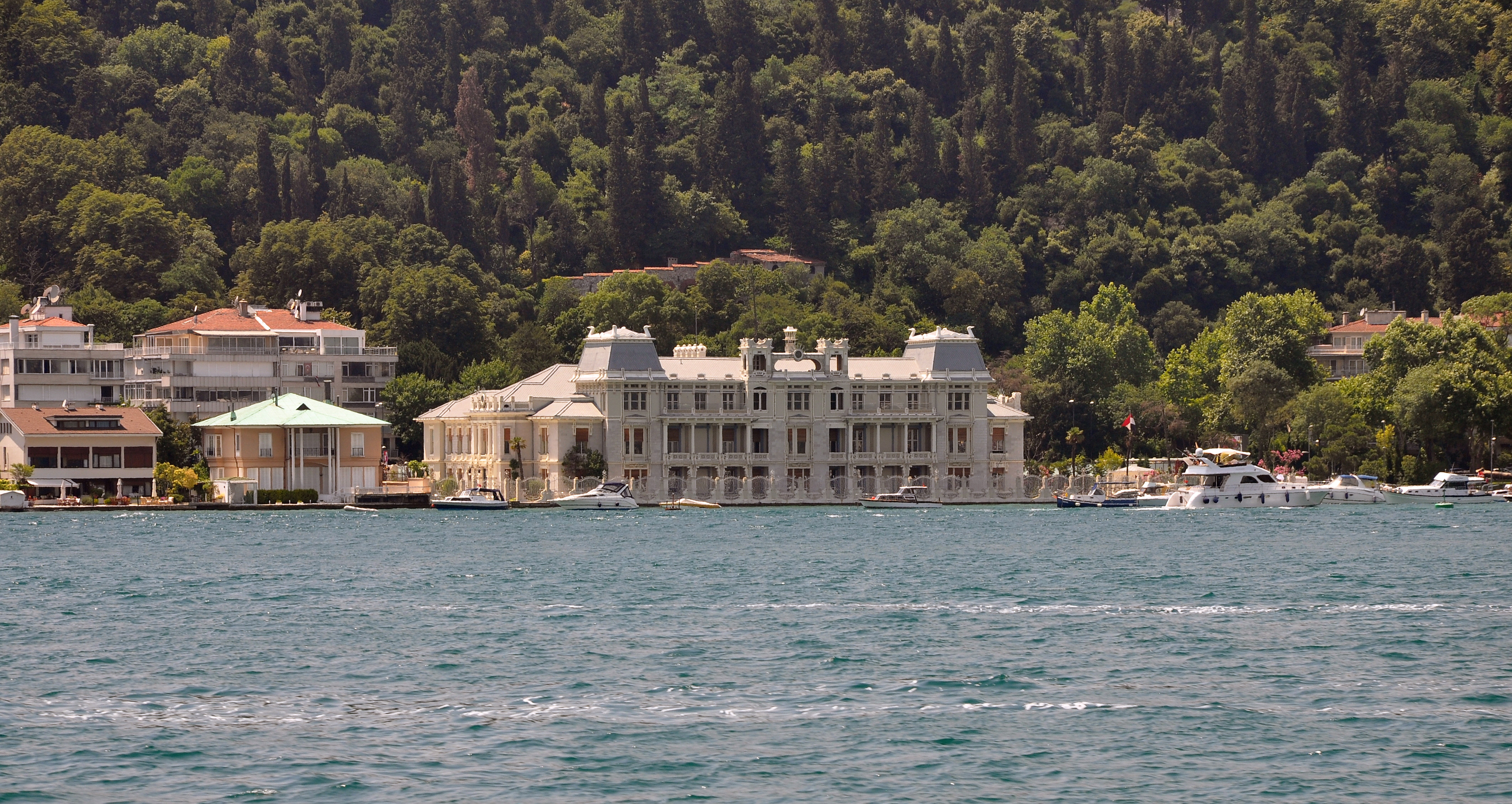
The Khediva Mansion in Bebek became the Consulate of Egypt in Istanbul.

The huge waterfront mansion that houses the Egyptian Consulate was originally built between 1899 and 1901 for Emina Ilhamy (Emine Hanım), mother of Abbas Hilmi, the last Khedive of Egypt, in the days when the Egyptian nobility spent summers on the Bosphorus.

The small Bebek Mosque was designed in 1912 by the architect Kemaleddin Bey.

The Kavafyan Mansion (tr is one of the oldest wooden buildings in Istanbul. Dating back to 1751, it was built for Armenian shipbuilders. and has fallen into decay.

Bebek is the site of Boğaziçi University.

== Image gallery ==
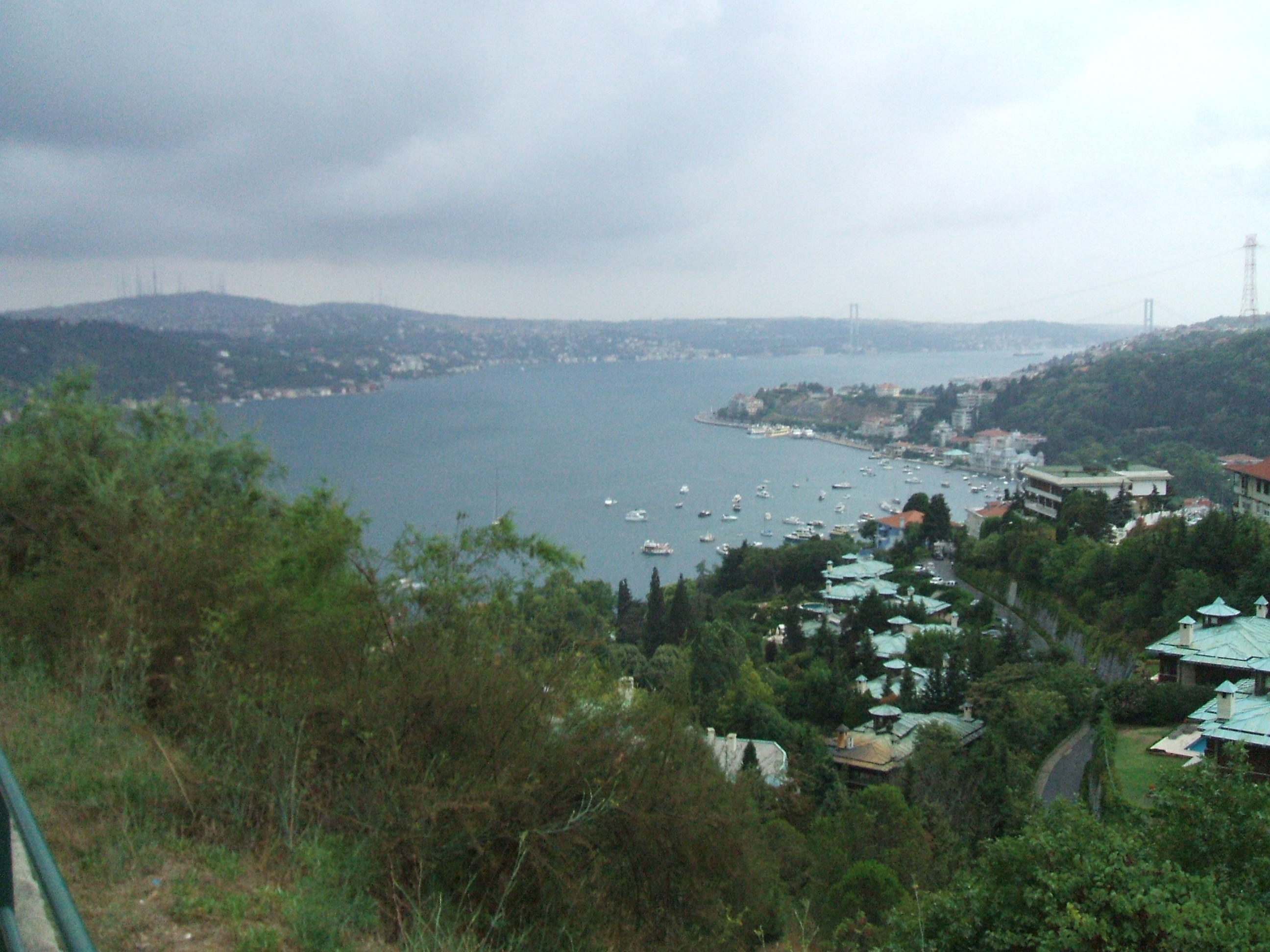
A view of Bebek and the Bosporus strait

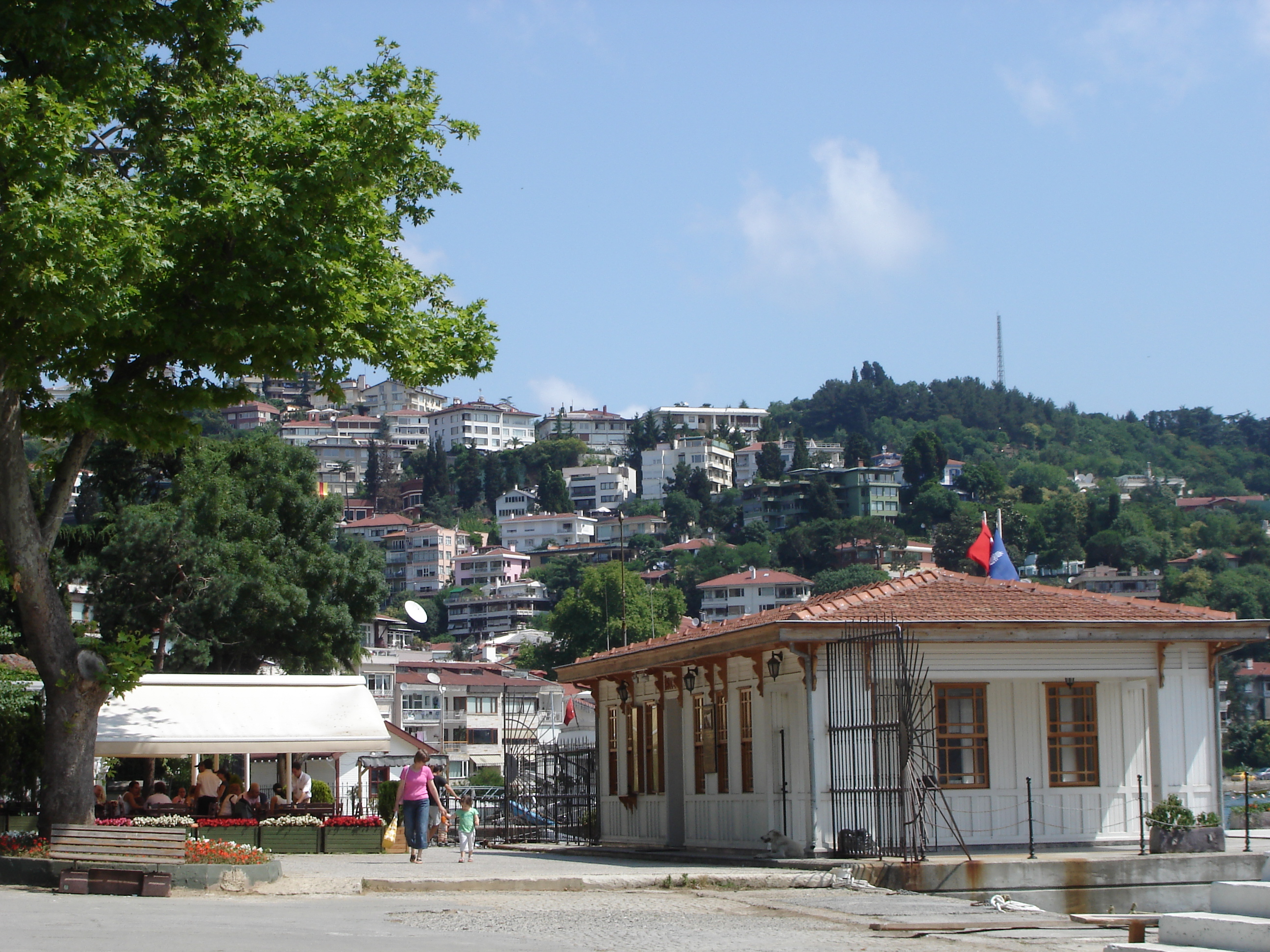
A view of Bebek Park

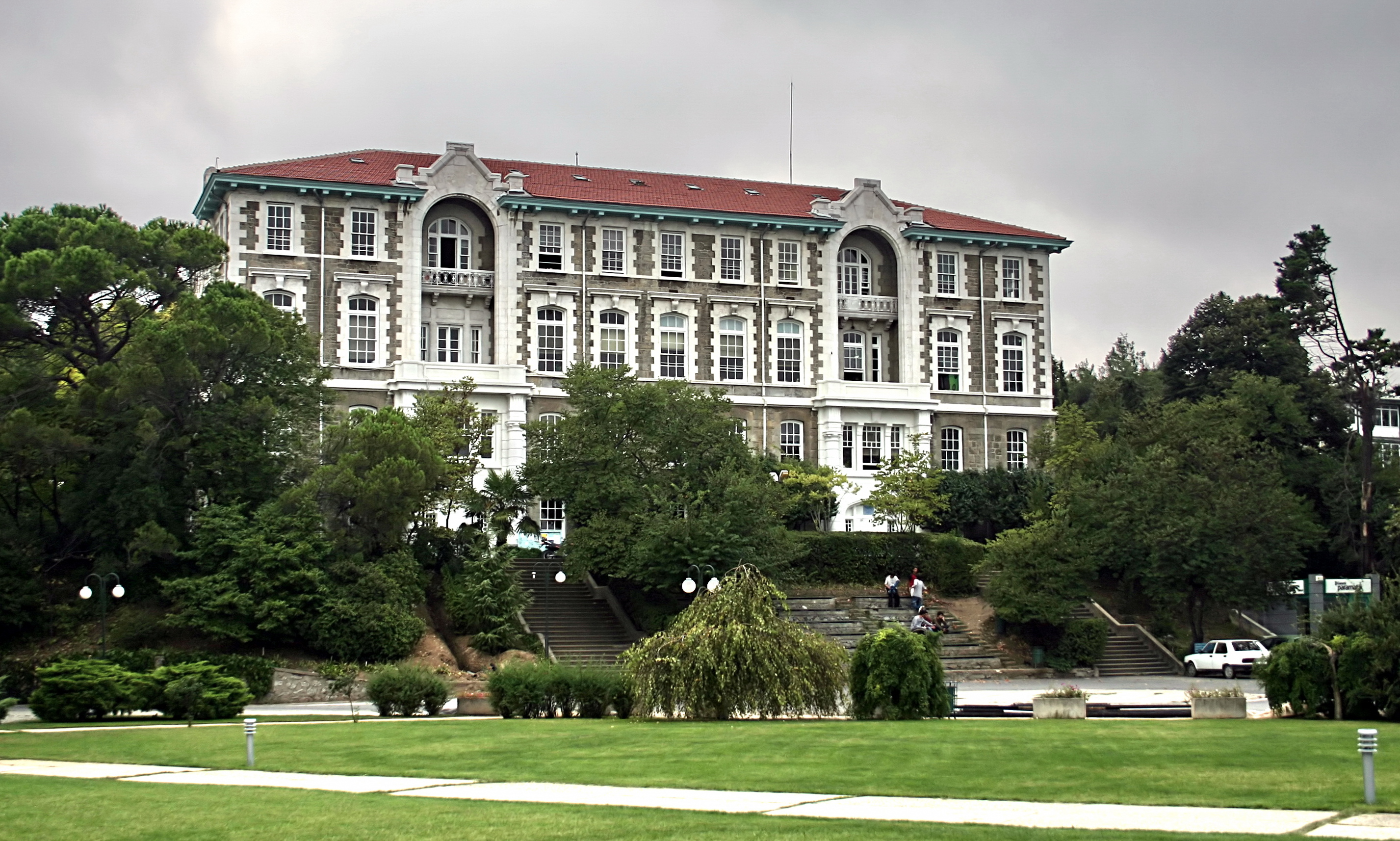
The campus of Boğaziçi University in Bebek, formerly the college section of Robert College

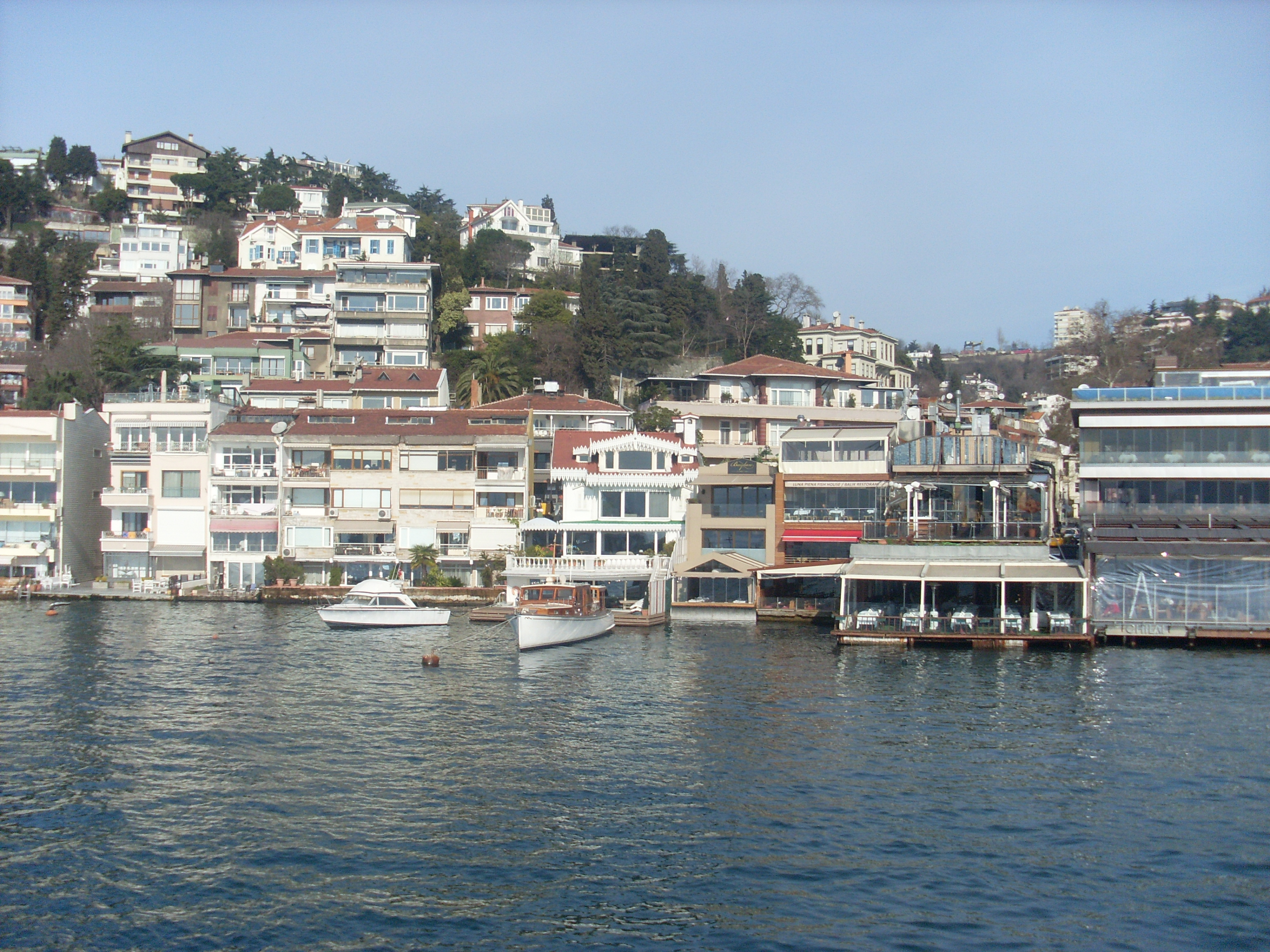
Seaside cafés and restaurants in Bebek

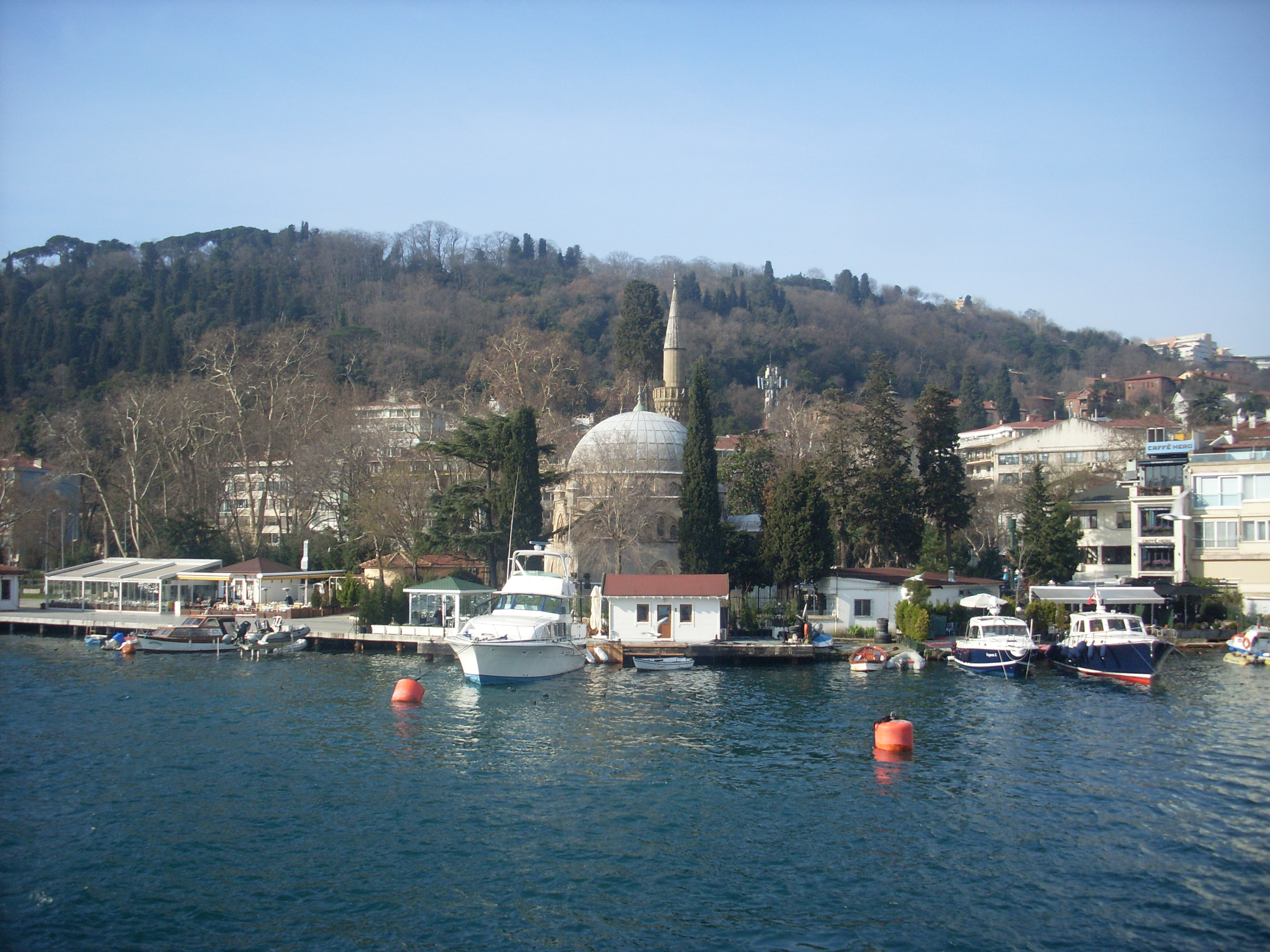
Bebek Mosque

== See also ==
- Emirgan Park
- Rumelihisarı
