= Mahivech Hanim =

First consort of Abbas I of Egypt (died 1889)

- Died: 13 November 1889; Cairo, Egypt
- Burial: Mahmud Hamdi Pasha Mausoleum, Cairo
- Spouse: Abbas I of Egypt (died 1854)
- Issue: Ibrahim Ilhami Pasha
Names
- Arabic: مھوش هانم; Turkish: Mehveş Hanım
- House: Muhammad Ali (by marriage)
- Religion: Sunni Islam

Mahivech Hanim (Arabic: مھوش هانم; Turkish: Mehveş Hanım; died 13 November 1889) was the first consort of Abbas I of Egypt (1812-1854), and mother of Ibrahim Ilhami Pasha (1836-1860).

Mahivech married Abbas Hilmi, and gave birth to the couple's only child, a son, Prince Ibrahim Hilmi Pasha on 3 January 1836. She was widowed at Abbas Hilmi's death in July 1854. Her son died in September 1860, when his boat capsized while crossing the Bosphorus, near Bebek Palace, at what is now Bebek Bay.

Since the early 1860s, Mehvish Hanim, lived in Aksaray, Fatih, Istanbul. In 1870, she sponsored the rebuilding of Aksaray Oğlanlar Tekke, which had been left ruined since 1840. In 1871–72, she sponsored a fountain in the courtyard of Murad Pasha Mosque in Aksaray.

Mahivech Hanim died on 13 November 1889, and was buried in the mausoleum of Mahmud Hamdi Pasha, Cairo, Egypt.

== See also ==
- List of consorts of the Muhammad Ali Dynasty
- Muhammad Ali Dynasty family tree
