= Harem of the Muhammad Ali dynasty =

Harem of the ruler of Egypt

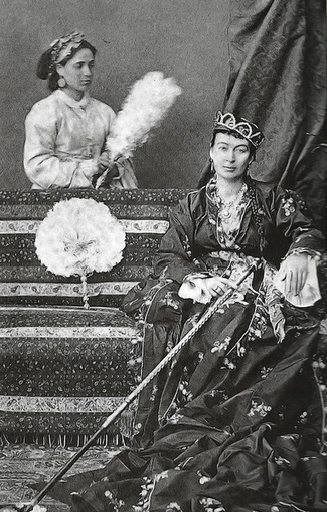
Inji Hanim

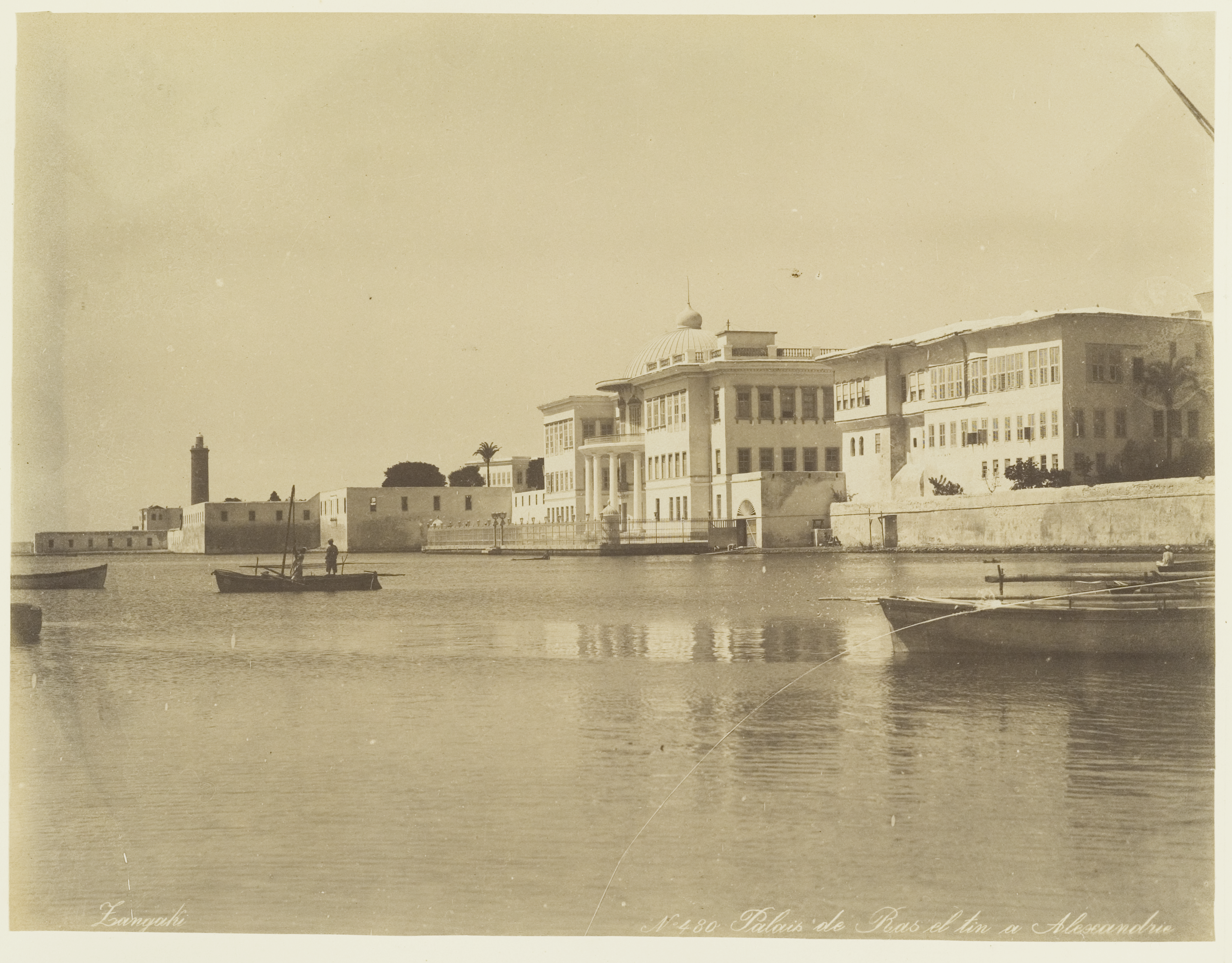
Ras El Tin Palace c. 1890

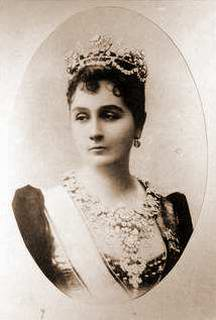
Emina Ilhamy

The rulers of the Muhammad Ali dynasty kept a harem during the Khedivate of Egypt (1805–1914).

The harem was the quarters of the royal court in which the female members of the court, including the female relatives, wives, concubines (sex slaves) and female servants lived in seclusion under sex segregation. This was common for all Muslim royal courts, with some variation in how the harem was organized. In the case of the Muhammad Ali dynasty, the harem was dissolved in the 1930s, when the women of the royal family left seclusion.

== History ==
The royal harem during the Muhammad Ali dynasty of the Khedivate of Egypt (1805–1914) was modelled after Ottoman example, the khedives being the Egyptian viceroys of the Ottoman sultans.

Muhammad Ali was appointed vice roy of Egypt in 1805, and by Imperial Ottoman example assembled a harem of slave concubines in the Palace Citadel of Cairo which, according to a traditional account, made his legal wife Amina Hanim declare herself to henceforth be his wife in name only, when she joined him in Egypt in 1808 and discovered his sex slaves.

=== Hierarchy and organization ===
Similar to the Ottoman Imperial harem, the harem of the khedive was modelled on a system of polygyny based on slave concubinage, in which each wife or concubine was limited to having one son. The women harem slaves mostly came from Caucasus via the Circassian slave trade and were referred to as "white".

The khedive's harem was composed of between several hundreds to over a thousand enslaved women, supervised by his mother, the walida pasha, and his four official wives (hanim) and recognized concubines (qadin). However, the majority of the slave women served as domestics to his mother and wives, and could have servant offices such as the bash qalfa, chief servant slave woman of the walida pasha.

The enslaved female servants of the khedivate harem were manumitted and married off with a trousseau in strategic marriages to the male freedmen or slaves (kul or mamluk) who were trained to become officers and civil servants as freedmen, in order to ensure the fidelity of their husband's to the khedive when they began their military or state official career.

A minority of the slave women were selected to become the personal servants (concubines) of the khedive, often selected by his mother: they could become his wives, and would become free as an umm walad (or mustawlada) if they had children with their enslaver.

Muhammad Ali of Egypt reportedly had at least 25 consorts (wives and concubines), and Khedive Ismail fourteen consorts of slave origin, four of whom where his wives.

The Egyptian elite of bureaucrat families, who emulated the khedive, had similar harem customs, and it was noted that it was common for Egyptian upper-class families to have slave women in their harem, which they manumitted to marry off to male protegees.

=== End of the harem ===
This system gradually started to change after 1873, when Tewfik Pasha married Emina Ilhamy as his sole consort, making monogamy the fashionable ideal among the elite, after the throne succession had been changed to primogeniture, which favored monogamy. The wedding of Tewfik Pasha and Emina Ilhamy was the first wedding of a prince that were celebrated, since the princes had previously merely taken slave concubines, who they sometimes married afterward.

The end of the Circassian slave trade and the elimination of slave concubinage after the Anglo-Egyptian Slave Trade Convention also contributed to the end of the practice of polygyny in the Egyptian and Ottoman upper classes from the 1870s onward. In the mid-19th century, the Ottoman Tanzimat reforms abolished the custom of training male slaves to become military men and civil servants, and replaced them with free students.

All of this gradually diminished the royal harem, though it, as well as the harem of the elite families, still maintained a smaller number of male eunuchs and slave women until at least World War I. Khedive Abbas II of Egypt bought six "white female slaves" for his harem in 1894, and his mother still maintained sixty slaves as late as 1931. The royal harem was finally dissolved when the royal women escaped seclusion and took on a public role in the 1930s.

== See also ==
- List of consorts of the Muhammad Ali dynasty
- Fatimid harem
- Harem of the Mamluk Sultanate

== Bibliography ==
=== Sources ===
- Cuno, Kenneth (2015). Modernizing Marriage: Family, Ideology, and Law in Nineteenth- and Early Twentieth-Century Egypt. Syracuse University Press. ISBN 9780815633921.
