= Tewfik Pasha =

Khedive of Egypt and Sudan from 1879 to 1892

Muhammad Tewfik I محمد توفيق باشا
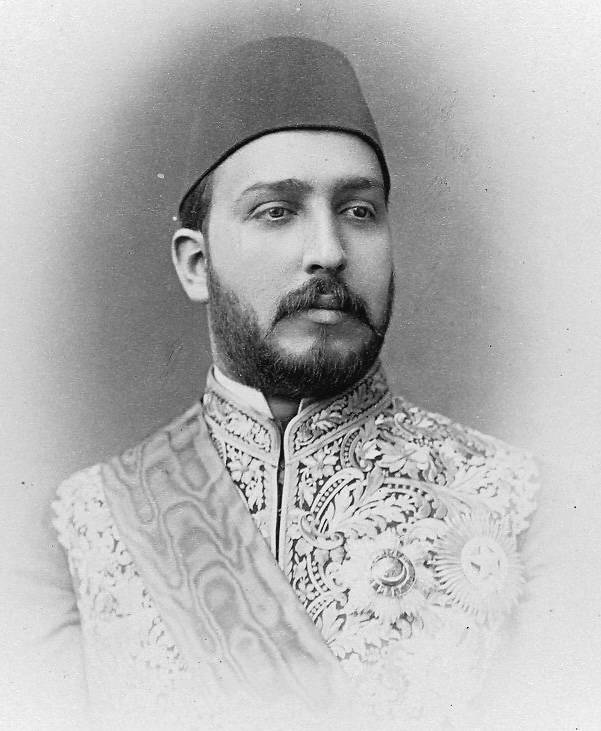
- Tewfik I, c. 1882

Khedive of Egypt and Sudan
- Reign: 26 June 1879 – 7 January 1892
- Predecessor: Isma'il
- Successor: Abbas Hilmi II
- Born: 15 November 1852; Cairo, Egypt Eyalet, Ottoman Empire
- Died: 7 January 1892 (aged 39); Helwan, Khedivate of Egypt, Ottoman Empire
- Burial: Qubbat Afandina, Cairo, Egypt
- Spouse: Emina Ilhamy (m. 1873)
- Issue: Abbas Hilmi II of Egypt; Prince Muhammad Ali Tewfik Pasha; Princess Nazli Hanim; Princess Fakhr un-nisa Khadija Hanim; Princess Nimatullah Hanim
- House: Alawiyya
- Father: Isma'il
- Mother: Shafaq Nur Hanim

Mohamed Tewfik Pasha (Arabic: محمد توفيق باشا Muḥammad Tawfīq Bāshā; April 30 or 15 November 1852 – 7 January 1892), also known as Tawfiq of Egypt, was Khedive of Egypt and the Sudan between 1879 and 1892 and the sixth ruler from the Muhammad Ali dynasty. He inherited a state suffering under the financial and political mismanagement of his predecessor Isma'il. Disaffection in the Egyptian army as well as Anglo-French control of the state in the 1880s culminated in the anti-foreign Urabi revolt. In 1882, Egypt became a British protectorate.

Tewfik also took interest in matters concerning irrigation, education and justice; as well as sold his father's female slaves and closed the court's harem quarters.

== Early life ==
He was the oldest son of Khedive Isma'il, and was born on April 30 or November 15, 1852. His mother was Princess Shafaq Nur Hanim. He was not sent to Europe to be educated like his younger brothers, but grew up in Egypt, although he spoke French and English fluently.

In 1866 Isma'il succeeded in his endeavour to alter the order of succession to the Khedivate of Egypt. The title, instead of passing to the oldest living male descendant of Muhammad Ali, was now to descend from father to son. Ismail sought this alteration mainly because he disliked his uncle, Halim Pasha, who was his heir-presumptive, and he had imagined that he would be able to select whichever of his sons he pleased as his successor. But he found, after the change had been made, that the Great Powers (Britain, Germany, Austria-Hungary, and the Ottoman Empire) interpreted the new arrangement as applying strictly to the eldest son. Tewfik therefore became heir-apparent. He was given a palace near Cairo to live in, and for twelve years he led an uneventful life, farming and establishing a reputation for good sense and fair dealing with his fellow tenants.

== Early career ==
In 1878 he was appointed president of the council after the dismissal of Nubar Pasha. He held this office only for a few months; but this was long enough to show that he had the wisdom to refrain from taking part in the intrigues which then dominated the political life in Egypt and Sudan.

He went back to his estate, and settled down once more to a quiet country life. He was undisturbed only for a short time. On 26 June 1879, Isma'il, at the insistence of Britain and France, was deposed by Sultan Abdul Hamid II, who sent orders at the same time that Tewfik should be proclaimed Khedive.

== Reign ==
The new khedive was so displeased by the news of his accession that he soundly boxed the ears of the servant who first brought the tidings to him. Egypt and Sudan at that time was involved in financial and political troubles brought about by the policy of Isma'il, and the situation was made worse by the inaction of Britain and France for some months following Tewfik's accession. Tewfik's people were dissatisfied, his army disaffected; his advisers were nearly all of the adventurer class, with their own ends to gain; and he himself had neither the character of a strong ruler nor the experience that would have enabled him to secure an orderly administration of affairs.

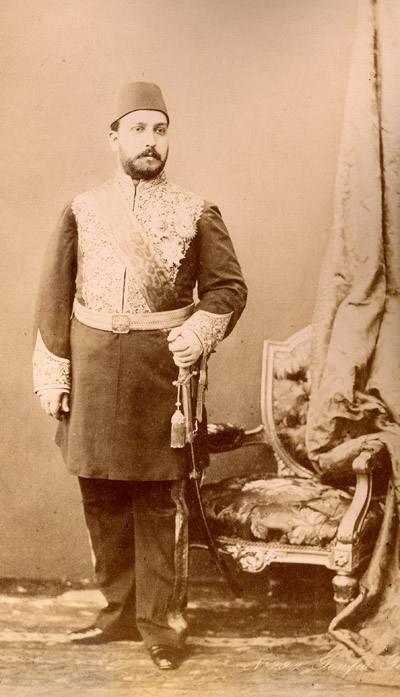
Tewfik Pasha

Disorder prevailed until November 1879, when the dual control was reestablished by the governments of Britain and France. For over two years Major Evelyn Baring (afterwards Lord Cromer), Auckland Colvin, and Monsieur Ernest de Blignières practically governed the country, endeavouring to institute reforms while possessing no means of coercion.

During all this time the disaffection in the Egyptian army was increasing. Tewfik had been blamed for his failure to take a firm line with the rebels, but his attitude was governed by his relations with Britain and France, and he was unable to control events. The dissatisfaction culminated in the anti-foreign movement headed by Urabi Pasha, who had gained complete command of the army. In July 1882 the attitude of Urabi, who was carrying out defensive works on a large scale, made the British admiral (Sir Beauchamp Seymour, afterwards Lord Alcester) to declare that he would bombard the forts of Alexandria unless they were handed over to him.

Before the bombardment began it was suggested to Tewfik that he should leave the city and embark either upon a man-of-war belonging to one of the neutral powers, or in his own yacht, or in a mail steamer which was then in the port. His answer was, "I am still Khedive, and I remain with my people in the hour of their danger." At his palace of Qasr el-Raml, three miles (five kilometers) from the town, he was beyond reach of the shells, but his life was nevertheless imperiled. When the rebel soldiers attacked the palace he managed to make his escape and to reach another palace after passing through the burning streets of Alexandria. Here he was obliged to agree that a guard of British bluejackets should protect him from further risk. He showed his courage equally during the cholera epidemic at Alexandria in 1883.

He had gone back to Cairo after the Battle of Tel al-Kebir, had consented to the reforms insisted upon by Britain, and had assumed the position of a constitutional ruler under the guidance of Lord Dufferin, the British special commissioner. When cholera broke out, he insisted upon going to Alexandria. His wife accompanied him, and he went round the hospitals, setting an excellent example to the authorities of the city, and encouraging the patients by kind and hopeful words.

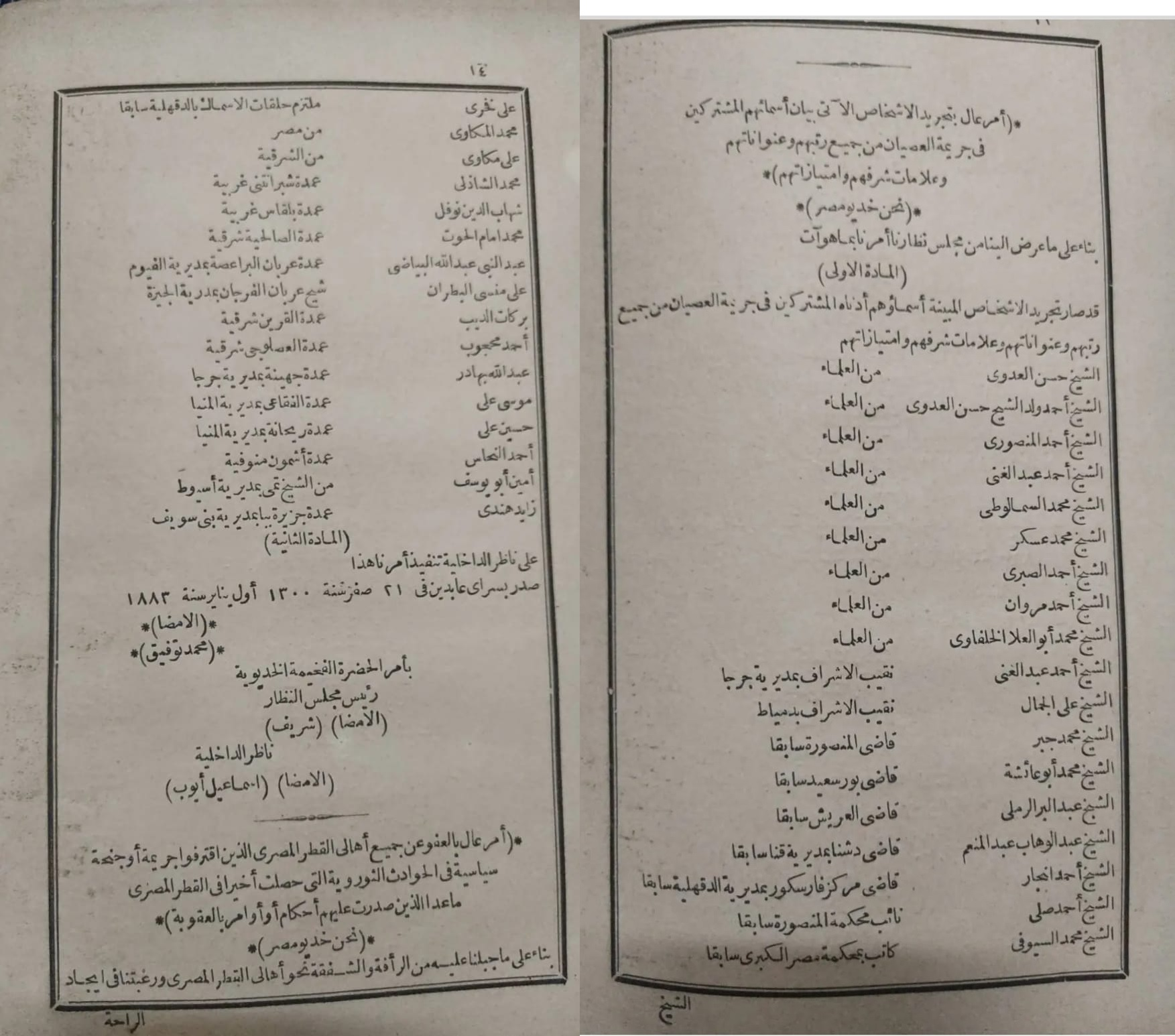
Khedive Tawfik Order at 1st January 1883 of punishing the civil leaders of the revilution including religious Shaikhs, Beduin tribes Sheikhs, city mayors, Judges, and other civil people.

Egyptian Fundamental Ordinance of 1882, a constitution, followed an abortive attempt to promulgate a constitution in 1879. The document was limited in scope and was effectively more of an organic law of the Consultative Council to the khedive than an actual constitution.

In 1884, Sir Evelyn Baring (Lord Cromer) went back to Egypt as diplomatic agent and Consul-General of Britain. His first task was to demand that Tewfik should abandon the Turco-Egyptian Sudan. Tewfik gave his consent with natural reluctance, but, having consented, he did everything he could to ensure the success of the policy which Baring had been sent to carry out. He behaved with equal propriety during the negotiations between Sir H. Drummond Wolff and the Turkish envoy, Mukhtar Pasha, in 1886. His position was not a dignified one but that of a titular ruler compelled to stand by while others discussed and managed the affairs of his country. The Sultan was his suzerain; in Britain he recognized his protector: to the representative of each he endeavoured to show friendliness and esteem. As time went on his confidence in Baring increased, until at last he deferred to the British agent in almost everything. On occasion, however, he acted on his own initiative, as when in June 1888 he dismissed Nubar Pasha and summoned Riad Pasha to form a ministry, an action influenced, nevertheless, by Tewfik's knowledge of the divergence of views between Nubar and the British agent. Baring encouraged Tewfik to show his activity in matters of administration, and he took a great interest in all matters connected with irrigation, education and justice. He was not an imposing man, but he showed a genuine desire to govern his country for its own benefit. He understood the importance to Egypt of British assistance and support; his natural shrewdness made him accept the British conditions; his natural good feeling kept him from any inclination to intrigue.

== Personal life ==
In Cairo on 15 January 1873 he married Princess Emina Ilhamy (Constantinople, 24 May 1858 – Bebek, Istanbul, 19 June 1931), daughter of Prince Ibrahim al-Hami and Parlanta Qadin. He was courteous, amiable and had no desire to keep up the unapproachable state of an oriental ruler. His marriage in 1873 to his ethnic Albanian kinswoman, Emina Ilhamy, proved very happy. She was his only wife and Tewfik was a strong advocate of monogamy. When Tewfik ascended the throne, he closed the harem quarters in the imperial palace, and sold all of his father's female slaves to slave markets.

== Death ==
He died on 7 January 1892 of influenza, at the Helwan Palace near Cairo, and was succeeded by his eldest son, Abbas II.

== Issue ==
By his wife he had the following children:

- Abbas Hilmi II Pasha, Khedive of Egypt;
- Prince Mohammed Ali Tewfik (Kubba Palace, Cairo, 9 November 1875 – Lausanne, Switzerland, 18 March 1955, and buried in Khedive Tawfik Mausoleum, Kait Bey, Cairo);
- Princess Nazli Hanim (11 April 1877 – Cairo, c. 1879);
- Princess Fakhr un-nisa Khadija Hanim (Cairo, 21 May 1880 – Helwan, 22 February 1951);
- Princess Nimatullah Hanim (Cairo, 23 October 1882 – Nice, France, c. 1965, and buried there at the cimetière de Caucade).

== Honours ==
- (Austria-Hungary) Knight of the Order of the Iron Crown, 1st Class, 1868
- (Ottoman Empire) Order of Honour, Imtiyaz Medal, 1868
- (Ottoman Empire) Order of the Osmans, Nishan-i-Osmania, 1868
- (Ottoman Empire) Order of Nobility, 1868
- (Sweden) Commander Grand Cross of the Order of Vasa, 17 December 1868
- Grand Cross of the Order of the Red Eagle, 29 January 1870
- (Grand Duchy of Oldenburg) Grand Cross of the House and Merit Order of Peter Frederick Louis, 5 February 1875
- (United Kingdom) Honorary Grand Commander of the Order of the Star of India, 3 May 1875
- (Hawaiian Kingdom) Grand Cross of the Royal Order of Kalākaua I, 1881
- (Kingdom of Italy) Grand Cross of the Order of Saints Maurice and Lazarus, 1886
- (Austria-Hungary) Grand Cross of the Order of Franz Joseph, 1886
- (United Kingdom) Honorary Grand Cross of the Order of the Bath (civil division), 21 June 1887
- Grand Cross of the Order of the Netherlands Lion, 1890
- (French Third Republic) Grand Cross of the Légion d'honneur, 1890
- (Sweden) Knight of the Order of the Seraphim, 18 April 1891

== Notes ==
Tewfik Pasha Muhammad Ali Dynasty Born: 1852 Died: 1892
Preceded by Ismail	Khedive of Egypt and Sudan; 1879–1892	Succeeded by Abbas II
