= Bebek Bay =

Bay in Beşiktaş, Istanbul, Turkey

Coordinates: 41.076°N 29.045°E

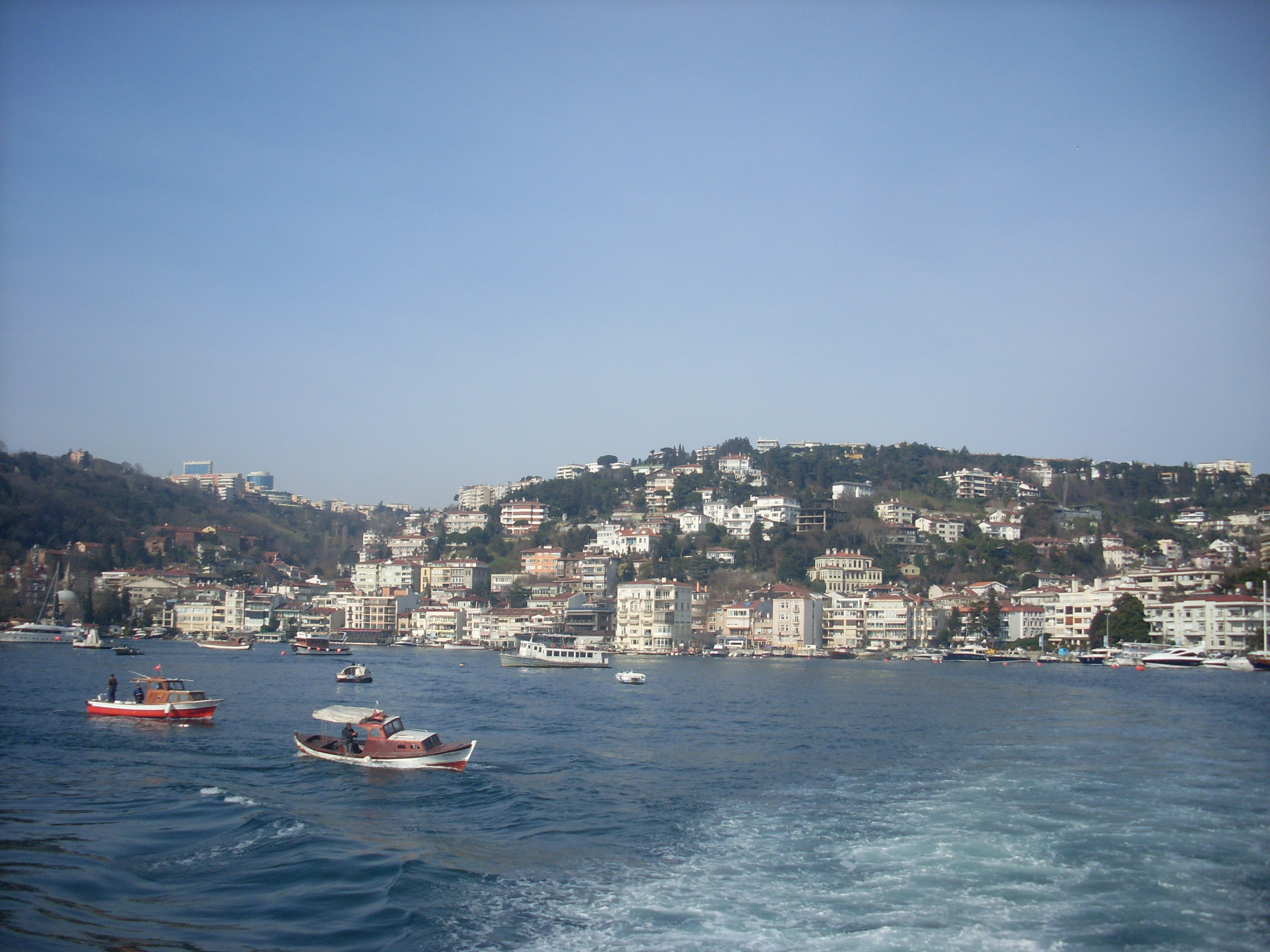

Bebek Bay is a small bay on the Bosphorus, in the Beşiktaş district of Istanbul. It was formerly a resort area that was home to a palace of the Ottoman sultan.

== See also ==
- Bebek, Istanbul
