= Abbas I of Egypt =

Wāli of Egypt and Sudan from 1848 to 1854

Abbas Hilmi I Pasha
- عباس حلمي الأول
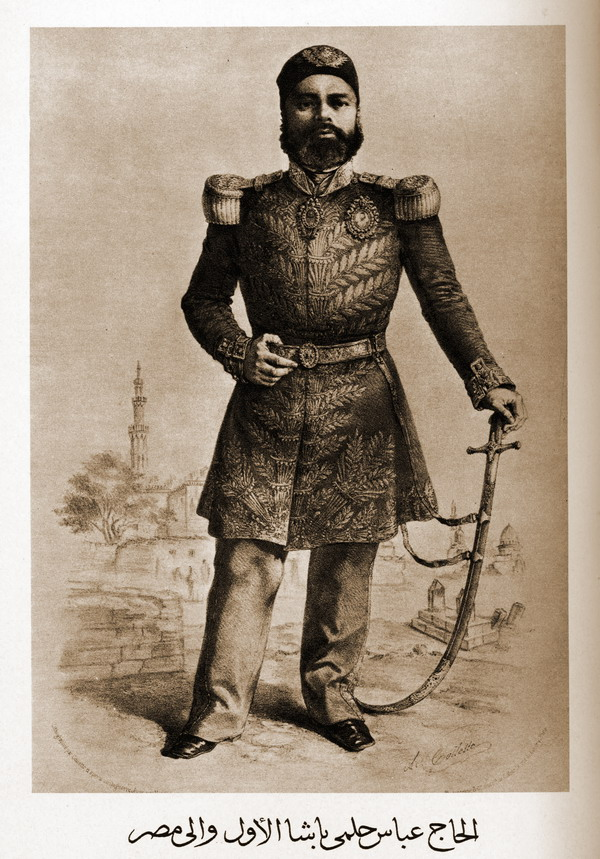

Wāli of Egypt
- In office 10 November 1848 – 13 July 1854
- Monarch: Abdülmecid I
- Preceded by: Ibrahim Pasha
- Succeeded by: Mohamed Sa'id Pasha

Personal details
- Born: 1 July 1812 Jeddah, First Saudi state
- Died: 13 July 1854 (aged 42) Banha, Egypt Eyalet, Ottoman Empire
- Resting place: Hosh al-Basha Mausoleum of Imam al-Shafi'i, Cairo, Egypt
- Spouse(s): Mahivech Hanim; Shazdil Qadin; Hawaya Qadin; Hamdam Qadin; Parlanta Qadin
- Children: Prince Ibrahim Ilhami Pasha; Prince Mustafa Bey; Princess Havva Hanim; Prince Muhammad Sadik Bey; Princess Aysha Sidika Hanim
- Parents: Tusun Pasha (father); Bamba Qadin (mother)
- House: Alawiyya
- Religion: Sunni Islam

Abbas Helmy I of Egypt (also known as Abbas Pasha, Arabic: عباس الأول, Turkish: I. Abbas Hilmi Paşa; 1 July 1812 – 13 July 1854) was the wāli of Egypt during 1848–1854. He was a son of Tusun Pasha, the younger son of Muhammad Ali Pasha whom he succeeded as de facto ruler of Egypt and Sudan.

The Chambers Biographical Dictionary says of him: "[b]igoted and sensual, he did much to undo the progress made under Muhammad Ali."

== Early years ==
Abbas was born on 1 July 1812 in Jeddah and was brought up in Cairo. Being the grandson of Muhammad Ali, he succeeded his uncle Ibrahim Pasha in ruling Egypt and Sudan in 1848.

As a young man, he fought in the Levant under his uncle Ibrahim Pasha in the Syrian War. Muhammad Ali Pasha was removed from office on 1 September 1848, on account of mental weakness. He was replaced by his son Ibrahim Pasha, who reigned briefly as regent of Egypt and Sudan from 1 September 1848 until his death on 10 November 1848. The death of Ibrahim made Abbas I, in turn, Regent of Egypt and Sudan from 10 November 1848 until 2 August 1849 (the date of Muhammad Ali Pasha's death), at which time Abbas became the reigning Wāli of Egypt and Sudan until 13 July 1854.

== Ruler of Egypt ==
Abbas has been often described as a mere voluptuary, but Nubar Pasha spoke of him as a true gentleman of the "old school". He was seen as reactionary, morose and taciturn, and spent nearly all his time in his palace. He undid, as far as lay in his power, the works of his grandfather, both good and bad. Among other things, he abolished trade monopolies, closed factories and schools, and reduced the strength of the region's army to 9,000 men. He also shut down construction of the Delta Dam and opposed the construction of the Suez Canal.

A 1886 study wrote of Abbas that he "undertook no great works, built no new canals, and did not even carry out the schemes and plans of his predecessors. Abbas has been called a bigot and a miser. He certainly was neither liberal in mind nor lavish with money."

== Foreign relations ==
Abbas was inaccessible to adventurers bent on plundering Egypt and Sudan of riches, and kicked out all foreign business. British trade policy became openly antagonistic as a result, severely restricting corn exports out of Egyptian markets. However, at the insistence of the British Government, he allowed the construction of a railway from Alexandria to Cairo. In return, the British assisted him in a dispute with the Ottoman Empire.

Due to his negative policies towards Europeans and their influence, Abbas was not liked by them and in time his reputation was exaggerated and demonized to portray him as worse than he actually was. After he died the number of Europeans in Egypt rose drastically from 3,000, in 1850, to 90,000, in 1882, and 200,000 by 1900.

== Crimean War ==
During the Crimean War Abbas gave the Ottoman sultan, Abdulmejid I, use of his naval fleet of 12 warships as well as 19,000 troops and 72 guns. Abbas also recruited much of this new army from the Sinai Peninsula, traveling to El Tor and Aqaba and meeting with local Bedouin chiefs to conscript men, especially cavalry, for the war. The number of troops was later increased to between 40,000 and 55,000 by late October, 1853.

== Horse breeding ==
Among Abbas' personal interests was the breeding of Arabian horses, which was said to be the overriding passion of his life. He continued a breeding program begun by Muhammad Ali. His development and acquisition of quality bloodlines had an immense influence on modern horse breeding. Muhammad Ali and Abbas both recognized the unique characteristics and paid careful attention to bloodlines of the horses bred by the Bedouin tribes. At age 23, Abbas had been put in charge of the horse breeding program of his grandfather. Upon becoming Wāli, Abbas accumulated additional horses and carefully documented the histories of the animals and their bloodlines, records which have been preserved into the present day. Through a connection with Faisal Ibn Saud, for whom Abbas was said to have engineered an escape from a prison where he had been held, Abbas obtained a number of horses from the Nejd. He also paid very high prices for mares of the best bloodlines from the Anazeh people. He built extensive stables for these horses in three different locations, including a stud farm said to have cost £1,000,000 to build, and hired native Bedouins to oversee the care of the horses and to maintain information on their bloodlines. He spared no expense in the care of his horses. At one stud farm he kept 300 camels to provide extra milk for the young foals.

== Death ==
On 13 July 1854, Abbas was murdered in the Benha Palace by two of his slaves. It was said that his cruelty to his servants was a motive for the murder. For example, Arabian horse breeder Lady Anne Blunt was told that Abbas had once ordered a hot horseshoe to be nailed to the foot of a horse groom who had neglected the care of a horse's hooves.

Abbas was succeeded by his uncle (who was actually younger than him), Said Pasha.

Following Abbas' assassination, his Arabian horses were inherited by his eighteen-year-old son, Ibrahim Ilhami Pasha who showed little interest in them, giving away several and putting the rest up for auction. In 1861, a distant relative, Ali Pasha Sherif purchased approximately 40 horses of the original Abbas Pasha stock and rebuilt the horse breeding program.

== Honours ==
Honours
year	name	Nation	Ribbon
1849	Order of the August Portrait	Ottoman Empire	
1849	Order of Glory	Ottoman Empire	
1853	Order of Nobility, 1st Class	Ottoman Empire	
	Order of Saints Maurice and Lazarus, Grand Cross	Kingdom of Sardinia	

== Footnotes ==
Abbas I of Egypt Muhammad Ali Dynasty Born: 1 July 1812 Died: 13 July 1854
Preceded by Ibrahim Pasha	Wāli of Egypt and Sudan; 1848–1854	Succeeded by Sa'id Pasha
