= List of monarchs of the Muhammad Ali dynasty =

Monarchs of Egypt and Sudan
- Royal Coat of arms

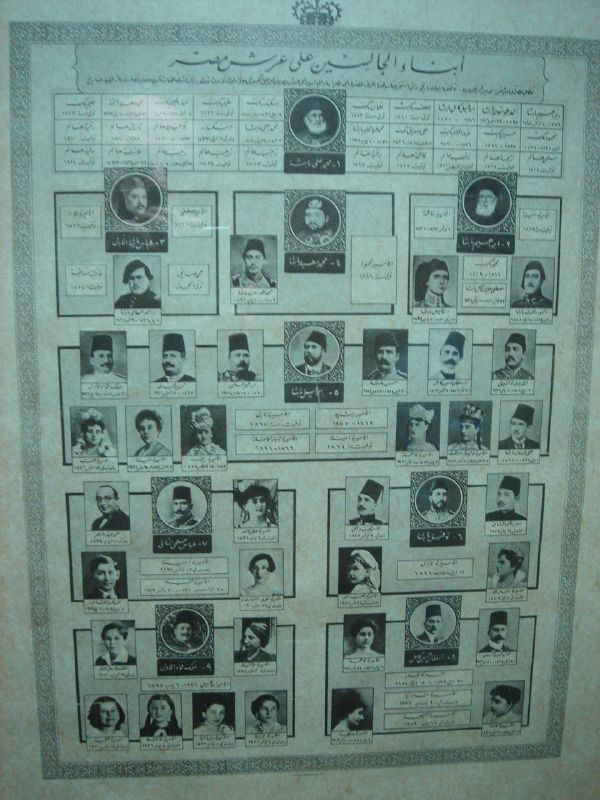
- Montage of monarchs and their offspring

Details
- Style: Wāli (unrecognised Khedive) of Egypt (1805–1867); Khedive of Egypt (1867–1914); Sultan of Egypt (1914–1922); King of Egypt (1922–1951); King of Egypt and the Sudan (1951–1953)
- First monarch: Muhammad Ali Pasha
- Last monarch: Fuad II
- Formed: 17 May 1805
- Abolished: 18 June 1953
- Residences: Cairo Citadel (1805–1874); Abdeen Palace (1874–1952)
- Pretender: Fuad II

Egyptian Royal Standard

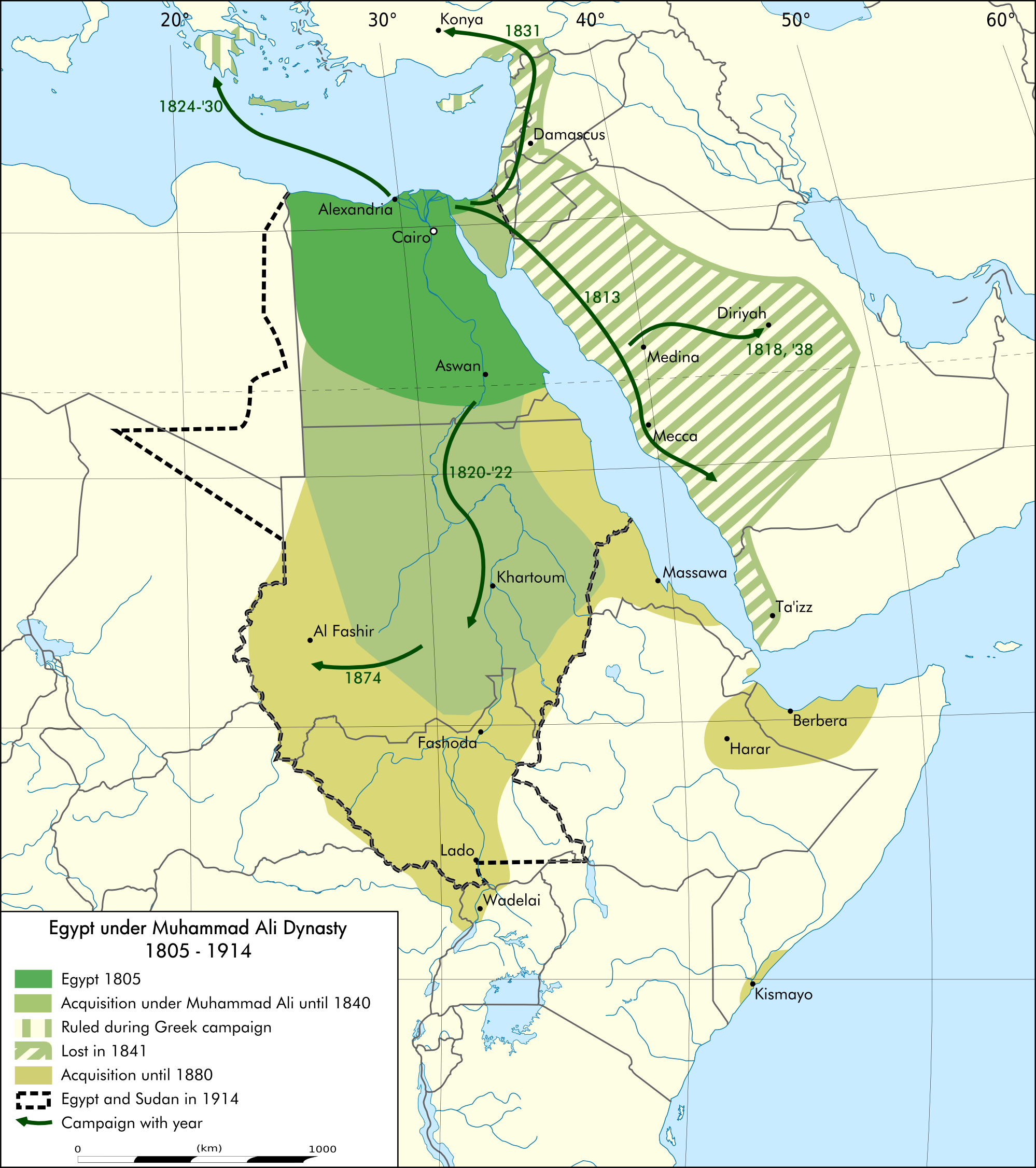
Map of Egypt under the Muhammad Ali dynasty; it shows military campaigns of Muhammad Ali.

Monarchs of the Muhammad Ali dynasty reigned over Egypt from 1805 to 1953. Their rule also extended to Sudan throughout much of this period, as well as to the Levant, and Hejaz during the first half of the nineteenth century. The Muhammad Ali dynasty was founded by Pasha Muhammad Ali, an Albanian commander in the expeditionary force sent by the Ottoman Empire in 1801 to dislodge the French occupation of Egypt led by Napoleon Bonaparte. The defeat and departure of the French left a power vacuum in Egypt, which had been an Ottoman province since the sixteenth century, but in which the pre-Ottoman Mamluk military caste maintained considerable power. After a three-way political conflict, and with the help of an alliance with Egyptian political leader Umar Makram, Muhammad Ali managed to consolidate his control over Egypt, and declared himself Khedive of the country. The Ottoman government refused to acknowledge this title, instead recognizing Muhammad Ali by the more junior title of Wāli (roughly equivalent to a governor or viceroy) on 17 May 1805, making Muhammad Ali the successor to Hurshid Pasha in that position. In the years following his consolidation of power, Muhammad Ali extended Egypt's borders southwards into Sudan, and eastwards into the Arab-majority Mashriq, particularly the Levant. In 1840, his demand for hereditary control of Egypt and Sudan to be passed to his heirs and successors was accepted and confirmed by the Convention of London, but he was compelled to agree that, upon his death, control over his territories in the Mashreq would revert to the Porte.

Muhammad Ali had a 43-year reign, the longest in the history of modern Egypt. Termed the "father of modern Egypt," he is viewed in Egyptian historiography as the dynasty's most important ruler, due to his massive agricultural, administrative, and military reforms. His son, Ibrahim Pasha, was the shortest-reigning monarch of the dynasty. The duration of his rule varies from one source to another, depending on whether or not his reign as regent is taken into account. Contrary to what the short length of his reign might suggest, Ibrahim Pasha was far from being a historically negligible figure, although most of his significant achievements were made before his accession to the throne. His successor, Abbas Helmi I, a traditionalist described by Lord Cromer as "an Oriental despot of the worst type," reverted many of his predecessors' reform-minded measures, and is considered the most controversial ruler of his family.

Sa'id Pasha and Isma'il Pasha were far more open to Western influence, and continued the process of expansion and modernization set up by Muhammad Ali, but on a more lavish scale. Isma'il Pasha is especially notable for his inauguration of the Suez Canal and for his Haussmann-inspired reconscrution of Cairo. However, his costly policy of Europeanisation left the country bankrupt; as a consequence, European creditors greatly expanded their influence over Egypt and Sudan's internal affairs. Isma'il's son, Tewfik Pasha, became increasingly powerless following the Urabi revolt, and was turned into a figurehead ruler following the establishment of British control in 1882. After his death, his son, Abbas Helmi II, tried unsuccessfully to detach himself from the influence of the British, who ended up deposing him in 1914. The following reign, that of Hussein Kamel, lasted only three years and was thus little more than an interregnum. Hussein Kamel's successor Fuad I was a far more historically significant figure. Described by historian Philip Mansel as "the last great royal patron of history," his reign was marked by the Egyptian Revolution of 1919, and the United Kingdom's resultant recognition of Egyptian independence. The British, however, refused to include Sudan within the sphere of this recognition, and continued to abide by the terms of the Anglo-Egyptian Condominium. Fuad's son, Farouk I, was Egypt and Sudan's penultimate monarch. After his forced abdication following the Egyptian Revolution of 1952, his infant son Fuad II continued to reign as a nominal king-in-exile until the monarchy was formally abolished on 18 June 1953.^{[b]}

Rulers of the Muhammad Ali Dynasty governed Egypt and Sudan as absolute monarchs until constitutional rule was established in August 1878. Following the dissolution of the Ottoman Empire, the Egyptian and Sudanese monarchy emerged as the most important in the Middle East and the wider Arab world. Finding themselves as mere figureheads during the period of British control, Egypt and Sudan's monarchs saw their powers increased following the recognition of independence, and the subsequent adoption of the 1923 Constitution, the most liberal in the country's history. Although King Fuad I often ruled as an autocrat, partly because he repeatedly overrode some provisions of the Constitution, Egypt and Sudan had the freest parliament in the region. During Fuad's reign and that of his son, Farouk, the country witnessed six free parliamentary elections and enjoyed a free press as well as an independent judiciary. According to historian Philip Mansel, "the Egyptian monarchy appeared so splendid, powerful and popular that King Farouk's ignominious end seems inexplicable." The Muhammad Ali Dynasty's downfall is often regarded as having begun with the Abdeen Palace Incident of 1942, which greatly discredited the King. It accelerated with the growing discontent of the Egyptian Armed Forces following the country's defeat in the First Arab-Israeli War. Disgruntled members of the military formed the Free Officers Movement, which led a coup d'état on 23 July 1952, thereby marking the beginning of the Egyptian Revolution of 1952. The toppling of the monarchy, and the resultant establishment of a revolutionary republican government, was the first of its kind in the modern Arab world, and was a crucial event in the region's history; it accelerated dramatically the rise of Pan-Arabism, and had a domino effect leading to similar military overthrows of the monarchies of Iraq (1958), North Yemen (1962), and Libya (1969). Egypt has had a republican form of government since the end of monarchical rule. Although the establishment of genuine democratic rule was one of the six core principles of the Revolution, political parties were banned in 1953 and the country was turned into a military dictatorship. The thriving pluralism that characterized political life during the latter period of the Muhammad Ali Dynasty's rule was thus brought to an end. Even though a multi-party system was officially restored in Egypt in 1976, the country has never recovered the level of political freedom it had enjoyed during the monarchy. In common with most deposed royal families, the Muhammad Ali Dynasty was initially vilified by the new revolutionary regime. Nonetheless, it has undergone re-evaluation in recent years; nostalgia for the former monarchy has been growing among some in Egypt, largely fuelled by the airing in 2007 of a hugely successful serial about the life of King Farouk I.

== List of monarchs (1805–1953) ==
Status

Denotes Regent

=== Wilayah/Unrecognised Khedivate (1805–1867) ===
From 1805 to 1867, Egypt remained legally a nominal Ottoman province governed by a Wāli on behalf of the Ottoman Sultan, although it was de facto virtually independent, with its wālis styling themselves as Khedives. Despite their legally subservient status, Egypt's wālis enjoyed far more political power than their descendants, who were to rule the country as nominally independent sultans and kings decades later. Throughout the 19th century, the legal fiction of Ottoman suzerainty was nonetheless symbolically maintained through Egypt's payment of an annual tribute. Moreover, although the Muhammad Ali Dynasty became a hereditary monarchy in 1840, each new ruler had to receive a firman (Arabic word for decree) from the Ottoman Sultan appointing him as Wāli in order to be formally invested with his office. Until 1866, Egypt's laws of succession followed the principle of agnatic seniority, which means that the reigning wāli always had to be the eldest male member of the dynasty. Rulers thus inherited the throne based on their age, not on their degree of proximity. This explains why none of Ibrahim Pasha's successors was directly succeeded by his own son.

No.	Portrait	Name (Birth–Death)	Reign			Claim (relationship with predecessor)
No.	Portrait	Name (Birth–Death)	Reign start	Reign end	Duration	Claim (relationship with predecessor)
1		Muhammad Ali; Pasha (1769–1849)	17 May 1805	20 July 1848	43 years, 64 days	Rose to power in the Eyalet of Egypt
—		Ibrahim; Pasha (1789–1848)	15 April 1848	20 July 1848^{[c]}	96 days	Regent; For Muhammad Ali; Pasha
2		Ibrahim; Pasha (1789–1848)	20 July 1848	10 November 1848	113 days	Presumed son of Muhammad Ali^{[d]} Pasha
3		Abbas Helmi I Pasha (1812–1854)	10 November 1848	13 July 1854 (Assassinated)^{[e]}	5 years, 245 days	Nephew of Ibrahim; Pasha
4		Muhammad Sa'id; Pasha (1822–1863)	13 July 1854	17 January 1863	8 years, 188 days	Half-uncle of Abbas Helmi I Pasha
5		Isma'il; Pasha (1830–1895)	19 January 1863	8 June 1867	4 years, 140 days	Half-nephew of Muhammad Sa'id; Pasha

=== Khedivate (1867–1914) ===
On 8 June 1867, Ottoman Sultan Abdülaziz formally recognized Isma'il Pasha by the title Khedive, which ranked higher than that of Vizier but lower than that of Caliph. The Khedivate of Egypt was still nominally a subject of the Ottoman Sultan, and its rulers were still technically appointed and dismissed by an imperial firman. Nevertheless, the Khedive actually exercised most sovereign powers, including the appointment of his council of ministers, the rector of Al-Azhar, and high-ranking military and naval officers. He could also sign treaties with foreign powers and borrow money for the state treasury. On 17 May 1866, the rule of succession in Egypt was changed from one based on agnatic seniority to one based on male primogeniture in the direct line of Isma'il Pasha. After the British occupied the country in 1882, the Khedive's exercise of power was limited greatly on the advice of the British agent and consul general, who became the de facto ruler of the country.

No.	Portrait	Name (Birth–Death)	Reign			Claim (relationship with predecessor)
No.	Portrait	Name (Birth–Death)	Reign start	Reign end	Duration	Claim (relationship with predecessor)
(5)		Isma'il; Pasha (1830–1895)	8 June 1867	26 June 1879 (Deposed)	12 years, 18 days	Half-nephew of Muhammad Sa'id; Pasha
6		Muhammad Tawfiq; Pasha (1852–1892)	26 June 1879	7 January 1892	12 years, 195 days	Son of Isma'il; Pasha
7		Abbas Helmi II; Pasha (1874–1944)	8 January 1892	19 December 1914 (Deposed)^{[f]}	22 years, 345 days	Son of Muhammad Tawfiq; Pasha

=== Sultanate (1914–1922) ===
On 19 December 1914, Abbas Helmi II was deposed by the British government while he was on a visit to Vienna due to his anti-British stance. The British severed Egypt's nominal ties to the Ottoman Empire, thus ending the country's status as a khedivate. Prime Minister Hussein Rushdi Pasha served as acting head of state until Abbas Helmi II's half-uncle Hussein Kamel was chosen as the country's new monarch. For a brief while, the British had considered putting an end to the Muhammad Ali Dynasty and installing Aga Khan III as ruler. Hussein Kamel took the title of Sultan of Egypt (preceded by the style of Sa Hautesse or His Highness), thereby putting him on an equal footing with the Ottoman Sultan. However, the end of nominal Ottoman suzerainty over Egypt did not result in genuine independence; the Sultanate of Egypt was a British protectorate where real power lay in the hand of the High Commissioner.

No.	Portrait	Name (Birth–Death)	Reign			Claim (relationship with predecessor)
No.	Portrait	Name (Birth–Death)	Reign start	Reign end	Duration	Claim (relationship with predecessor)
8		Hussein Kamel (1853–1917)	19 December 1914	9 October 1917	2 years, 294 days	Half-uncle of Abbas Helmi II; Pasha
9		Ahmed Fuad I (1868–1936)	9 October 1917	15 March 1922	4 years, 157 days	Half-brother of Hussein Kamel

=== Kingdom (1922–1953) ===
On 28 February 1922, the United Kingdom issued a declaration through which it unilaterally ended its protectorate over Egypt. As a result, Sultan Fuad I promulgated a decree on 15 March 1922 whereby he adopted the title of King of Egypt. It has been reported that the title change was due not only to Egypt's newly independent status as the Kingdom of Egypt, but also to Fuad I's desire to be accorded the same title as the newly installed rulers of the newly created kingdoms of Hejaz, Syria and Iraq.

Egyptian independence was limited severely by the continuing British presence in the country. British influence in Egypt remained strong, as evidenced by the 1942 Abdeen Palace incident, which almost led to Farouk I's forced abdication. In October 1951, Prime Minister Mustafa el-Nahhas introduced, and Parliament approved, decrees unilaterally abrogating the Anglo-Egyptian Treaty of 1936 and proclaiming Farouk I King of Egypt and the Sudan. The move was intended to further Egypt's claims over Sudan, which had been governed as an Anglo-Egyptian condominium since 1899.

No.	Portrait	Name (Birth–Death)	Reign			Claim (relationship with predecessor)
No.	Portrait	Name (Birth–Death)	Reign start	Reign end	Duration	Claim (relationship with predecessor)
(9)		Ahmed Fuad I (1868–1936)	15 March 1922	28 April 1936	14 years, 44 days	Half-brother of Hussein Kamel
—		Prince; Mohammed Ali Tewfik (1875–1955); Chairman	8 May 1936	29 July 1937^{[g]}	1 year, 82 days	Regency Council; For Farouk I
—		Aziz Ezzat; Pasha (1869–1961)	8 May 1936	29 July 1937^{[g]}	1 year, 82 days	Regency Council; For Farouk I
—		Sherif Sabri; Pasha (1895–?)	8 May 1936	29 July 1937^{[g]}	1 year, 82 days	Regency Council; For Farouk I
10		Farouk I (1920–1965)	28 April 1936	26 July 1952 (Forced to abdicate by revolution)	16 years, 89 days	Son of Ahmed Fuad I
11		Ahmed Fuad II (born 1952)	26 July 1952	18 June 1953 (Deposed)^{[b]}	327 days	Son of Farouk I
—		Aly Maher; Pasha (1882–1960); Prime Minister	26 July 1952	2 August 1952	7 days	Cabinet; For Ahmed Fuad II
—		Prince; Muhammad Abdel Moneim (1899–1979); Chairman	2 August 1952	14 October 1952	73 days	Regency Council; For Ahmed Fuad II
—		Bahey El Din Barakat; Pasha (1889–1972)	2 August 1952	14 October 1952	73 days	Regency Council; For Ahmed Fuad II
—		Colonel; Rashad Mehanna (1909–1996)	2 August 1952	14 October 1952	73 days	Regency Council; For Ahmed Fuad II
—		Prince; Muhammad Abdel Moneim (1899–1979)	14 October 1952	18 June 1953 (Deposed)^{[b]}	247 days	Regent; For Ahmed Fuad II

== See also ==
- Muhammad Ali dynasty family tree
- History of Egypt under the Muhammad Ali dynasty
- List of Ottoman governors of Egypt, for a list of governors until Muhammad Ali
- Lists of rulers of Egypt
- List of Sunni dynasties

== Notes ==
a^{1} ^{2} : The July 1952 Revolution did not immediately lead to the abolition of the monarchy. King Farouk I abdicated in favour of his six-month-old son Ahmad Fuad, who ascended the throne as King Fuad II. However, the latter only reigned as a nominal king-in-exile. Initially, his powers were assumed during a week by the Cabinet, headed at the time by Ali Maher Pasha. On 2 August 1952, a temporary regency "body" (not a formal Regency Council) was created. Headed by Prince Muhammad Abdel Moneim (son of the late Khedive Abbas Helmi II and Fuad II's second cousin), the three-member Regency Body also included Bahey El Din Barakat Pasha (a former Minister of Education and Speaker of Parliament) and Rashad Mehanna (a colonel appointed as representative of the Army). The Regency Body was dissolved on 14 October 1952, and Prince Muhammad Abdel Moneim was appointed as sole Prince regent. However, throughout this period, real powers lay in the hands of the Revolutionary Command Council. The monarchy was formally abolished on 18 June 1953: Egypt was declared a republic for the first time in its history, and Muhammad Naguib became its first ever President.
b: Ibrahim Pasha presided the Regency Council that was formed on 15 April 1848 to run Egypt due to Muhammad Ali Pasha's declining physical and mental health. Legal documents were still written in the latter's name; however, Ibrahim Pasha became the de facto ruler of the country from this moment on. On 20 July of the same year, an extraordinary envoy of Ottoman Sultan Abdülmecid I arrived in Alexandria with the firman by which the Porte recognized Ibrahim Pasha as Egypt's new wāli. The latter then travelled to Istanbul, where his investiture took place on 25 August in the presence of the Ottoman Sultan. However, his reign was very brief, and his death occurred shortly after his return to Cairo. He died on 10 November 1848 due to ill health, thus predeceasing his father.
c: Ibrahim Pasha is generally presumed to be the eldest son of Muhammad Ali Pasha, and is considered as such in official genealogies. However, doubts have always surrounded the identity of his true father. It has been reported that his ties with Muhammad Ali Pasha were clouded by the latter's suspicion that he was not truly Ibrahim's father. Abbas Helmi I, eager to change the law of succession in favor of his son and to bypass Ibrahim Pasha's children, tried to discredit the latter by spreading a rumour that Ibrahim was the son of Muhammad Ali's wife from a previous marriage to her tutor.
d: Abbas Helmi I's assassination remains unclear. The cause of his death in Banha on 13 July 1854 has never been explained, but it is thought that he was murdered by two mamluks sent to him from Istanbul by his aunt, who sought revenge because of a dispute over his heirs' inheritance.
e: Abbas Helmi II continued to claim Egypt's throne after his deposition by the British. On 12 May 1931, he finally abdicated by officially signing a document in which he stated: "Whereas I recognise that His Majesty King Fuad I, son of Ismail, is the legitimate king of Egypt, I hereby declare my renunciation of all claims of any nature, past or future, emanating from having been khedive of Egypt." As a gesture of reconciliation, the Egyptian government decided to grant Abbas Helmi II an annual stipend of LE 30,000 and issued him an official Egyptian passport, although he was still barred from entering Egypt and would spend the rest of his life in exile.
f: Farouk I was still a minor when his father died on 28 April 1936. His powers were thus initially assumed by a three-member Regency Council, which was chaired by Prince Muhammad Ali (son of the late Khedive Tawfiq Pasha and thus first cousin of King Farouk I) and also included Aziz Ezzat Pasha (a former Foreign Minister married to Behiye Yakan Hanem, another cousin of Farouk I) and Sherif Sabri Pasha (Farouk I's maternal uncle). The Council was formally sworn in on 8 May 1936 in front of a joint session of Parliament. King Farouk I assumed his full constitutional powers upon reaching his age of majority (fixed at 18 years and calculated according to the Islamic calendar) on 29 July 1937.

== Bibliography ==
- El Ansary, Dr. Nasser (2001). "Mohamed 'Ali et sa dynastie". L'Encyclopédie des souverains d'Egypte des Pharaons à nos jours (in French). Alleur-Liège: Editions du Perron. pp. 119–125. ISBN 978-2-87114-173-0. OCLC 47267647.
- Goldschmidt, Arthur (2000). Biographical Dictionary of Modern Egypt. American University in Cairo Press. ISBN 978-977-424-579-4. OCLC 237384904.
- Goldschmidt, Arthur; Johnston, Robert (2004). Historical Dictionary of Egypt (3rd ed.). American University in Cairo Press. ISBN 978-977-424-875-7. OCLC 58833952.
- Hassan, Hassan (2000). In the House of Muhammad Ali: A Family Album, 1805–1952. American University in Cairo Press. ISBN 978-977-424-554-1. OCLC 45016821.
- Ibrahim, Prince Osman; Kurhan, Caroline; Kurhan, Ali (2005). Méhémet Ali le grand: Mémoires intimes d'une dynastie, 1805–2005 (in French). Paris: Maisonneuve et Larose. ISBN 978-2-7068-1858-5. OCLC 58943364.
- Mansel, Philip (2000). Sultans in Splendour. London: Parkway Publishing. ISBN 978-1-898259-45-9. OCLC 234132026.
- Montgomery-Massingberd, Hugh, ed. (1980). "The Royal House of Egypt". Burke's Royal Families of the World. Vol. II: Africa & the Middle East. London: Burke's Peerage. pp. 20–37. ISBN 978-0-85011-029-6. OCLC 18496936.
- Sinoué, Gilbert (1997). Le dernier pharaon: Méhémet-Ali, 1770–1849 (in French). Paris: Pygmalion/Gérard Watelet. ISBN 978-2-85704-517-5. OCLC 38566144.

— Royal house — Muhammad Ali Dynasty
Preceded by Ottoman Dynasty (Sultans represented by Wālis)	Ruling house of Egypt; 1805–1953	Succeeded by Presidents of Egypt (Proclamation of Republic)
Preceded by Funj Dynasty as Rulers of the Sultanate of Sennar	Ruling house of Sudan (represented by governors-general); 1821–1885; Mahdist interregnum 1899–1953	Anglo-Egyptian Sudan Agreement
Preceded by Keira Dynasty as Rulers of the Sultanate of Darfur	Ruling house of Darfur; 1874–1882; Mahdist interregnum followed by rule of Ali Dinar; 1916–1953	Anglo-Egyptian Sudan Agreement
