= Prince Abbas Hilmi =

Egyptian prince

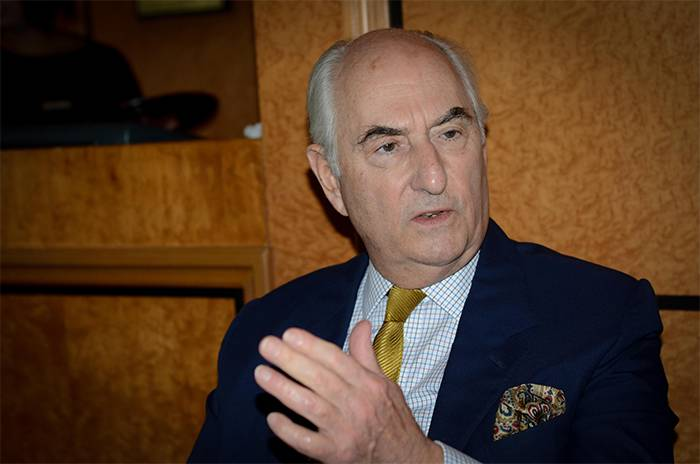
- Born: 16 October 1941 (age 84); Cairo, Kingdom of Egypt
- Spouse: Mediha Momtaz (m. 1969)
- Issue: Sabiha Fatma; Daoud Abdel Moneim
- House: House of Muhammad Ali (paternal); House of Osman (maternal)
- Father: Prince Muhammad Abdel Moneim
- Mother: Princess Fatma Neslişah
- Religion: Sunni Islam
- Occupation: Financial manager

Styles of Abbas Hilmi
- Reference style: His Royal Highness
- Spoken style: Your Royal Highness

Prince Abbas Hilmi (Arabic: الأمير عباس حلمي بن الأمير محمد عبد المنعم بن الخديوي عباس حلمي باشا الثاني; born 16 October 1941) is an Egyptian and Ottoman prince and financial manager. A member of the Muhammad Ali Dynasty, he is the only son of Prince Muhammad Abdel Moneim and his Ottoman wife Princess Neslişah, and grandson of Khedive Abbas Hilmi II Bey.

== Early life ==
Born in Cairo in 1941, Prince Abbas Hilmi was named after his paternal grandfather Abbas Hilmi II, the last khedive of Egypt. This lineage represented the most senior male branch descended from Isma'il Pasha, and thus first in the line of succession to the Egyptian throne by virtue of the 1866 rules of succession. However, those rules were suspended by the British upon their proclamation of a protectorate over Egypt in 1914. Abbas Hilmi II was deposed, and his son Muhammad Abdel Moneim lost his place as heir apparent. The throne passed to Abbas Hilmi II's uncles Hussein Kamel and Fuad I. The Royal Edict of 13 April 1922 specifically excluded Abbas Hilmi II from the succession, although it stated that "this exception shall not apply to his sons and their progeny." This meant that Prince Muhammad Abdel Moneim and his son Prince Abbas Hilmi remained eligible for the throne and retained a senior position in the order of precedence of the Kingdom of Egypt.

Prince Abbas Hilmi's two great-grandfathers on his mother's side were Mehmed VI, the last Ottoman sultan, and Abdülmecid II, the last Ottoman caliph. Had the Ottoman monarchy not been abolished in 1922, Prince Abbas Hilmi would have received, in addition to his Egyptian princely title (Arabic: أمير, romanized: Amir), the Ottoman title of sultanzade, which was given to the sons of imperial princesses.

In July 1952, the Free Officers launched a revolution that led to the forced abdication of King Farouk of Egypt in favour of his infant son King Fuad II. Due to Fuad II's minority, Prince Muhammad Abdel Moneim was chosen by the new military rulers to serve as regent, first as head of a temporary regency body and later as sole prince regent. However, he did not last long in the position, as the Egyptian monarchy was officially abolished on 18 June 1953. Prince Muhammad Abdel Moneim and his wife Neslişah were arrested in 1957 and accused of taking part in an anti-Nasser plot. Their souring relations with the new revolutionary regime forced them into exile. As a result, their son Prince Abbas Hilmi spent much of his life in England and France.

== Business activities ==
Educated at Millfield school in Street, Somerset, Prince Abbas Hilmi pursued his higher studies at Christ Church, Oxford. He worked for a discount house, a bank and an insurance broker before joining Grieveson Grant & Co. in 1968. He remained with Grieveson Grant & Co., one of the City's top stockbrokers, until 1981. In 1970, he made history by becoming the first foreign member of the London Stock Exchange, his election having been rendered possible by a change of Rule 21, which had previously restricted membership to British citizens. After leaving Grieveson Grant & Co., Prince Abbas Hilmi became a general manager of Schroder Asseily & Co. (1981–1983), and then Chairman of Hilmi and Associates (1983–1986), where he was mostly engaged in financial management activities and project finance assignments. After spending three years in London as Vice-President of Kidder, Peabody & Co. (1986–1989), he joined the Concord Group in 1989, only one year after its establishment. He was part of the three-member team that launched the Concord Group's Cairo office in 1994. Since then, Egypt has become the group's main focus area, with more than half of the assets it manages ($2.8 billion out of $3.4 billion) being invested in Egyptian securities. Concord is currently among the largest asset management firms in Egypt. One of the funds it manages, the Egypt Investment Company Ltd, has been repeatedly ranked by the International Herald Tribune as the top performing fund in the world. Prince Abbas Hilmi still works for Concord, where he holds the position of Senior Managing Director.

== Cultural activities ==
Since his return to Egypt in 1994, Prince Abbas Hilmi has devoted considerable time to the conservation of his family's architectural legacy. He was instrumental in providing the funds necessary for the 2004–2008 renovation of his great-grandfather Tewfik Pasha's mausoleum, where he has reserved a burial plot for himself. In 2006, he founded the Friends of Manial Palace Museum Association, which seeks to preserve the palace of his granduncle Prince Muhammad Ali.

== Marriage and children ==
In 1969, Prince Abbas Hilmi married Mediha Momtaz (born 1945). The religious ceremony was performed in Istanbul on 1 June, and the civil marriage took place at the Kensington Register Office in London on 20 June. Mediha is a maternal granddaughter of Ahmad Midhat Abbas Yeghen, a descendant of one of the sisters of Muhammad Ali Pasha, the founder of the Egyptian royal family. Prince Abbas Hilmi and his wife Mediha are thus genealogically related, as illustrated by the family tree below. The couple have a daughter, Sabiha Fatma (born 1974), and a son, Daoud Abdel Moneim (born 1979). As of 2005, Prince Abbas Hilmi's only sister Ikbal (born 1944) lived in Istanbul with their mother Neslişah (1921–2012) and her husband, married in 2000.
