= Embassy of Egypt, London =

Embassy of Egypt in London
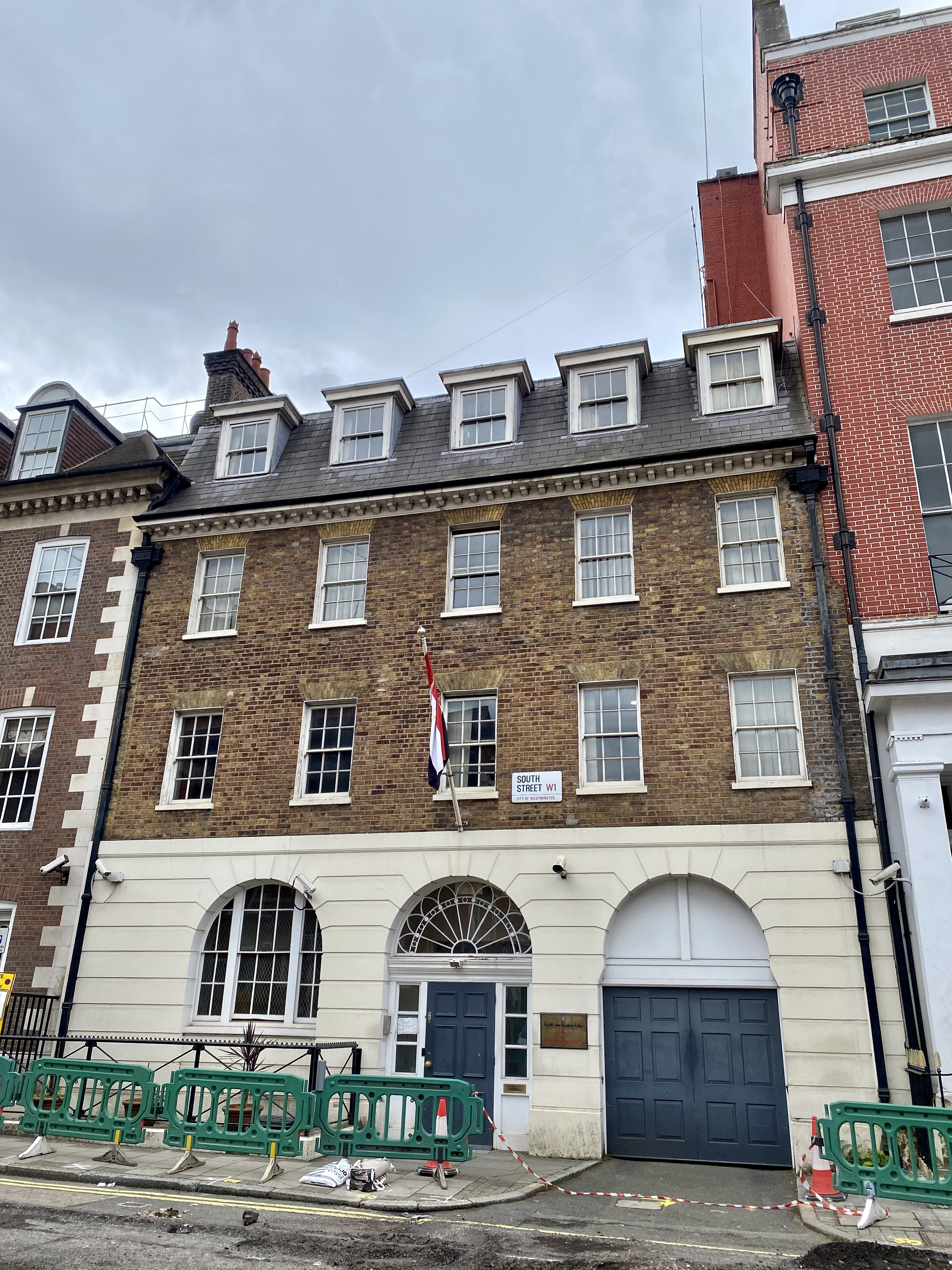
- Location: Mayfair, London
- Address: 26 South Street
- Coordinates: 51.5081°N 0.1520°W
- Ambassador: Ashraf Swelam

The Embassy of Egypt in London is the diplomatic mission of Egypt in the United Kingdom. It is located at 26 South Street, Mayfair, London.

Egypt also maintains several other buildings in London: a consulate general at 2 Lowndes Street, Belgravia, a press and information Office at 299 Oxford Street, a cultural office at 4 Chesterfield Gardens, Mayfair and a medical office at 47 Longridge Road, Earl's Court.

The current ambassador of Egypt to the United Kingdom is Ashraf Swelam.

== History ==
Diplomatic relations between Egypt and the United Kingdom date back to the nineteenth century, when Egypt (then nominally part of the Ottoman Empire) maintained a diplomatic presence in London under the rule of Muhammad Ali Pasha and his successors. Formal diplomatic representation expanded during the late nineteenth and early twentieth centuries, particularly following the British occupation of Egypt, which intensified political and administrative ties between the two countries.

In 1922, the United Kingdom unilaterally declared Egypt’s independence, leading to the establishment of full diplomatic relations and the elevation of Egypt’s representation in London to legation status. This was further upgraded to an embassy following Egypt’s transition to a republic after the Egyptian revolution of 1952, reflecting the development of modern bilateral diplomatic relations.

The embassy has been located in the Mayfair area of London for much of the twentieth and twenty-first centuries, reflecting the concentration of diplomatic missions in central London. In addition to the main embassy, Egypt maintains a consular presence at 2 Lowndes Street (Belgravia), providing visa and citizen services to Egyptian nationals and foreign applicants.

The Egyptian diplomatic presence in London also includes the Egyptian Cultural and Educational Bureau, located at 4 Chesterfield Gardens (Mayfair), which promotes cultural exchange, academic cooperation, and educational ties between Egypt and the United Kingdom.

The embassy has also played a role during key periods of political change in Egypt. During the Egyptian Revolution of 2011, the embassy in London became a focal point for demonstrations by members of the Egyptian diaspora and activists.

In the decades since, the embassy has continued to facilitate bilateral cooperation across trade, investment, education, and cultural exchange, reflecting the enduring relationship between Egypt and the United Kingdom.

=== Residence ===
The residence of the Egyptian ambassador is housed at Bute House (not to be confused with the government building of the same name), a Grade II listed building located at 75 South Audley Street and named after John Stuart, 3rd Earl of Bute. The building's first occupant was John Stuart, 1st Marquess of Bute, while its first Egyptian occupant was Aziz Ezzat Pasha, then Minister Plenipotentary, and Baheya Mansour Yegen, a granddaughter of Isma'il Pasha of Egypt and niece of Fuad I.

== List of representatives ==
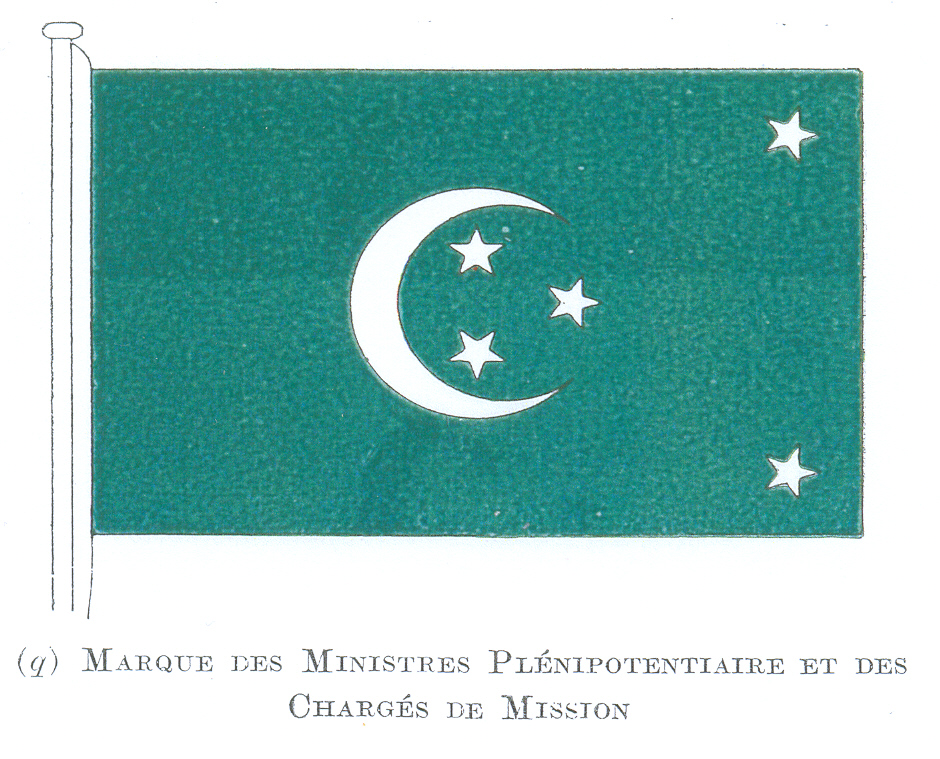
Flag of Egyptian ministers plenipotentiary during the monarchy

Below is a list of diplomatic representatives from Egypt to the United Kingdom.

#	Ambassador		Title	Date of appointment
1	Aziz Pasha Ezzat	عزيز باشا عزت	Minister Plenipotentiary	14/1/1924
2	Sezostories Bek Siedaros	سيزوستوريس بك سيداروس	Minister Plenipotentiary	1927
3	Abd El Malek Bek Hamza	عبد الملك بك حمزة	Chargé d'Affaires	4/10/1928
4	Hassan Sabry Pasha	حسن صبرى	Minister Plenipotentiary	19/2/1935oo
5	Hafez Afifi Pasha	د.حافظ باشا عفيفى	Minister Plenipotentiary	11/3/1937
6	Abd Elrahman Bek Hakey	عبد الرحمن بك حقى	Charge d'Affaires	1937
7	Hassan Pasha Nashat	د.حسن باشا نشأت	Ambassador	24/6/1938
8	F. D. Amr Bey	عبدالفتاح باشا عمرو	Ambassador	24/7/1945
9	Mahmoud Fawzi	د.محمود فوزى	Ambassador	30/10/1952
10	Abd Elrahman Hakky	عبد الرحمن حقى	Ambassador	18/3/1953
11	Samy Abu Elfetouh	سامى ابو الفتوح	Ambassador	18/10/1955
12	Kamal Khalil	كمال خليل	Chargé d'Affaires	1959
13	Mohamed Awad Elquni	محمد عوض القونى	Ambassador	24/3/1961
14	Mohammed Hafez Ismail	محمد حافظ إسماعيل	Ambassador	23/6/1964
15	Ahmed Hassan Elfiky	أحمد حسن الفقى	Ambassador	20/12/1967
16	Kamal Rifaat	كمال الدين رفعت	Ambassador	12/10/1971
17	Saad el-Shazly	سعد محمد الشاذلى	Ambassador	16/5/1974
18	Mohamed Samieh Anwar	محمد سميح أنور	Ambassador	31/10/1975
19	Hassan Abu Seeda	حسن أبوسعده	Ambassador	27/2/1980
20	Youssef Abd Elaziz Shrarah	يوسف عبدالعزيز شراره	Ambassador	29/11/1984
21	Dr. Mohamed Shaker	د.محمد إبراهيم شاكر	Ambassador	14/9/1988
22	Adel Salah Eldin Elgazar	عادل صلاح الدين الجزار	Ambassador	15/9/1997
23	Gehad Refaat Madi	حهاد رفعت ماضي	Ambassador	1/8/2004
24	Hatem Seif El Nasr	حاتم سيف النصر	Ambassador	1/12/2008
25	Mohamed Ashraf Mohamed Kamal El Kholy	اشرف الخولى	Ambassador	5/15/2013
26	Nasser Kamel	ناصر كامل	Ambassador	5/15/2015
27	Tarek Adel	طارق عادل	Ambassador	
27	Sherif Kamel	شريف كامل	Ambassador	3/22/2022
28	Ashraf Swelam	أشرف سويلم	Ambassador	9/4/2025

== Gallery ==
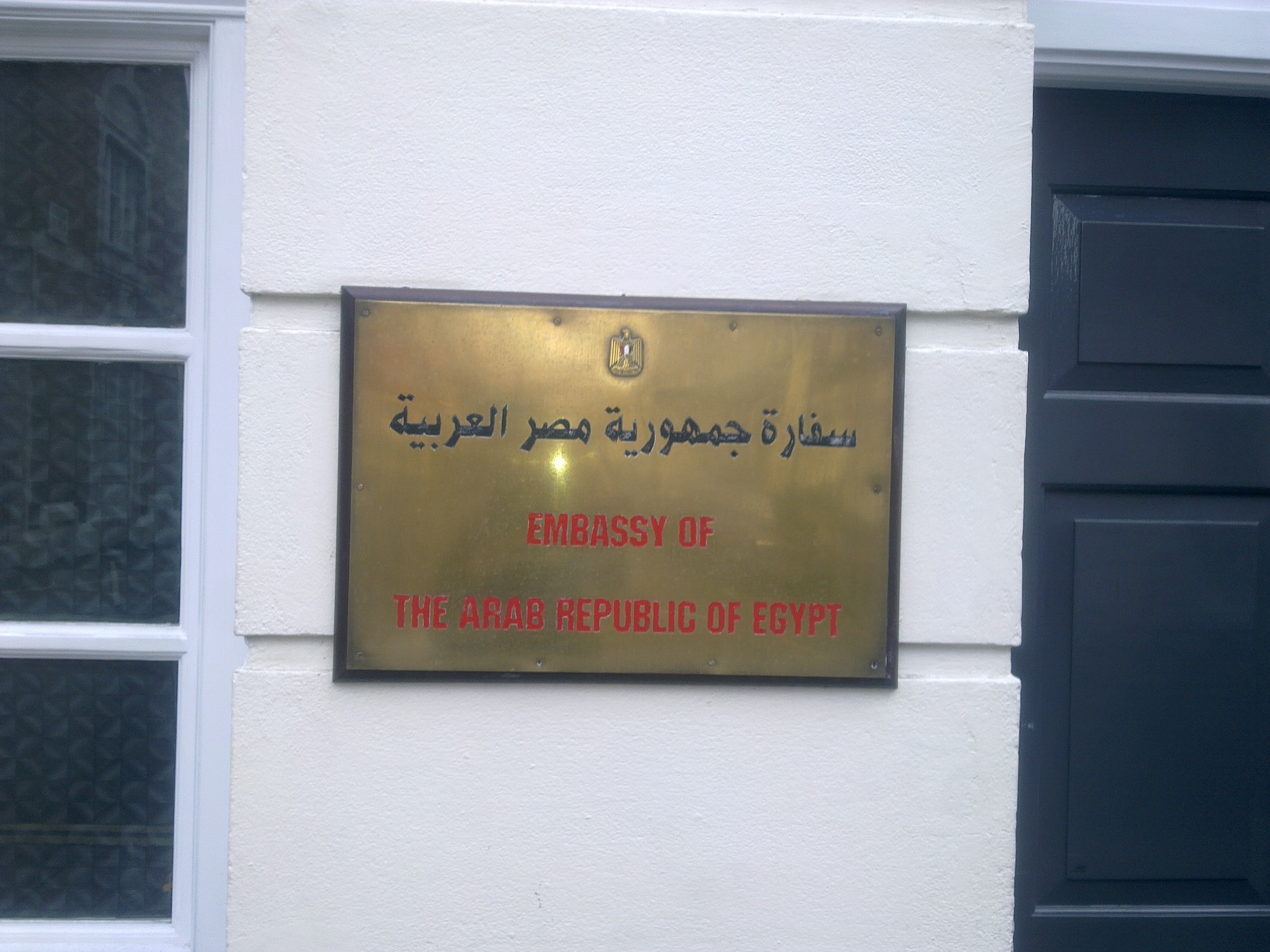
Bilingual plaque outside the embassy depicting the coat of arms

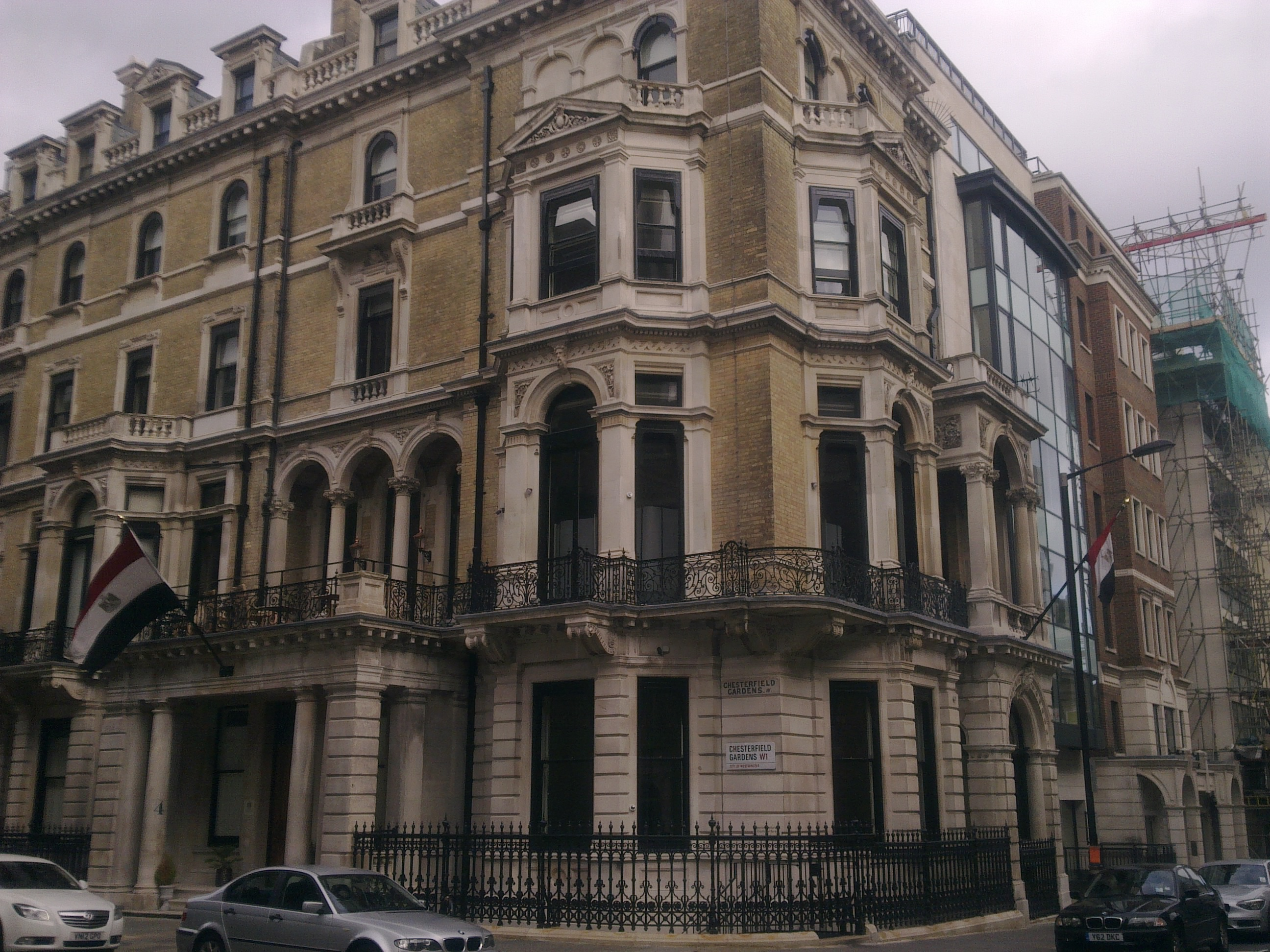
Cultural office at 4 Chesterfield Gardens

== See also ==
- Egypt–United Kingdom relations
- List of diplomats from the United Kingdom to Egypt
