= Rashad Mehanna =

Egyptian colonel (1909–1996)

- Mehanna (right) with Prince Muhammad Abdel Moneim (left) and Barakat Pasha (middle)

Minister of Transport
- In office 30 July 1952 – 2 August 1952
- Prime Minister: Ali Mahir Pasha
- Preceded by: Mohamed Zoheir Garranah Bey
- Succeeded by: Mohamed Zoheir Garranah Bey

Regent of Egypt
- In office 2 August 1952 – 14 October 1952
- Monarch: Fuad II

Personal details
- Born: 2 October 1909 Kom Hamada, Egypt
- Died: 3 January 1996 (aged 86)
- Education: Egyptian Military Academy
- Profession: Officer

Military service
- Branch/service: Artillery of the Egyptian Army
- Rank: Colonel

Rashad Mehanna (Arabic: رشاد مهنا; 2 October 1909 – 3 January 1996)^{[Note A]} was an Egyptian colonel who played a significant role in the Egyptian Revolution of 1952.

== Early life ==
Mehanna was born to an Azharite father in the markaze of Kom Hamada in the Beheira Governorate. As a child, he studied at a Quranic school, then went to primary school in Tanta and obtained his high school diploma in 1928. He initially went to medical school, but dropped out and joined the Egyptian Military Academy. He graduated in 1932 and joined the artillery branch of the Egyptian Army.

Mehanna travelled to the United Kingdom in 1937 on a military scholarship, then returned a year later in order to work as a teacher at the Artillery School. He was the first Egyptian officer to specialize in air defense. Where in 1938 he formed the Anti-Aircraft branch of the artillery.

Between 1946 and 1947, Mehanna helped Mohammad Amin al-Husayni who had proclaimed jihad in Palestine. Along with other officers, he provided him with arms in order to support the Palestinian resistance. Mehanna was arrested in 1947 with a group of other officers on charges of conspiracy against King Farouk I. However, he was released after a short while.

== Role in the 1952 Revolution ==
Mehanna was contacted by Gamal Abdel Nasser in 1949 and attended preparatory meetings for the Revolution. During the 1951 elections at the Officers' Club, Mehanna was the one who advocated Muhammad Naguib's election.

After the Revolution took place in July 1952, Mehanna was appointed Minister of Transport in the first post-revolutionary government, which was headed by Ali Maher. He was one of the few members of the Free Officers Committee whose name was actually known, the nine-person committee being shrouded in secrecy and most of its members keeping their names almost a military secret. Mehanna acted as an intermediary between the Free Officers Committee and the Cabinet, since he was a member of both.

== Regency and arrest ==
Mehanna was chosen by Nasser to serve as a representative of the Army on the three-member Regency Body established during the nominal reign of infant king-in-exile Fuad II. However, the Regency Body had no real powers, these having been assumed by the Revolutionary Command Council (RCC). Historians of this period agree that one of the main reasons for the hostility that arose between Mehanna and the RCC was that the former actually took his title seriously while Nasser and his colleagues had no intention whatsoever of allowing him to exercise the powers that came with it. The standoff ended with the dismissal of Mehanna as a member of the Regency Body. The Body was dissolved altogether, and Prince Muhammad Abdel Moneim was appointed as sole Prince regent.

By early 1953, reports began circulating which indicated that Mehanna was the ringleader in an attempted coup. As a result of this, Mehanna was accused of counterrevolutionary conspiracy and was sentenced to life imprisonment on 30 March 1953. However, he was released in 1956 and then put under house arrest. He was re-arrested in 1965, only to be released once again in 1967. He retired completely from politics after that, and died on 3 January 1996.

== Notes ==
A: Joan Wucher King's Historical Dictionary of Egypt gives 1918 as Mehanna's year of birth and 1982 as his year of death. However, Arabic Wikipedia gives 2 October 1909 as his date of birth and 3 January 1996 as his date of death. It cites an obituary by Mostafa Amin published on 10 January 1996. In his memoirs, Muhammad Naguib states that Mehanna was 39 years old at the time of the 1947 abortive conspiracy, which is concordant with the 1909 birth date.

== Bibliography ==
- King, Joan Wucher (1989) [First published 1984]. Historical Dictionary of Egypt. Books of Lasting Value. American University in Cairo Press. ISBN 978-977-424-213-7.
- Naguib, Muhammad (1955). Egypt's Destiny. London: Gollancz. OCLC 2326907.

Political offices
Preceded by Cabinet of Egypt assuming the powers of infant King Fuad II	Regent of Egypt; 1952 with Prince Muhammad Abdel Moneim; Bahey El Din Barakat Pasha	Succeeded by Prince Muhammad Abdel Moneim as sole Prince regent
