= Hafez Afifi Pasha =

Egyptian politician (1886–1961)

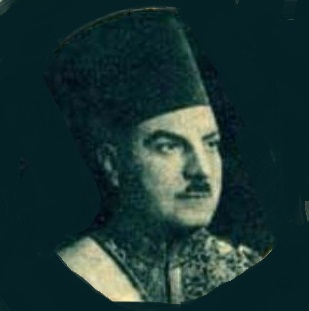
Afifi Pasha

Hafez Afifi Pasha (1885/1886 – 1961) was an Egyptian diplomat. He was the Ambassador of Egypt to the United Kingdom, represented the nation on the United Nations Security Council and was head of Farouk of Egypt's royal cabinet.

== Biography ==
Afifi Pasha was born in 1885 or 1886. There is another report stating that he was born in Cairo in 1886. He was a physician before entering diplomacy. According to a profile by Dorothy Thompson, he became "one of the most famous specialists in the Arab world."

Afifi Pasha was the minister of foreign minister between June 1928 and October 1929 in the cabined of Mohamed Mahmoud Pasha. Later he served as the Misr Bank's president and Ambassador of Egypt to the United Kingdom. He held the presidency of the United Nations Security Council from 17 April to 16 May 1946. In December 1951 he was appointed to be the chief of Farouk of Egypt's royal cabinet. The move sparked rumors that Mostafa El-Nahas's government had resigned. These were denied. In the early days of holding the post he advocated increasing Egyptian ties to western nations such as Britain and the United States. The appointment was met with at least three protests across Egypt.

Afifi Pasha also worked to develop industry in Egypt, notably the cotton industry in El Mahalla El Kubra. He also supported the artist Mahmoud Mokhtar. He died in 1961.

Afifi Pasha was the recipient of the Grand Cordon of the Order of Ismail. In 2015 it was reported that his villa in Alexandria was set for demolition.
