= Catherine Walters =

English courtesan

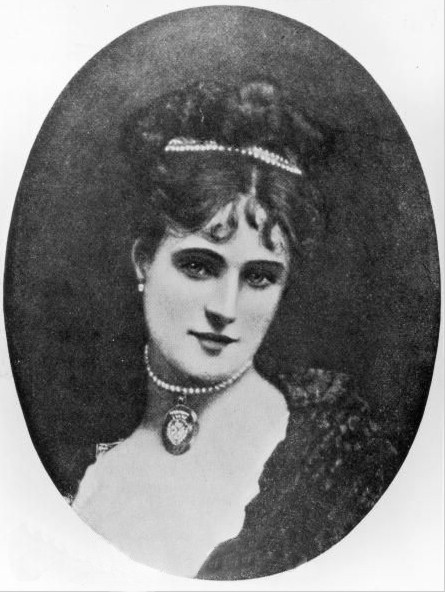
- Portrait of Catherine Walters
- Born: 13 June 1839; Toxteth, Liverpool, England
- Died: 5 August 1920 (aged 81); South Street, Mayfair, London, England
- Resting place: Franciscan Monastery Crawley, West Sussex, England; 51.1133°N 0.1878°W
- Other name: Skittles
- Occupation: Courtesan

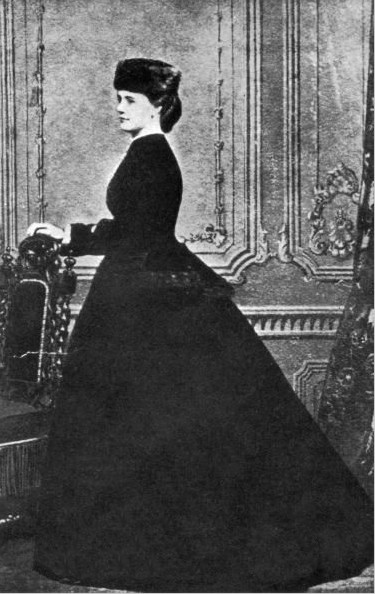
A photograph of Catherine Walters

Catherine Walters (13 June 1839 – 5 August 1920), also known as "Skittles", was a British fashion trendsetter and one of the last of the great courtesans of Victorian London. Walters was an established equestrian contributing to the rise of fashion trends in horsewomen. Walters' benefactors are rumoured to have included intellectuals, leaders of political parties, aristocrats and Edward, Prince of Wales.

== Early life ==
Catherine Walters was born on 13 June 1839, the third of five children at 1 Henderson Street, Toxteth, Liverpool, grew up in the Liverpool area and moved to London before her twentieth birthday. Her father was Edward Walters, a customs official, who died in 1864. Her mother was Mary Ann Fowler.

Her nickname is thought to have originated from her working at a bowling alley in Chesterfield Street near Park Lane. (Skittles is the game which evolved into bowling.) At other times, she was known as "Mrs. Behrens" and "Mrs. Baillie", even though she is not thought to have married.

While not a classical beauty, she was generally considered pretty in her youth, although journalist Nathaniel Gubbins thought she had an "exceedingly plain face". What was undisputed was her "perfect figure" and her skill as a horsewoman, for which she was almost equally renowned.

== Rise to fame ==
Walters came from humble beginnings, but broke into high-society with her skills as an equestrian. She was a part of the "pretty horsebreakers", a group of courtesans made famous by their remarkable horsemanship. Walters' skills in the saddle allowed her to mix easily with high society.

Walters became the mistress of Spencer Cavendish, Marquess of Hartington (later eighth Duke of Devonshire), who set her up in a Mayfair house with an annuity. In the 1860s, the sight of Walters riding on Rotten Row in Hyde Park drew sightseers. Aristocratic ladies copied the cut of her perfectly fitting "Princess" riding habit, and she was well known as a trendsetter. Walter's riding attire was principally ordered from Henry Poole & Co and featured silk linings, velvet collars, and braided cuffs. Her beauty, ideal figure, and riding skill meant that she was mentioned frequently in the press.

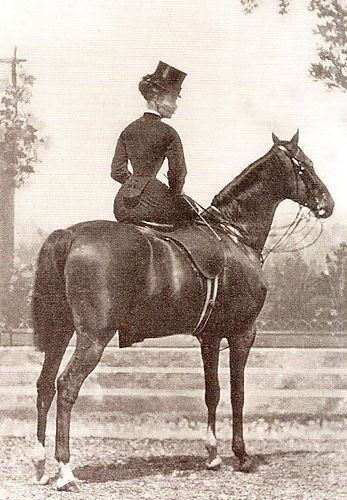
Catherine Walters on horseback

A letter written to The Times in July 1862 described in detail the fever of anticipation among the waiting admirers of a thinly disguised Walters:

"Expectation is raised to its highest pitch: a handsome woman drives rapidly by in a carriage drawn by thoroughbred ponies of surpassing shape and action; the driver is attired in the pork pie hat and the Poole paletot introduced by Anonyma; but alas!, she caused no effect at all, for she is not Anonyma; she is only the Duchess of A–, the Marchioness of B–, the Countess of C–, or some other of Anonyma's many imitators. The crowd, disappointed, reseat themselves, and wait. Another pony carriage succeeds – and another – with the same depressing result. At last their patience is rewarded. Anonyma and her ponies appear, and they are satisfied. She threads her way dexterously, with an unconscious air, through the throng, commented upon by the hundreds who admire and the hundreds who envy her. She pulls up her ponies to speak to an acquaintance, and her carriage is instantly surrounded by a multitude; she turns and drives back again towards Apsley House, and then away into the unknown world, nobody knows whither".

== Travels and later life ==
In 1862, at the height of her fame, she left London, selling her house and auctioning its contents, and traveled to New York with a rich married man, Aubrey de Vere Beauclerk of Ardglass Castle, County Down, with whom she spent some months.

Walters then went to Paris, where under the patronage of Achille Fould, Finance Minister to Napoléon III, she took her place amongst the leaders of the demimonde, and established a salon. It was here she met the poet Wilfrid Scawen Blunt, who remained infatuated with her for the rest of his life.

She spent ten years in Europe, returning regularly to Leicestershire for the hunting season, furthering her reputation as a great horsewoman. In 1872, Walters returned to London, and as in Paris, established a salon. Her callers included the Prince of Wales (later King Edward VII). She also met the Hon. Gerald Le Marchant de Saumarez, an artist 20 years her junior, with whom she established a relationship which lasted until her death.

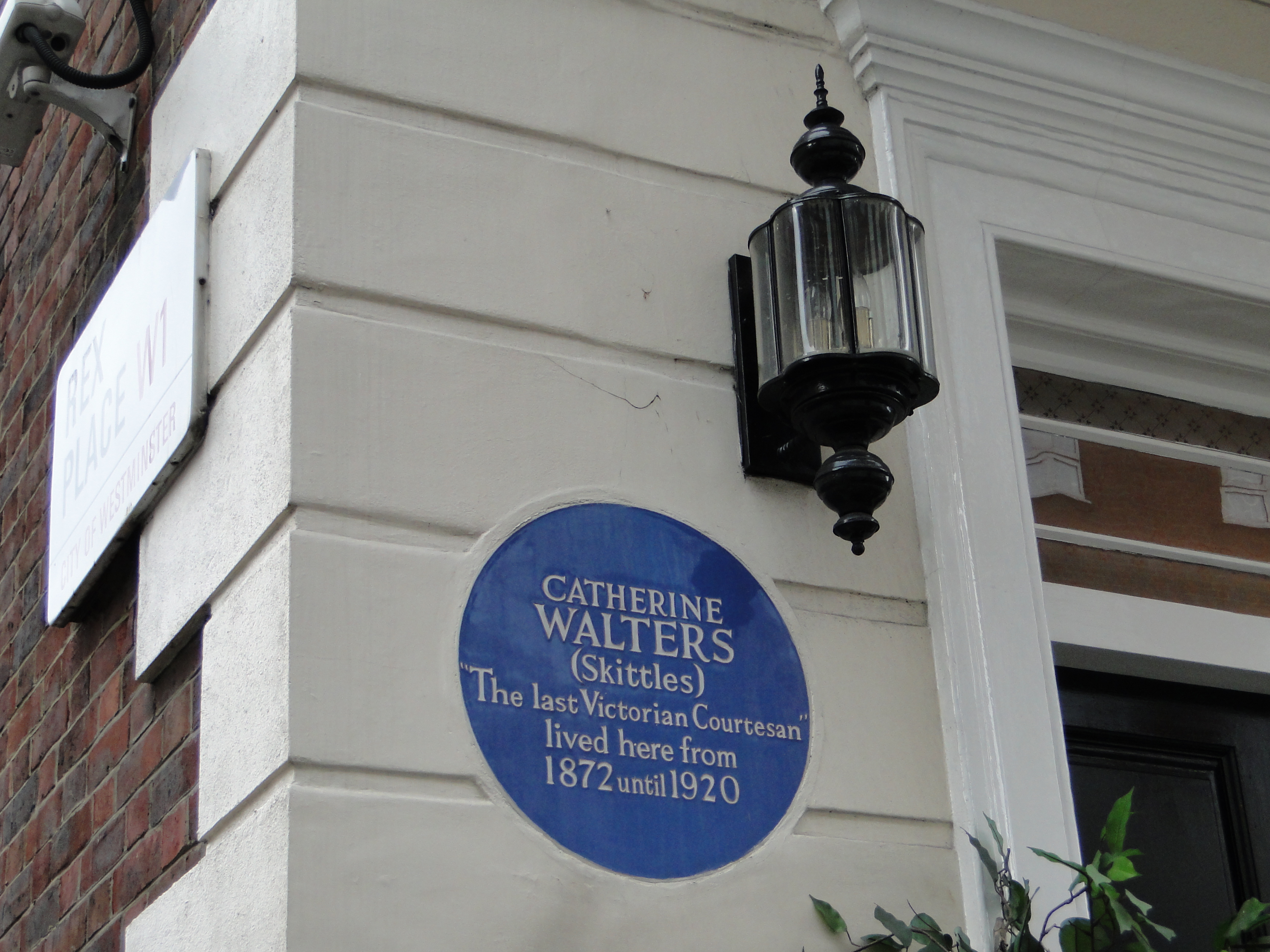
Blue plaque for Walters at 15 South Street, Mayfair

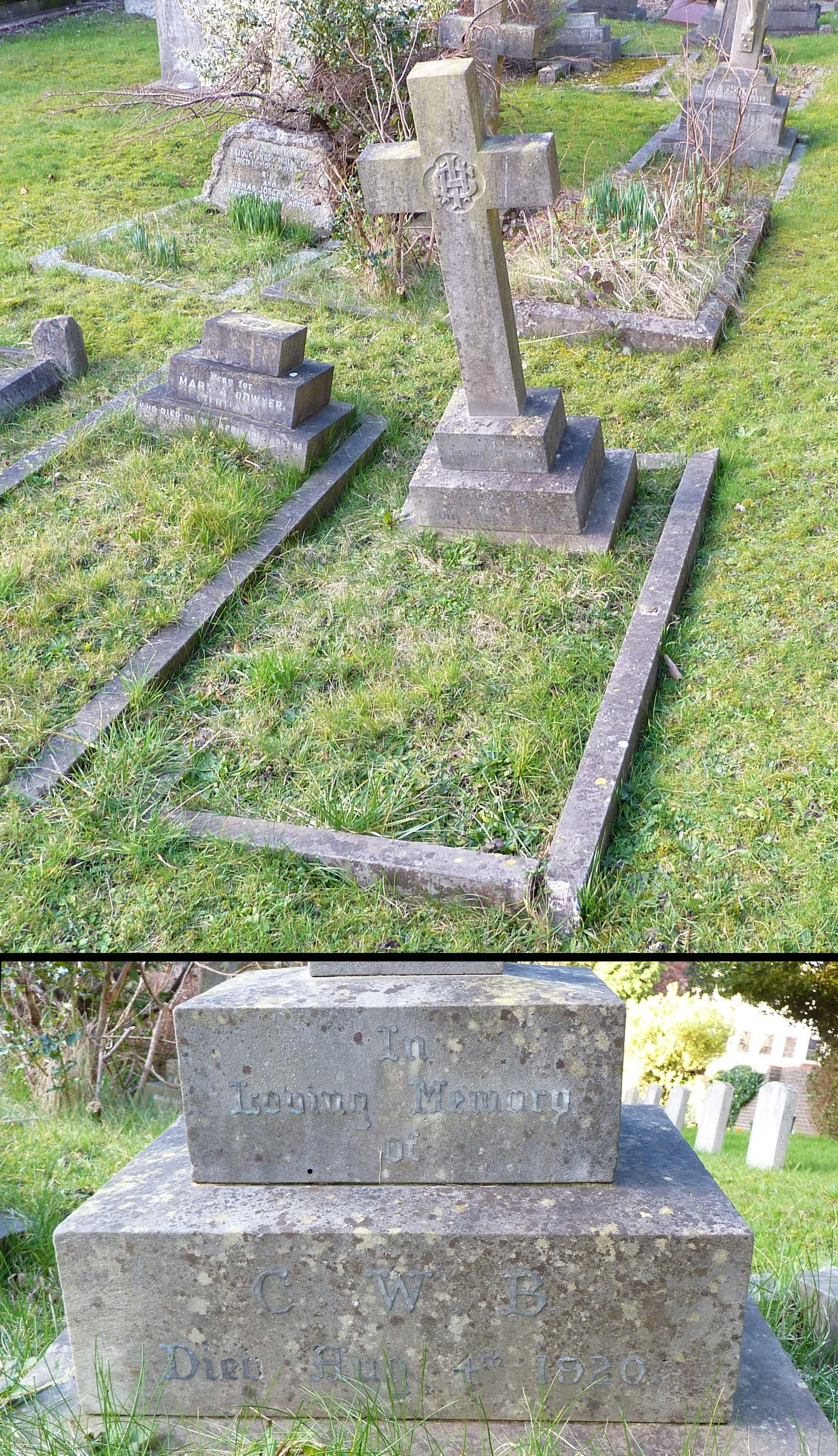
Walters' gravestone bearing the initials C.W.B and the date of death 4 August 1920 is at the Friary Church of St Francis and St Anthony, Crawley, West Sussex.

Walters' discretion and loyalty made her a sought-after companion and enabled her to retire a wealthy woman around 1890. Her estate was worth a very considerable £2,764 19s. 6d at her death. She died of a cerebral haemorrhage on 5 August 1920 at her home at 15 South Street, Mayfair (now graced by a blue plaque,) and was buried in the graveyard of the Franciscan Monastery in Crawley, West Sussex.

== Cultural references ==
In 1864, a London publisher, George Vickers, brought out three fictionalised biographies: Anonyma: or, Fair but Frail; Skittles: the Biography of a Fascinating Woman; and Skittles in Paris. The author was possibly William Stephens Hayward, or Bracebridge Hemyng. The open sale (and commercial success) of the biographies caused expressions of moral concern in contemporary newspapers and magazines.

In 1861, Alfred Austin, a future poet laureate, referred to 'Skittles' by name in The Season: a Satire, his poem satirising mid-Victorian social mores. He described her dramatic appearance in Rotten Row, and the covert and jealous interest society ladies felt for her. He also suggested that Skittles and other celebrity courtesans were attractive not merely because they offered sex, but because they were more natural, less repressed and less boring than the well-bred girls who came to London for the marriage 'season'.

Wilfrid Scawen Blunt's poetic sequence The Love Sonnets of Proteus and his later work Esther are thought to be based on his early affair and later friendship with Walters.

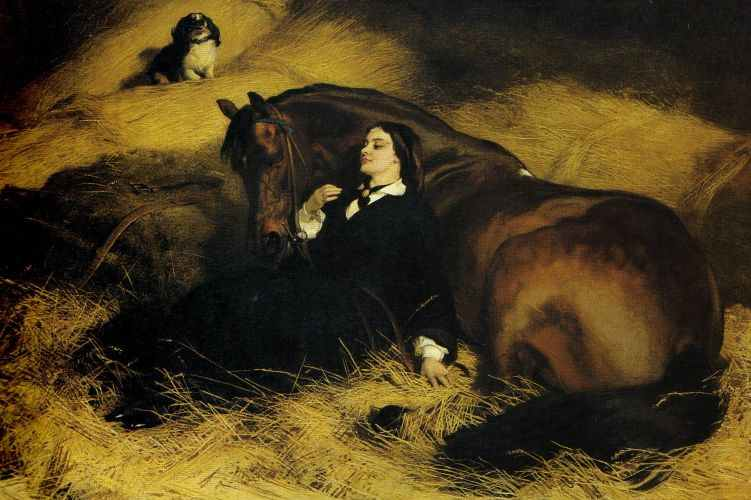
Landseer's The Shrew Tamed (1861)

The painter Edwin Landseer submitted a picture called The Shrew Tamed for the Royal Academy exhibition of 1861. It showed a beautiful girl in riding habit reclining against the neck of a horse which is on its knees among the straw. It was ostensibly not a portrait of Walters, but the alleged model, the noted horsewoman (and mistress of the Duke of Sutherland (Note: The Sutherland family were frequent patrons of Landseer and Gilbert is mentioned several times in the artist's diaries and letters.)) Annie Gilbert, resembles her, and the juxtaposition of horse, beautiful woman and prevailing mood of languor troubled contemporary critics; some clearly assumed Walters herself had been the subject. The picture gained the alternative title of The Pretty Horsebreaker.

In 1887, Elizabeth Blackwell's "Purchase of Women: the Great Economic Blunder" named "Skittles" as an example of the immoral influence of older sex workers, writing "our generation has witnessed the enslaving power of these tyrants of lust. They have dried up the generous enthusiasm of our youth, and destroyed those principles of trust, freedom, and sympathy which should guide our domestic and foreign policy."

The artist George Finch Mason provided the photograph of her taken in Paris in her mid-twenties that appears in the book Annals of the Billesdon Hunt.
