= Bahey El Din Barakat Pasha =

Egyptian political figure

Bahey El Din Barakat Pasha

Bahey El Din Barakat Pasha (Arabic: بهي الدين بركات باشا) (1889–1972) was an Egyptian political figure.

Born in Menyat El Morshed village (in Kafr el-Sheikh Governorate), he studied in Cairo as well as in Paris. Originally a law teacher, he entered politics and was appointed Minister of Education twice during the 1930s. During his tenure, a committee was established to facilitate Arabic grammar rules in order to make it easier for students to study in Arabic. He paid attention to the improvement of textbooks, and created an admission system for the High Institute of Education in 1938. In January of the same year, he inaugurated Egypt's radio broadcasting service.

A leading figure of the Wafd Party during Saad Zaghlul's leadership as well as during the reign of King Farouk I, Bahey El Din Barakat was elected Speaker of the Chamber of Deputies on 12 April 1938, a position he held for a year and a half.

Barakat received the nobiliary title of Pasha on 15 February 1938. He headed the Divan of Accounting from 1945 to 1949. He also served on the three-member Regency Body that was formed following the 1952 Revolution to assume the powers of King Fuad II, who was barely six months old at the time. The Regency Body had no actual powers, however, these having been effectively assumed by the Revolutionary Command Council. Created on 2 August 1952, the Regency Body was dissolved on 14 October of the same year, with Prince Muhammad Abdel Moneim being appointed as sole regent.

Political offices
Preceded by Hafez Hassan Pasha	Minister of Education; 1 January 1930 – 19 June 1930	Succeeded by Mourad Sayyed Ahmad Pasha
Preceded by Abdel Salam Fahmi Gomaa Pasha	Minister of Education; 30 December 1937 – 26 April 1938	Succeeded by Muhammad Husayn Haykal
Preceded by Cabinet of Egypt assuming the powers of infant King Fuad II	Regent of Egypt; 2 August 1952 – 14 October 1952 with Prince Muhammad Abdel Moneim; Rashad Mehanna	Succeeded by Prince Muhammad Abdel Moneim as sole Prince regent
Government offices
Preceded by Kamel Sidqi Pasha	Chairman of the Divan of Accounting; 17 April 1945 – 20 September 1949	Succeeded by Mahmoud Muhammad Mahmoud
Parliament of Egypt
Preceded by Mahmoud Basyouni	Speaker of the Chamber of Deputies; 12 April 1938 – 17 November 1939	Succeeded by Abdel Salam Fahmi Gomaa Pasha
