= South Street, Mayfair =

Street in Mayfair, London

Coordinates: 51.50820°N 0.15247°W

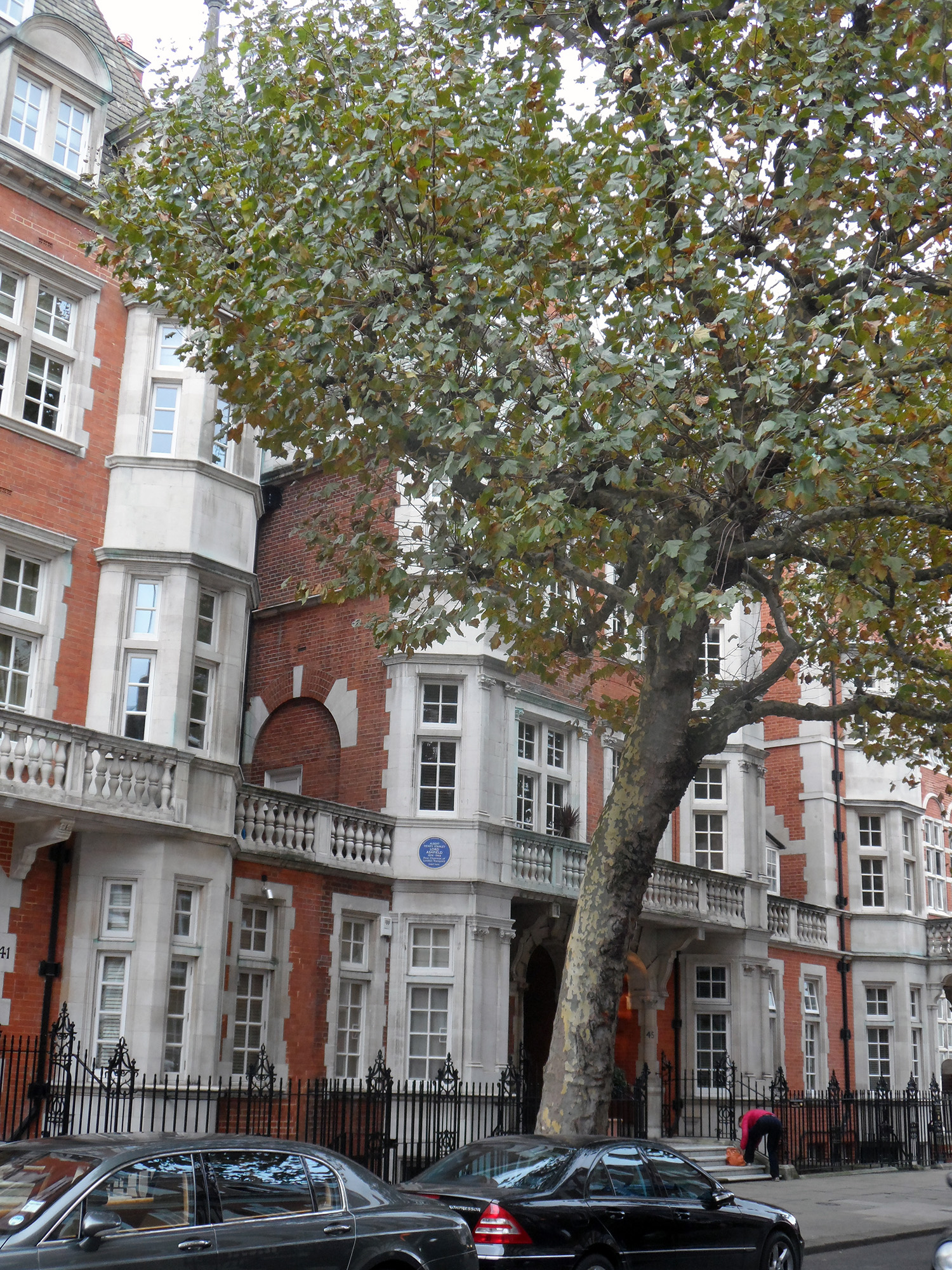
Ashfield, 43 South Street, Mayfair

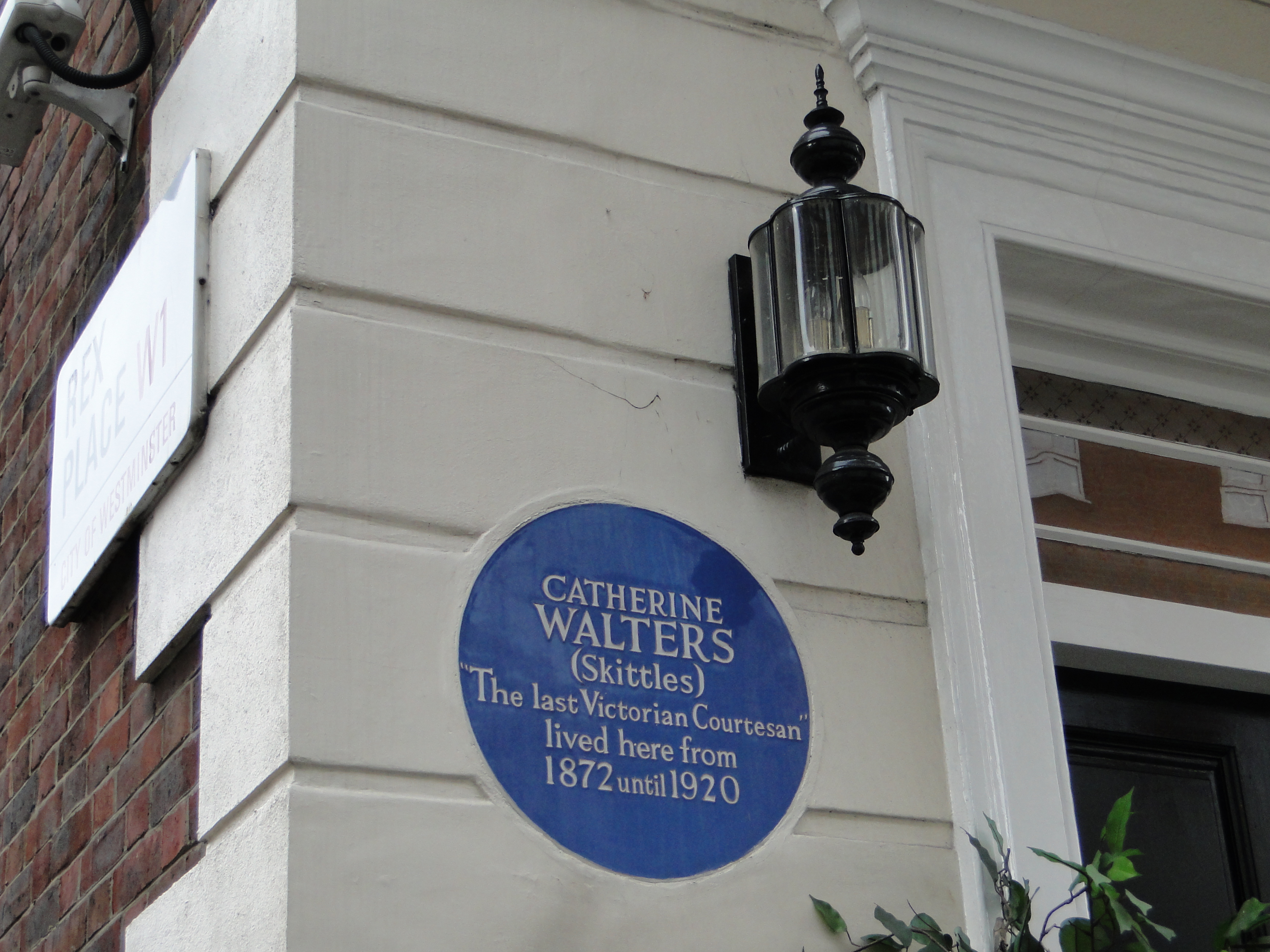
Blue plaque to Catherine Walters, "Skittles", in South Street

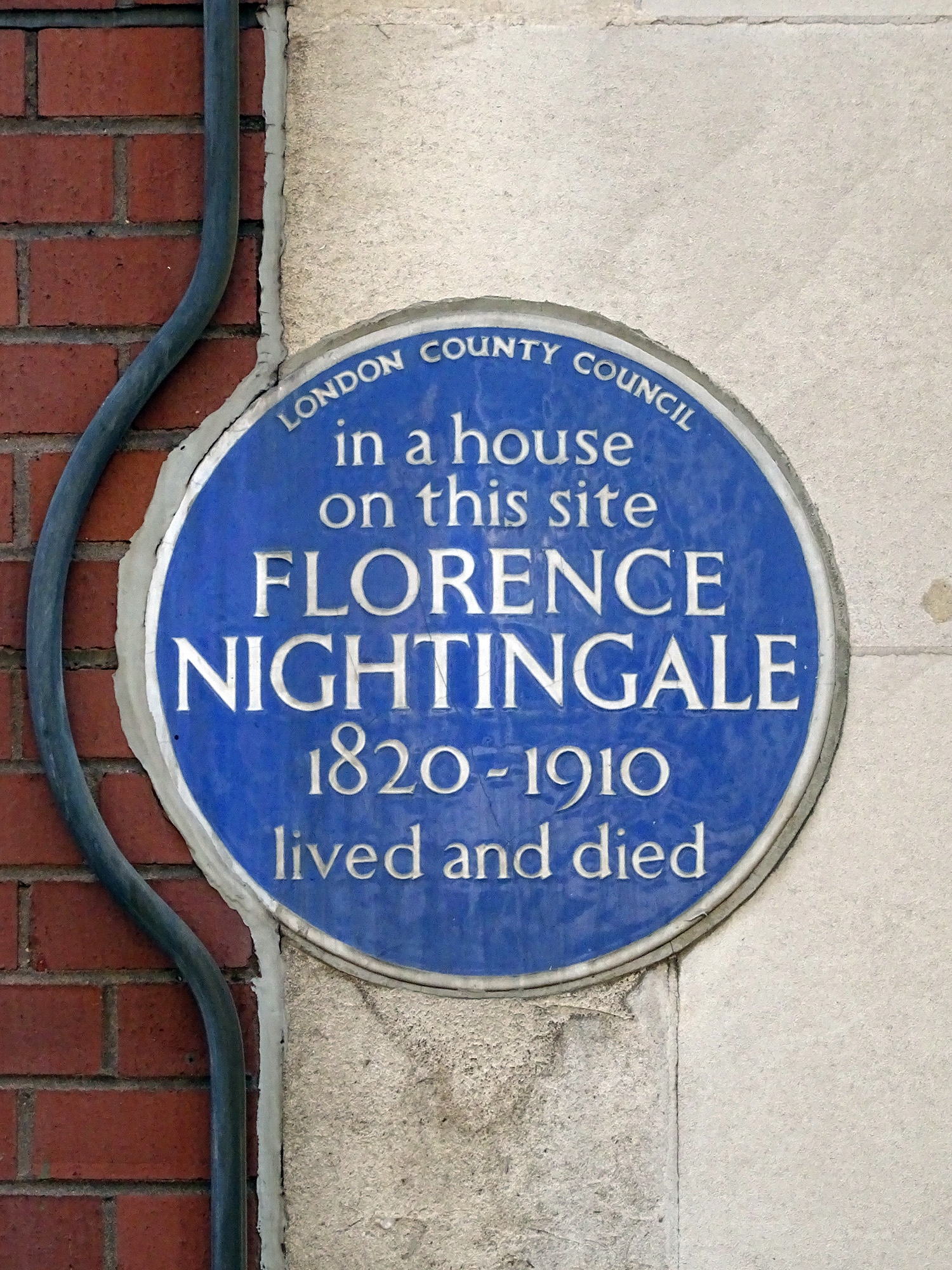
Florence Nightingale lived and died at 10 South Street

South Street is a street in Mayfair, London, England. It runs west to east from Park Lane before merging into Farm Street.

Notable buildings include the private house, Aberconway House, listed for sale in 2007 by the developer and estate agent Portman Heritage at £46 million.

58-59 South Street is a mid 18th-century building that was remodelled in about 1936 by Sir Edwin Lutyens. It is a Grade II Listed Building.

Historical residents include the courtesan Catherine Walters who lived there from 1872 until her death in 1920, and the future British Prime Minister Sir Alec Douglas-Home, born in 1903, whose childhood London home was at 28 South Street, a house built in 1902 with eighteen front windows, which his family leased from the politician and stockbroker, Sir Cuthbert Quilter. John Pierpont Morgan lived at 2 South Street in 1901. He was an American financier and banker who dominated corporate finance on Wall Street throughout the Gilded Age. As the head of the banking firm that ultimately became known as J.P. Morgan and Co., he was the driving force behind the wave of industrial consolidation in the United States spanning the late 19th and early 20th centuries. It became the London home of the novelist and socialite, Barbara Cartland, from the 1930s until 1950.
