= Regencies in Egypt =

Regencies in Egypt date back to Pharaonic times. Throughout Egypt's long history, there have been several instances of regents assuming power due to the reigning monarch's minority, physical illness or poor mental health. There have also been several cases of coregencies where two monarchs ruled simultaneously.

== Ancient Egypt ==
Female Regents

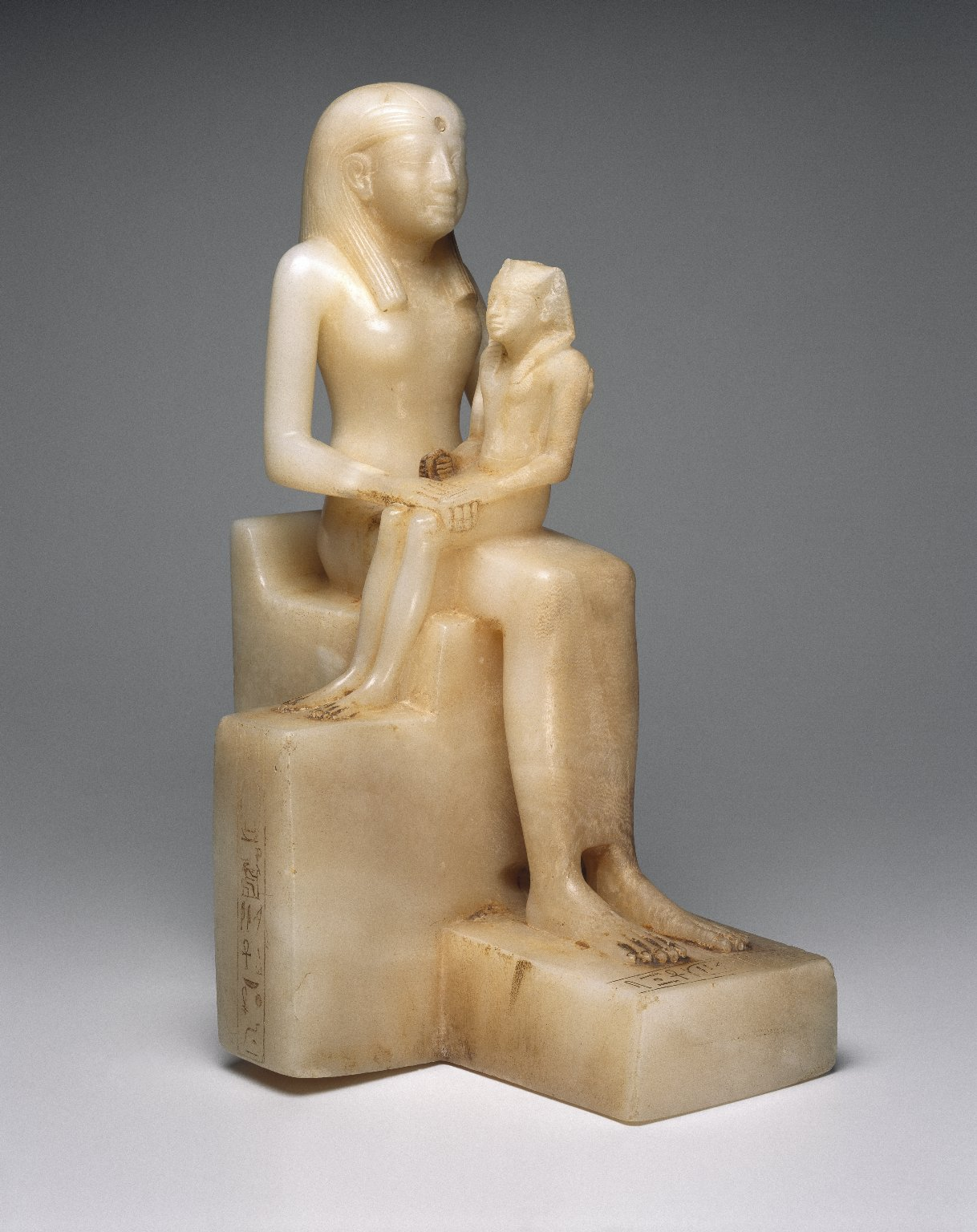
Statuette of Ankhesenpepi II with her son Pepi II.

Regencies were very frequent during the Pharaonic era, particularly in cases where the new king was too young to rule. In such instances, it was usually the young king's mother (or sometimes step-mother) who would act as regent until the king was old enough to rule by himself. The most famous Ancient Egyptian regent is probably Hatshepsut, who initially served as regent for her young nephew Thutmose III before taking the throne herself and reigning for more than twenty years.

1. Neithotep ruled as regent on behalf of either her son Hor-Aha or grandson Djer (c. 3050 BC)
2. Merneith ruled on behalf of her son Den (c. 2970 BC)
3. Nimaathap possibly ruled on behalf of her son Djoser (c. 2670 BC)
4. Khentkaus I likely ruled as a regent, but her son or sons are unknown.
5. Khentkaus II possibly ruled as a regent for one of her sons (Neferefre or Nyuserre Ini).
6. Iput I possibly ruled as a regent for her son Pepi I (c. 2332 BC)
7. Ankhesenpepi II ruled as a regent for her son Pepi II (c. 2278 BC)
8. Ahhotep I ruled as a regent for her son Ahmose I (c. 1550 BC)
9. Ahmose-Nefertari ruled as a regent for her son Amenhotep I (c. 1541 BC)
10. Hatshepsut initially ruled as a regent for her step-son Thutmose III (c. 1479 BC) before becoming Pharaoh in her own right and co-ruling Egypt alongside Thutmose III.
11. Mutemwiya ruled as a regent for her son Amenhotep III (c. 1388)
12. Twosret ruled as a regent for her step-son Siptah (c. 1197 BC) and later became Pharaoh in her own right after his death.

Male Regents

While less common, male regents are known to have taken power during the Pharaonic era.

1. Horemheb – Regent during the reign of Tutankhamun.
2. Tjahapimu – Regent of Egypt while Teos was on a military expedition against the Achaemenid Empire

Co-rule

Coregencies were also very common, and aging monarchs often appointed their sons and heirs as coregents towards the end of their reigns. Most Pharaohs of the Twelfth Dynasty until Amenemhat III had a period of co-rule with their eventual successors.

== Ptolemaic Egypt ==
The Ptolemaic Dynasty implemented a policy of co-rule starting with Ptolemy II and Arsinoe II. It was common during this dynasty to have husband-wife and sibling pairings ruling over Egypt. Co-rule could also happen between unmarried siblings or parents and children. In at least one case, Egypt had three reigning Pharaohs at the same time with Ptolemy VI, Cleopatra II and Ptolemy VIII.

Timeline of Rulers of the Ptolemaic Dynasty (All dates BC)

Dates	Rulers
305-284	Ptolemy I (Sole Rule)
284-282	Ptolemy I and Ptolemy II
282-277	Ptolemy II (Sole Rule)
277-270	Ptolemy II and Arsinoe II
270-246	Ptolemy II (Sole Rule)
246-222	Ptolemy III and Berenice II
222-220	Ptolemy IV (Sole Rule)
220-204	Ptolemy IV and Arsinoe III
204-202	Ptolemy V – under regency of Agathocles
202-201	Ptolemy V – under regency of Tlepolemus
201-196	Ptolemy V – under regency of Aristomenes
196-193	Ptolemy V (Sole Rule)
193-180	Ptolemy V and Cleopatra I
180-176	Cleopatra I and Ptolemy VI
176-175	Ptolemy VI – under regency of Eulaeus and Lenaeus
175-170	Ptolemy VI and Cleopatra II
170-164	Ptolemy VI, Cleopatra II and Ptolemy VIII
164-163	Ptolemy VIII (Sole Rule)
163-145	Ptolemy VI and Cleopatra II
145	Ptolemy VI, Cleopatra II and Ptolemy VII
145-144	Cleopatra II and Ptolemy VII
144-140	Cleopatra II and Ptolemy VIII
140-131	Cleopatra II, Ptolemy VIII and Cleopatra III
131-127	Cleopatra II (Sole Rule)
127-124	Ptolemy VIII and Cleopatra III
124-116	Cleopatra II, Ptolemy VIII and Cleopatra III
116	Cleopatra II, Cleopatra III and Ptolemy IX
116-115	Cleopatra III, Ptolemy IX and Cleopatra IV
115-107	Cleopatra III and Ptolemy IX
107-101	Cleopatra III and Ptolemy X
101-88	Ptolemy X and Berenice III
88-81	Ptolemy IX (Sole Reign)
81	Ptolemy IX and Berenice III
81-80	Berenice III (Sole Reign)
80	Berenice III and Ptolemy XI
80	Ptolemy XI (Sole Reign)
80-79	Ptolemy XII (Sole Reign)
79-69	Ptolemy XII and Cleopatra V
69-58	Ptolemy XII (Sole Reign)
58-57	Berenice IV and Cleopatra VI
57-55	Berenice IV (Sole Reign)
55-52	Ptolemy XII (Sole Reign)
52-51	Ptolemy XII and Cleopatra VII
51-48	Cleopatra VII and Ptolemy XIII – under regency of Pothinus
48-47	Cleopatra VII; Ptolemy XIII and Arsinoe IV (In Opposition to Cleopatra VII)
47-44	Cleopatra VII and Ptolemy XIV
44-30	Cleopatra VII and Ptolemy XV

== Medieval Egypt ==
During the Middle Ages, Egypt was ruled by a succession of Islamic dynasties, and regencies were not uncommon. A famous example of a female regent is that of the Fatimid Sitt al-Mulk.

Regents of the Ikhshidid dynasty

1. Abu al-Misk Kafur (946-966) – de facto regent during the reigns of Unujur and Ali before becoming the de jure ruler of Egypt after the latter's death in 966.
2. Ja'far ibn al-Furat (968, 969) – regent during the early part of Abu'l-Fawaris Ahmad ibn Ali's reign before being deposed by Al-Hasan ibn Ubayd Allah ibn Tughj. He later resumed his duties after al-Hasan left Egypt.
3. Al-Hasan ibn Ubayd Allah ibn Tughj (968-969) – regent during the reign of Abu'l-Fawaris Ahmad ibn Ali until he decided to leave Egypt in February 969.

Regents of the Fatimid Caliphate

1. Barjawan (997-1000) – de facto regent during the reign of Al-Hakim bi-Amr Allah.
2. Sitt al-Mulk (1021-1023) – Regent during the reign of her nephew Ali az-Zahir.
3. Ali ibn Ahmad al-Jarjara'i (1036-1045) – Assumed the regency during the early part of Al-Mustansir Billah's reign.
4. Rasad (1045-1062) – While never formally regent, she wielded a great deal of power during the reign of her son Al-Mustansir Billah and was the effective head of state following the death of Ali ibn Ahmad al-Jarjara'i in 1045.
5. Al-Hafiz (1130, 1131-1132) – Briefly regent for At-Tayyib Abu'l-Qasim before At-Tayyib's disappearance or death, and was later overthrown by Kutayfat in 1130. Returned to power in December 1131 after Kutayfat was murdered and later proclaimed himself Caliph in January 1132.
6. Kutayfat (1130-1131) – Seized power in 1130 but was murdered by Fatimid forces loyal to the caliph in 1131.
7. Tala'i ibn Ruzzik (1154-1161) – Regent during the reigns of Al-Fa'iz bi-Nasr Allah and Al-Adid.

Regents of the Ayyubid dynasty

1. Shajar al-Durr (1249-1250) – de facto regent in the aftermath of As-Salih Ayyub's death and before the official accession of Turanshah. Later ruled as Sultan in her own right in 1250.

Regents of the Mamluk Sultanate

1. Izz al-Din Aybak (1250-1254) – Regent during Al-Ashraf Musa's reign. Briefly ruled as sultan before him and later deposed and replaced him as sultan in 1254.
2. Al-Mansur Qalawun (1279) – Regent during Badr al-Din Solamish's reign. Later deposed Solamish and became sultan.
3. Al-Adil Kitbugha (1293-1294) – Regent during Al-Nasir Muhammad's first reign. Later deposed Al-Nasir and became sultan.
4. Baibars II (1299-1309) – Regent during Al-Nasir Muhammad's second reign. Later replaced him as sultan.
5. Sayf al-Din Salar (1299-1309) – Regent during Al-Nasir Muhammad's second reign.
6. Qawsun (1341-1342) – Regent during Al-Ashraf Kujuk's reign.
7. Yalbugha al-Umari (1361-1366) – Regent for the entirety of the Al-Mansur Muhammad's reign and the early part of Al-Ashraf Sha'ban's reign.
8. Barquq (1377-1382) – Regent during the reigns of Al-Mansur Ali II and As-Salih Hajji before becoming Sultan himself.

== Modern Egypt ==
The Muhammad Ali Dynasty, which ruled Egypt from 1805 until 1953, witnessed three different regencies.

=== Regency during Muhammad Ali's illness ===
Ibrahim Pasha presided the Regency Council that was formed on 15 April 1848 to run Egypt due to Muhammad Ali Pasha's declining physical and mental health. Legal documents were still written in the latter's name; however, Ibrahim Pasha became the de facto ruler of the country from this moment on. On 20 July of the same year, an extraordinary envoy of Ottoman Sultan Abdülmecid I arrived in Alexandria with the firman by which the Porte recognized Ibrahim Pasha as Egypt's new wāli. The latter then travelled to Constantinople, where his investiture took place on 25 August in the presence of Sultan. However, his reign was very brief, and his death occurred shortly after his return to Cairo. He died on 10 November 1848 due to ill health, thus predeceasing his father.

=== Regency during Farouk I's minority ===
A Regency Council was established following the death of King Fuad I, since his son Farouk was still a minor. Prior to his death, Fuad I had named in a formal document the three members who were to serve on the Regency Council: Adli Yakan Pasha (a former Prime Minister who had already died by the time Farouk I became King), Tawfiq Nasim Pasha (another former Prime Minister) and Mahmoud Fakhri Pasha (a former Foreign Minister married to Fuad I's eldest daughter Princess Fawkia). However, Parliament rejected King Fuad I's choices, and appointed three totally different regents: Prince Muhammad Ali (son of the late Khedive Tawfiq Pasha and thus first cousin of King Farouk I), Aziz Ezzat Pasha (a former Foreign Minister married to Behiye Yakan Hanem, another cousin of Farouk I) and Sherif Sabri Pasha (Farouk I's maternal uncle). The Regency Council was formally sworn in on 8 May 1936 in front of a joint session of Parliament. King Farouk I assumed his full constitutional powers upon reaching his age of majority (fixed at 18 years and calculated according to the Islamic calendar) on 29 July 1937.

=== Regency during Fuad II's minority ===
From left to right: Prince Abdel Moneim, Barakat Pasha and Rashad Mehanna.

The Revolution of July 1952 did not immediately lead to the abolition of the monarchy. King Farouk I abdicated in favour of his six-month-old son Ahmad Fuad, who ascended the throne as King Fuad II. However, the latter only reigned as a nominal king-in-exile. Initially, his powers were assumed during a week by the Cabinet, headed at the time by Ali Maher Pasha. On 2 August 1952, a temporary regency "body" (not a formal Regency Council) was created. Headed by Prince Muhammad Abdel Moneim (son of the late Khedive Abbas Helmi II and Fuad II's second cousin), the three-member Regency Body also included Bahey El Din Barakat Pasha (a former Minister of Education and Speaker of Parliament) and Rashad Mehanna (a colonel appointed as representative of the Army). The Regency Body was dissolved on 7 September 1952, and Prince Muhammad Abdel Moneim was appointed as sole Prince regent. However, throughout this period, real powers lay in the hands of the Revolutionary Command Council. The monarchy was formally abolished on 18 June 1953: Egypt was declared a republic for the first time in its history, and Muhammad Naguib became its first ever President.
