= Aziz Ezzat Pasha =

Egyptian politician

Sahib ul-Makam al-Rafi Aziz Ezzat Pasha GCVO
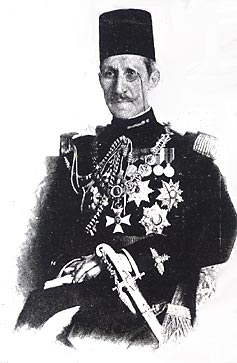

1st Egyptian Minister Plenipotentiary to the United Kingdom
- In office 1923–1927
- Monarch: Fuad I
- Succeeded by: Sesostris Sidaros

Foreign Minister of Egypt
- In office 18 February 1935 – 30 January 1936
- Monarch: Fuad I
- Prime Minister: Muhammad Tawfiq Nasim Pasha
- Preceded by: Kamel Ibrahim Bey
- Succeeded by: Ali Mahir Pasha

Regent of Egypt
- In office 28 April 1936 – 29 July 1937
- Monarch: Farouk I

Personal details
- Born: 24 June 1869 Cairo, Egypt Eyalet, Ottoman Empire
- Died: 12 April 1961 (aged 91)
- Spouse: Behiye Yeghen Hani
- Children: Aysha Ezzat Hanem; Muhammad Ezzat; Abdullah Ezzat
- Education: University of Cambridge; Royal Military Academy, Woolwich
- Profession: Diplomat

Military service
- Rank: General

Aziz Ezzat Pasha (Arabic: عزيز عزت باشا) (24 June 1869 – 12 April 1961) was an Egyptian politician.

== Foreign Ministry ==
Born in Cairo and of Albanian origin, he was a descendant of Muhammad Ali Pasha through his mother, Princess Fatma Fazil. Aziz Ezzat Pasha was educated at Jesus College, Cambridge and the now defunct Royal Military Academy, Woolwich. He began his career in the court of Khedive Isma'il Pasha and was then promoted to deputy minister of foreign affairs. Following the United Kingdom's unilateral grant of independence to Egypt in 1922, he was appointed as Egypt's first minister plenipotentiary to the Court of St. James's, serving for five years, from 1923 until 1927. He served as Egypt's Foreign Minister from 18 February 1935 until 30 January 1936.

== Regency ==
Aziz Ezzat Pasha was a member of the Regency Council during King Farouk I's minority. He served as regent from 28 April 1936 until 29 July 1937, alongside Prince Muhammad Ali Tewfik and Sherif Sabri Pasha. As such, he was allocated E£15,000, a huge sum at that time.

== Al-Ahly ==
Aziz Ezzat Pasha was greatly involved with the famous Egyptian sports club Al Ahly. On 2 April 1908, he became the club's second president. He was the first Egyptian to hold that post, and kept it until 9 February 1916. He later became Honorary President of the club (1929-1941).

== Family ==
Aziz Ezzat Pasha's second wife, Behiye Yeghen Hanim, whom he married in 1892, was a granddaughter of Khedive Isma'il Pasha from her mother's side. Their daughter Aysha Hanim (1893 - 1945) married in 1912 (and later divorced in 1927) Prince Muhammad Ali Hassan Pasha, another grandson of Khedive Isma'il.

Sporting positions
Preceded by Mitchell Ince	President of Al-Ahly Club; 2 April 1908 – 9 February 1916	Unknown Title next held by Abdel Khaliq Sarwat Pasha
Honorary titles
Preceded by Muhammad Mahmoud Pasha	Honorary President of Al-Ahly Club; 29 November 1929 – 21 October 1941	Succeeded by Muhammad Sherif Sabri
Diplomatic posts
New title Egyptian Independence	Egyptian Minister Plenipotentiary to the United Kingdom; 1923 – 1927	Succeeded by Sesostris Sidaros
Political offices
Preceded by Kamel Ibrahim Bey	Foreign Minister of Egypt; 18 February 1935 – 30 January 1936	Succeeded by Ali Mahir Pasha
New title Minority of King Farouk I	Regent of Egypt; 1936 - 1937 with Prince Muhammad Ali Tewfik; Sherif Sabri Pasha	Farouk I reaches age of majority and assumes his full constitutional powers
