= Sherif Sabri Pasha =

Egyptian politician

- Born: 1895; Cairo
- Parents: Abdel Rahim Sabri Pasha (father); Tawfika Khanum Sherif (mother)

Sherif Sabri Pasha (Arabic: شريف صبري باشا, Turkish: Şerif Sabri Paşa), born in Cairo in 1895, was an Egyptian politician. He was the brother of Nazli Sabri, Queen consort of Egypt. He was thus the maternal uncle of Nazli's son King Farouk I, and served on the three-member Regency Council that was formed in 1936-37 during the latter's minority. Sherif Pasha Sabri was 41 years old at the time, and had previously held the post of Undersecretary for Foreign Affairs.

== Biography ==
He was educated at Khedivial School of Law, in Cairo.

He was born in 1895, in Cairo. His other sister was Amina Sabri.

In 1917, he became a member of Al Ahly and designed the club’s first logo.

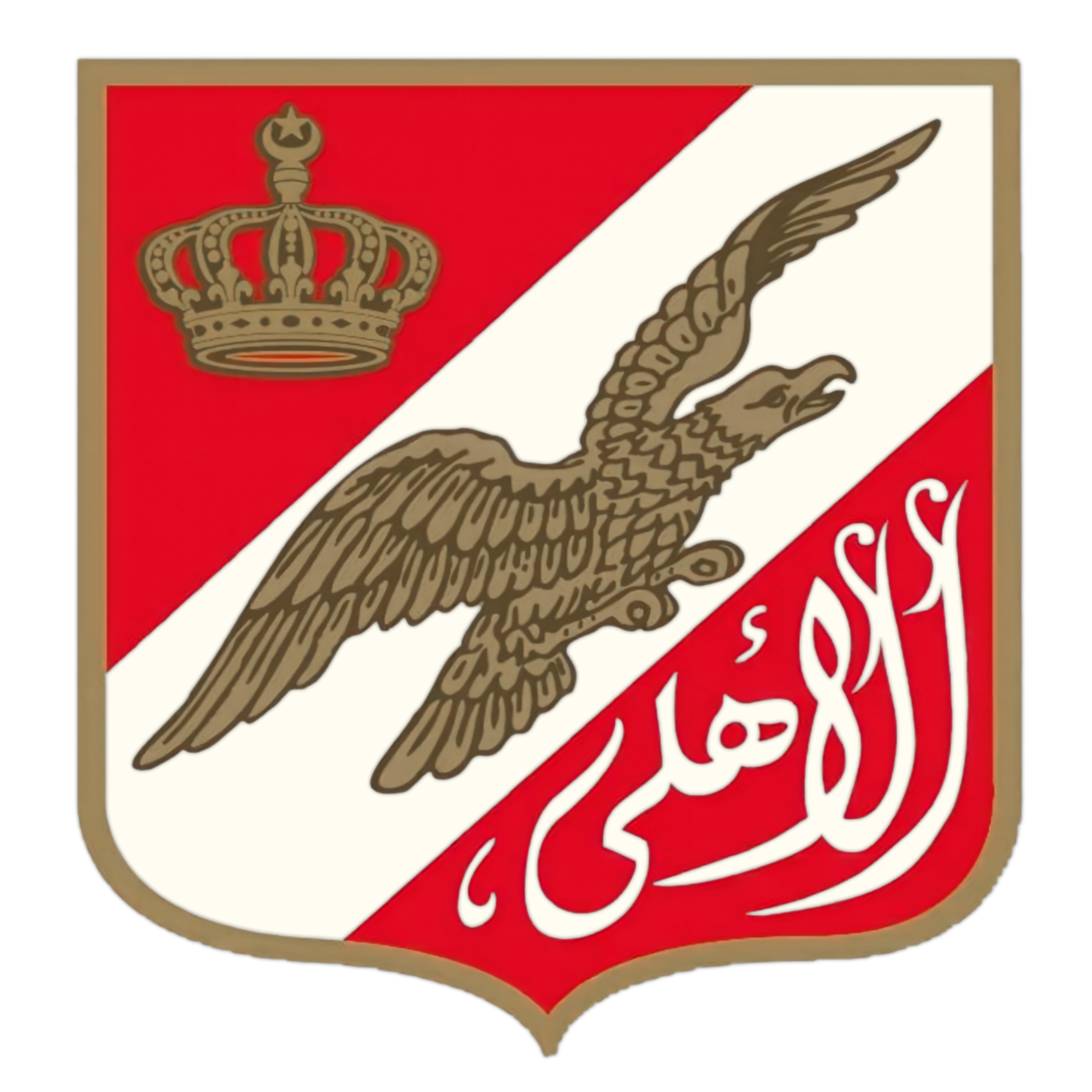
Al Ahly’s first logo designed by Sherif Sabri Pasha

On 30 September 1946, Sherif Sabri Pasha was asked to become Prime Minister and head a new cabinet. However, he never became premier and Ismail Sidqi Pasha remained Prime Minister until 9 December 1946.

Sherif Sabri Pasha headed the Royal Egyptian Geographic Society from May 1946 till March 1955. Like his sisters Nazli and Amina, he was a grandson of Egypt's three-time prime minister Mohamed Sherif Pasha who was of Turkish origin, as well as a great-grandson of Napoleon Bonaparte's colonel Soliman Pasha al-Faransawi (né Joseph Anthelme Sève).

In 1922 he married Naila Khanum (1895-1933), only daughter of Adly Yeghen Pasha by his wife, Zainab Khanum. They had one son and two daughters.

== Positions ==
- Director-General of Ministry of Foreign Affairs (1925-1929).
- Under-Secretary of State (1929-1933).
- Envoy Extraordinary and Minister Plenipotentiary (1933-1936).
- Member of the Regency Council (1936-1937).
- President of the Royal Egyptian Geographic Society (1946-1955).
- President of the Supreme Council of the Arab Museum.
- President of Egyptian Shipping Company.
- President of Egyptian Construction and Engineering Company.
- President of Nile Insurance Company.

== See also ==
- Sherif

Political offices
New title Minority of King Farouk I	Regent of Egypt; 1936 - 1937 with Prince Muhammad Ali Tewfik; Aziz Ezzat Pasha	King Farouk I reaches age of majority and assumes his full constitutional powers
Professional and academic associations
Preceded by W.F. Hume	President of the Egyptian Geographic Society; 1946–1955	Succeeded by Moustafa Amer
