= Mohammed Ali Tewfik =

Egyptian prince and heir presumptive to the throne of Egypt and Sudan (1875–1955)

Prince Mohammed Ali Tewfik
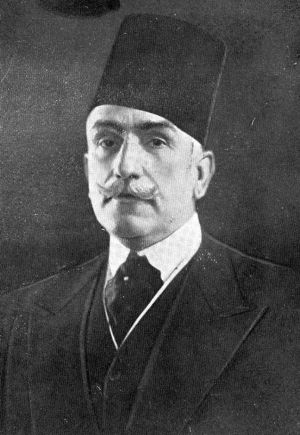
- Born: 9 November 1875; Cairo, Egypt Eyalet, Ottoman Empire
- Died: 18 March 1955 (aged 79); Lausanne, Vaud, Switzerland
- Burial: Hosh al-Basha Mausoleum, Mamluk Desert Cemetery, Cairo
- Spouse: Suzanne Hémon (m. 1941)
- Arabic: الأمير محمد علي توفيق
- House: Alawiyya
- Father: Tewfik I
- Mother: Emina Ilhamy

Mohammed Ali Tewfik (Arabic: محمد علي توفيق, romanized: Muḥammad ʿAlī Tawfīq; 9 November 1875 – 18 March 1955), also referred to as Mohammed Ali Pasha (محمد علي باشا, Muḥammad ʿAlī Bāshā), was the heir presumptive of Egypt and Sudan in the periods 1892–1899 and 1936–1952. He was a member of the Muhammad Ali dynasty.

== Early life ==
He was born in Cairo, the son of Khedive Tewfik I and Emina Ilhamy, and the younger brother of Khedive Abbas II. He attended higher education in Abdeen, then was sent to Europe to complete his formation, studying military sciences in Geneva, Switzerland. He returned to Egypt upon the death of his father in 1892.

== Regency ==
Following the death of King Fuad I in 1936, he served briefly as the chief regent for the 16-year-old King Farouk I until his coronation.

In January 1952, his hopes of ruling were ended by the birth of King Farouk's son Ahmed Fuad. In 1953, Egypt was declared a republic and Mohammed Ali lived the rest of his life in exile and died in Lausanne, Switzerland, in 1955.

== Personal life and wealth ==
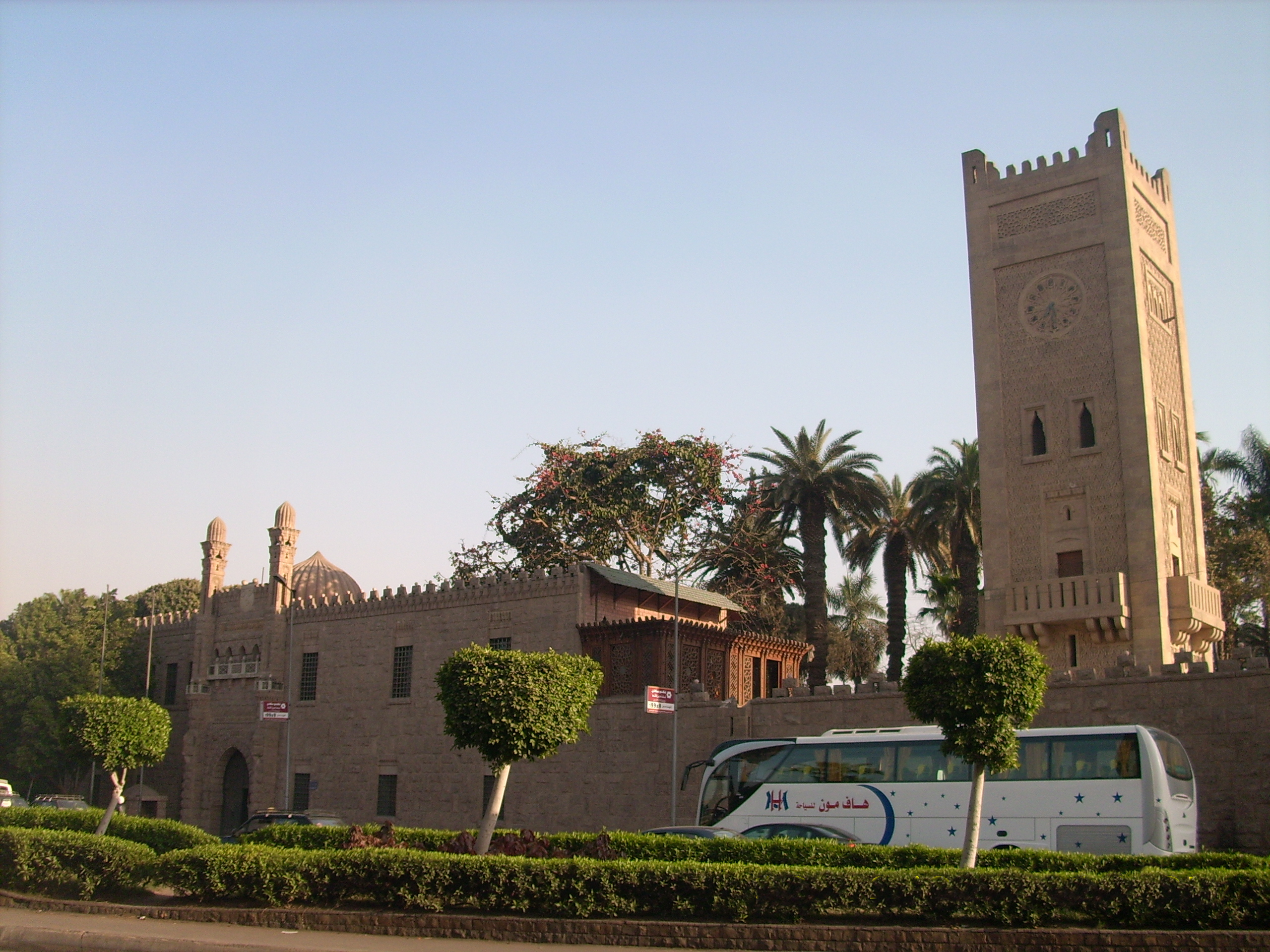
Al-Manial Palace, Cairo

Despite being the heir presumptive for a number of years, Mohammed Ali stayed away from politics and mainly focused on traveling, particularly as a private citizen. He kept travel diaries that were later published. He visited many European countries during his formation years (including the cities of Vienna and Paris), and later returned to the continent to visit Bosnia-Herzegovina. He also traveled to several places in Africa, America and Asia – including South Africa, Java, Russia, Korea, Japan, Syria (Damascus) and Lebanon. The reason for the latter two destinations was his love for breeding Arabian horses (shared with his ancestor Abbas Pasha I), a topic he also wrote a book about. Alongside his native Arabic, he spoke French, German, English and Turkish.

Having suffered an accident, he was prevented from getting married at a young age. On 25 November 1941, he married morganatically the former French actress Suzanne Hémon.

In the early 20th century, the prince ordered the construction of a great palace in Cairo, al-Manial, with a large number of rooms decorated in different styles from Egypt and around the world. He kept there a wide collection of artifacts. The palace is now open to the public as the Manial Palace and Museum.

== Notable published works ==
- Al-Riḥla al-Amrīkiyya (????)
- Riḥlat al-Ṣayf ilā bilād al-Būsna wa-l-Harsak (1906)
- Al-Riḥla al-Yābāniyya (1909)
- Al-Riḥla al-Shāmiyya (1911)
- Mon journal de voyage en Afrique du Sud (1923)
- Riḥlat sumuww al-amīr al-jalīl Muḥammad ʿAlī ilā Jāwa (1926)
- Breeding of Purebred Arab Horses (1936)
- Souvenirs de Jeunesse: Le Theresianum (Vienne de mon temps) (1948)
- Ma jeunesse à Paris (1950)

== Honours ==
- 1911: Grand Cordon of the Order of Leopold.

== Sources ==
- İshakoğlu, Ömer (2021). "Amīr Mehmed Ali Pasha's Travelogue to Bosnia-Herzegovina". The Journal of Southeastern European Studies (36). Istanbul University Press: 119–133. doi:10.26650/gaad.899591.
- "كتب ومؤلفات محمد علي". Hindawi (in Arabic).

Egyptian royalty
New title Minority of King Farouk I	Regent of Egypt; 1936–1937 with Aziz Ezzat Pasha; Sherif Sabri Pasha	King Farouk I reaches age of majority
