= Muhammad Abdel Moneim =

Crown Prince of Egypt and Sudan (1899-1979)

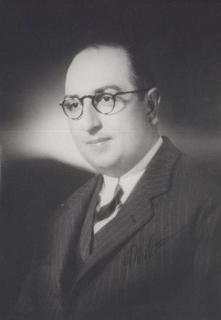
- Abdel Moneim c. 1951

Crown Prince of Egypt and Sudan
- Heirdom: 20 February 1899 – 19 December 1914
- Predecessor: Mohammed Ali Tewfik
- Successor: Fuad I of Egypt

Regent of Egypt and Sudan
- Regency: 26 July 1952 – 18 June 1953
- Born: 20 February 1899; Montaza Palace, Alexandria, Egypt
- Died: 1 December 1979 (aged 80); Ortaköy, Istanbul, Turkey
- Burial: Cairo, Egypt
- Spouse: Neslişah Sultan (m. 1940)
- Issue: Prince Abbas Hilmi; Princess Ikbal
- Dynasty: Muhammad Ali
- Father: Abbas II of Egypt
- Mother: Ikbal Hanim

Damat Prince Muhammad Abdel Moneim Beyefendi (20 February 1899 – 1 December 1979) was an Egyptian prince and heir apparent to the throne of Egypt and Sudan from 1899 to 1914. Upon the abdication of King Farouk following the Egyptian Revolution of 1952, he served as Regent for King Ahmed Fuad II until the declaration of the Republic of Egypt and abolition of the Egyptian and Sudanese monarchy in 1953.

== Early life ==
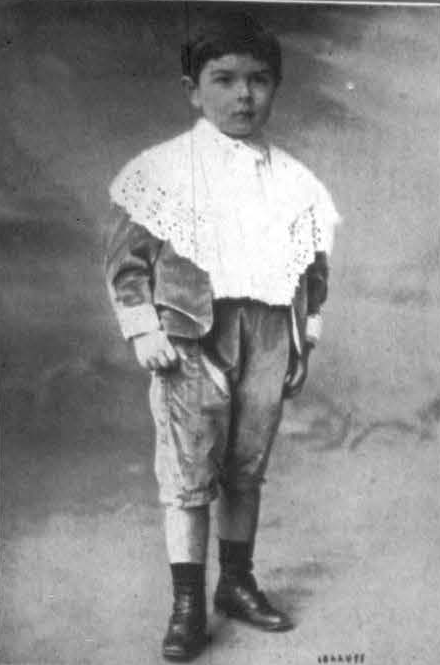
Young Abdel Moneim in the 1900s

Prince Muhammad Abdul Moneim was born at the Montaza Palace, near Alexandria. His father, Abbas II, was the reigning Khedive, so Prince Muhammad Abdul Moneim became heir apparent upon his birth and was given the title of Hereditary Prince. He was educated at Fribourg, Switzerland. Following the Ottoman Empire's entry into World War I, Muhammad Abdul Moneim's father, Khedive Abbas II, was deposed by Britain on 18 December 1914 for supporting the Ottomans in the War. His father was replaced on the throne by his uncle Hussein Kamel, bypassing Muhammad Abdul Moneim, who was now demoted in the line of succession. He was created His Highness in 1922.

In 1927, he returned to then Kingdom of Egypt. In 1933, he and his cousin, Prince Youssouf Kamal, visited the United States and Canada. He served as President of the Egyptian Olympic Committee from 1934 until 1938. In 1938, he reportedly asked King Farouk for permission to marry Myzejen Zogu, sister of King Zog I of the Albanians.

In 1939 he was appointed President of the Arab delegation to the Palestine Conference in London.

== Regency ==
Following the abdication of King Farouk, Prince Muhammad Abdul Moneim served as Chairman of the Council of Egyptian Regency from 26 July 1952 to 18 June 1953 for the infant King Fuad II, being created Royal Highness in 1952. The regency came to an end when Major General Muhammad Naguib took power and declared Egypt a republic, ending the rule of the Muhammad Ali Dynasty.

In December 1957, he was arrested for attempting to overthrow Nasser and return the monarchy.

== Death ==
He died in Ortaköy, Istanbul, and was buried in Cairo.

== Family ==
Muhammad Abdul Moneim married his third cousin Princess Fatma Neslişah Osmanoğlu Sultan (4 February 1921 – 2 April 2012) at the Heliopolis Palace, Cairo, on 26 September 1940. She was a daughter of Prince Şehzade Omer Faruk (1898–1969/1971) and his first wife and cousin, Princess Rukiye Sabiha Sultan (1894–1971). Fatma Neslişah was also paternal granddaughter of the last Ottoman Caliph Abdülmecid II by his first wife and maternal granddaughter of the last Ottoman Sultan Mehmed VI by his first wife.

Muhammad Abdul Moneim and Fatma Neslişah had two children:

- Prince Sultanzade Abbas Hilmi (b. 16 October 1941 in Cairo), married in Istanbul on 1 June 1969 to Mediha Momtaz (b. 12 May 1945 in Cairo), and has one daughter and one son:
  - Princess HGlory Nabila Sabiha Fatima Hilmi Hanım (b. 28 September 1974 in London)
  - Prince HGlory Nabil Daoud Abdelmoneim Hilmi Bey (b. 23 July 1979 in Paddington, London)
- Princess İkbal Hilmi Abdulmunim Hanımsultan (b. 22 December 1944), unmarried and without issue
