= Alexandria railway station (Egypt) =

Railway station in Egypt

Coordinates: 31.1929°N 29.9055°E

Alexandria railway station محطة قطار الإسكندرية
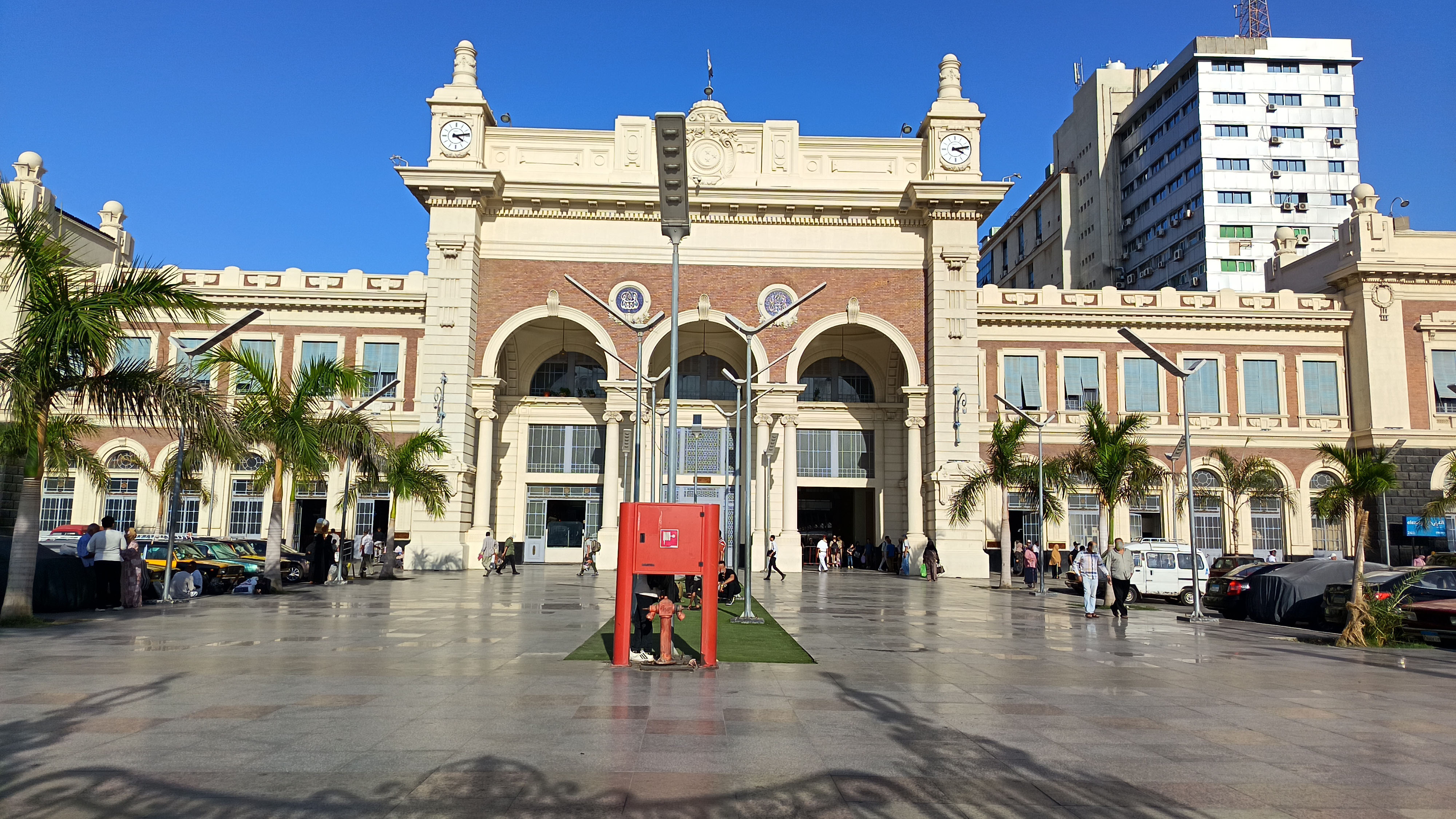
- Alexandria Train Station

General information
- Location: Al Marghani, Al Attarin, Alexandria Governorate 5370050; Egypt
- System: train station
- Owner: Egyptian Railways
- Operator: Egyptian Railways
- Platforms: 8
- Tracks: 8 above ground
- Connections: Sidi Gaber railway station

Construction
- Parking: yes

History
- Opened: 1856; 170 years ago
- Rebuilt: 1920
Location

Alexandria railway station is the main railway terminus in Alexandria, Egypt. It is the oldest railway station in the Middle East and Africa. It was established in 1856 coinciding with the decision of Khedive Abbas Hilmi II to establish the first railway line in Egypt linking the cities of Alexandria and Cairo in 1851, which is the second in the world after the establishment of the British railways shortly after.

In 1920, during the reign of King Fuad I, work began on expanding and rebuilding the station according to its current design. It was opened in 1927 by a Belgian company specializing in train stations. The reconstruction period took about seven years.

The station is located in Martyrs Square Central District in the city of Alexandria, and is owned and operated by the Egyptian Railways, and contains eight train platforms, ticket halls, an outdoor parking lot, administrative offices, a mosque, a restaurant, and several shops.

== History ==
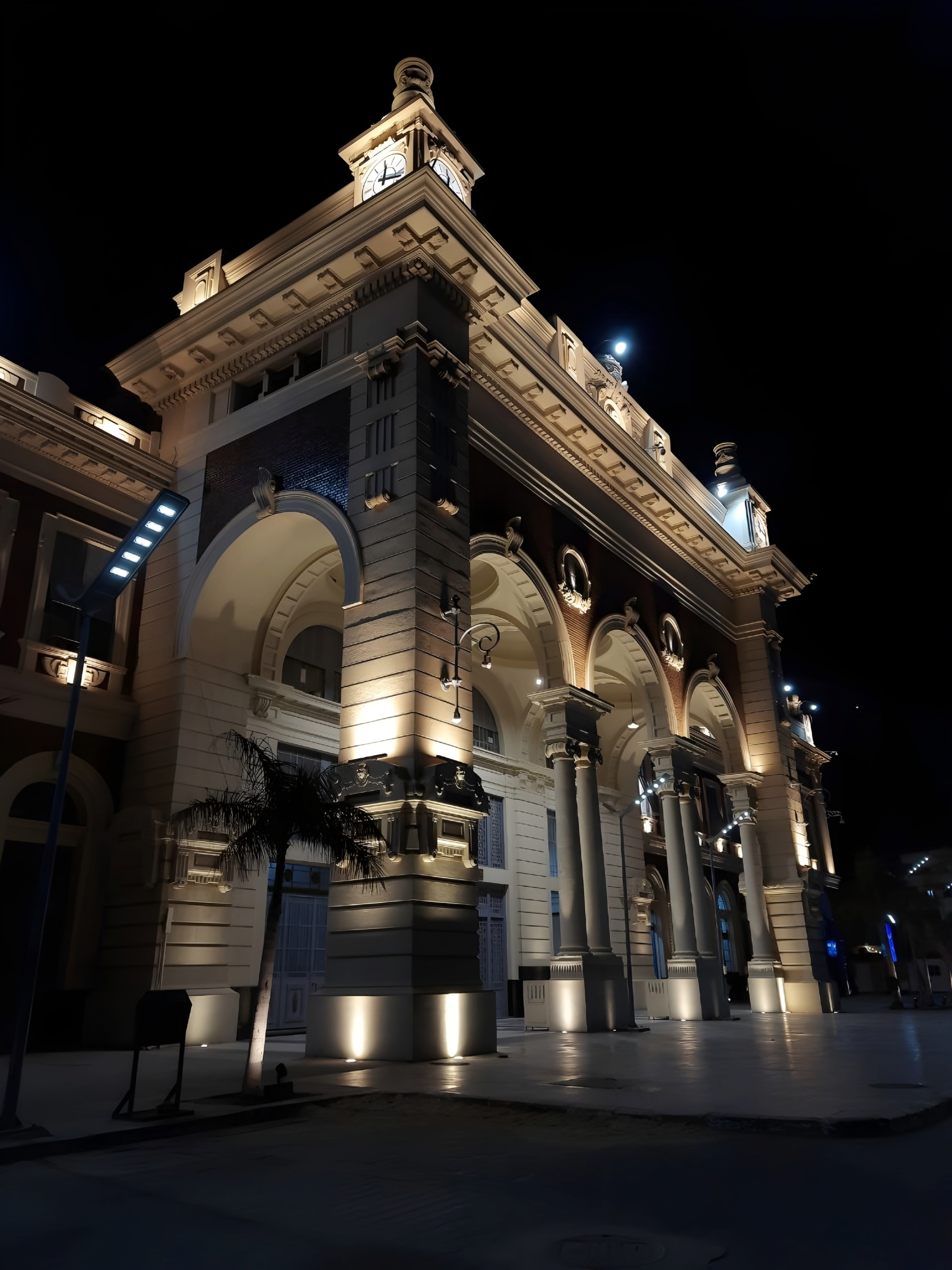
Misr Station gate

The station is the current terminus of the line, which was extended from Sidi Gaber railway station in 1876. The first station building at a location close to the current one was designed by Edwin C. Baines and built between 1856 and 1857. In 1918 a master plan for the city envisaged the rebuilding or the station. The current building was built between 1915 and 1927 by the Italian architect Antonio Lasciac.

== Gallery ==
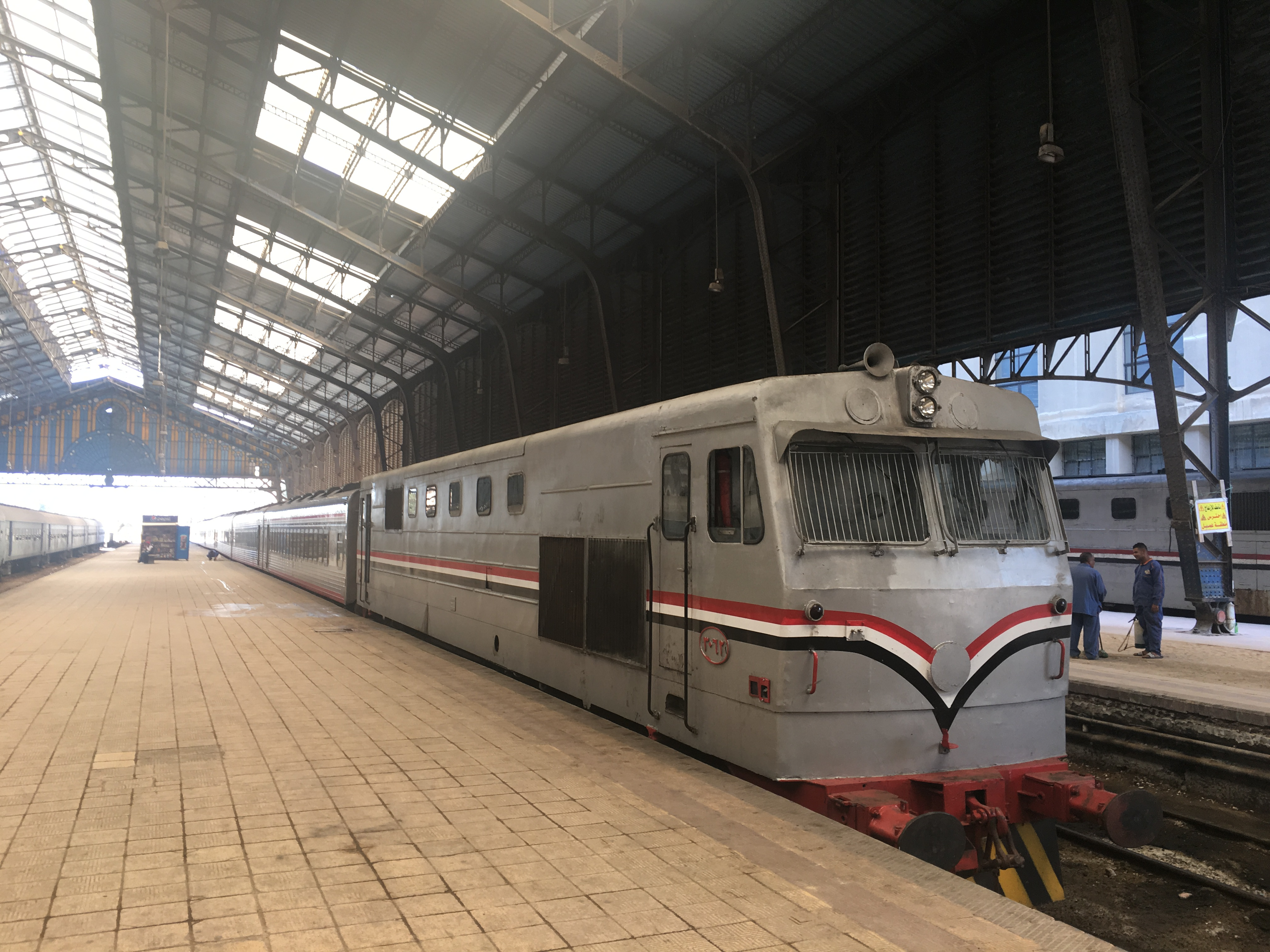

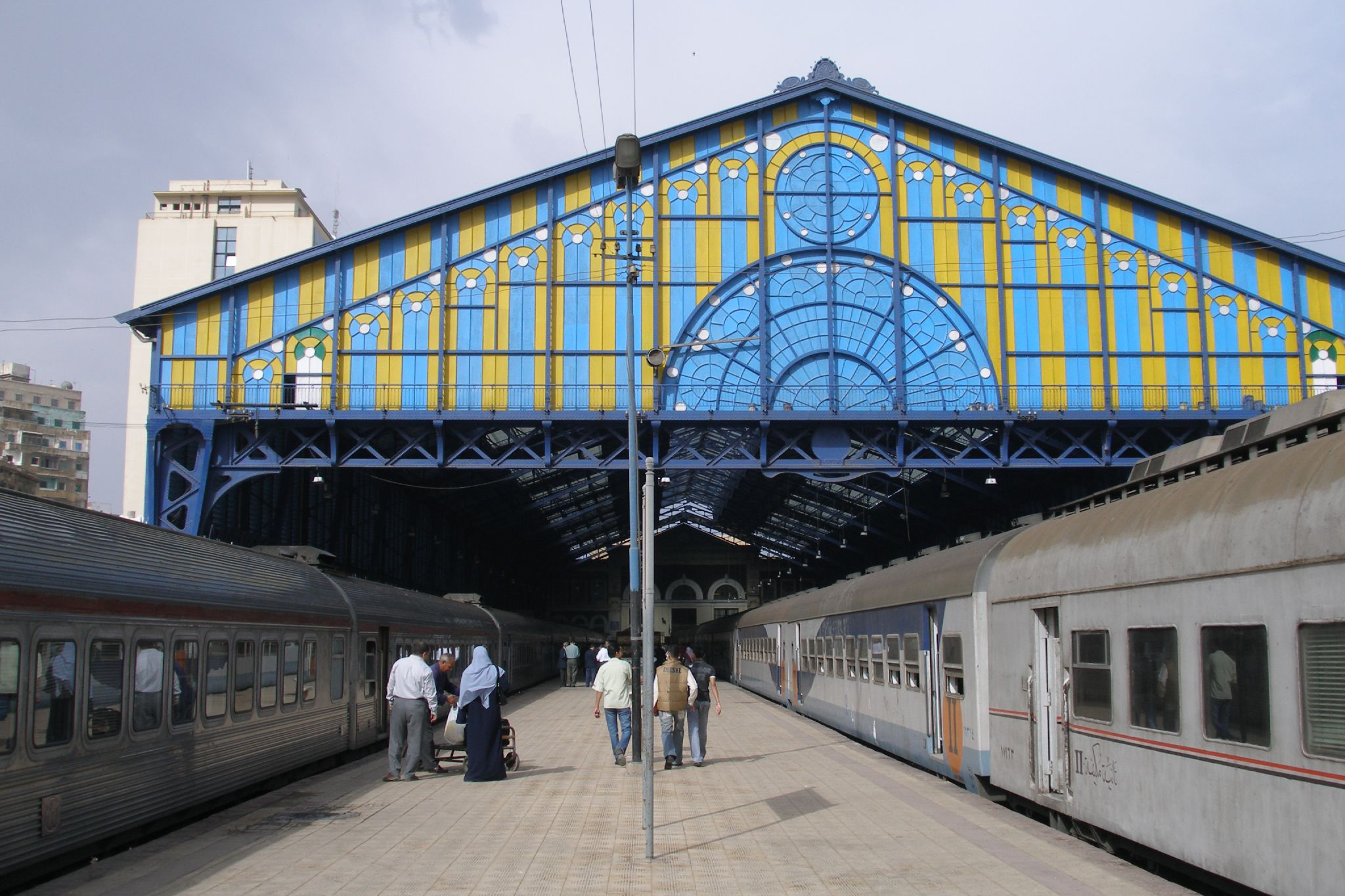

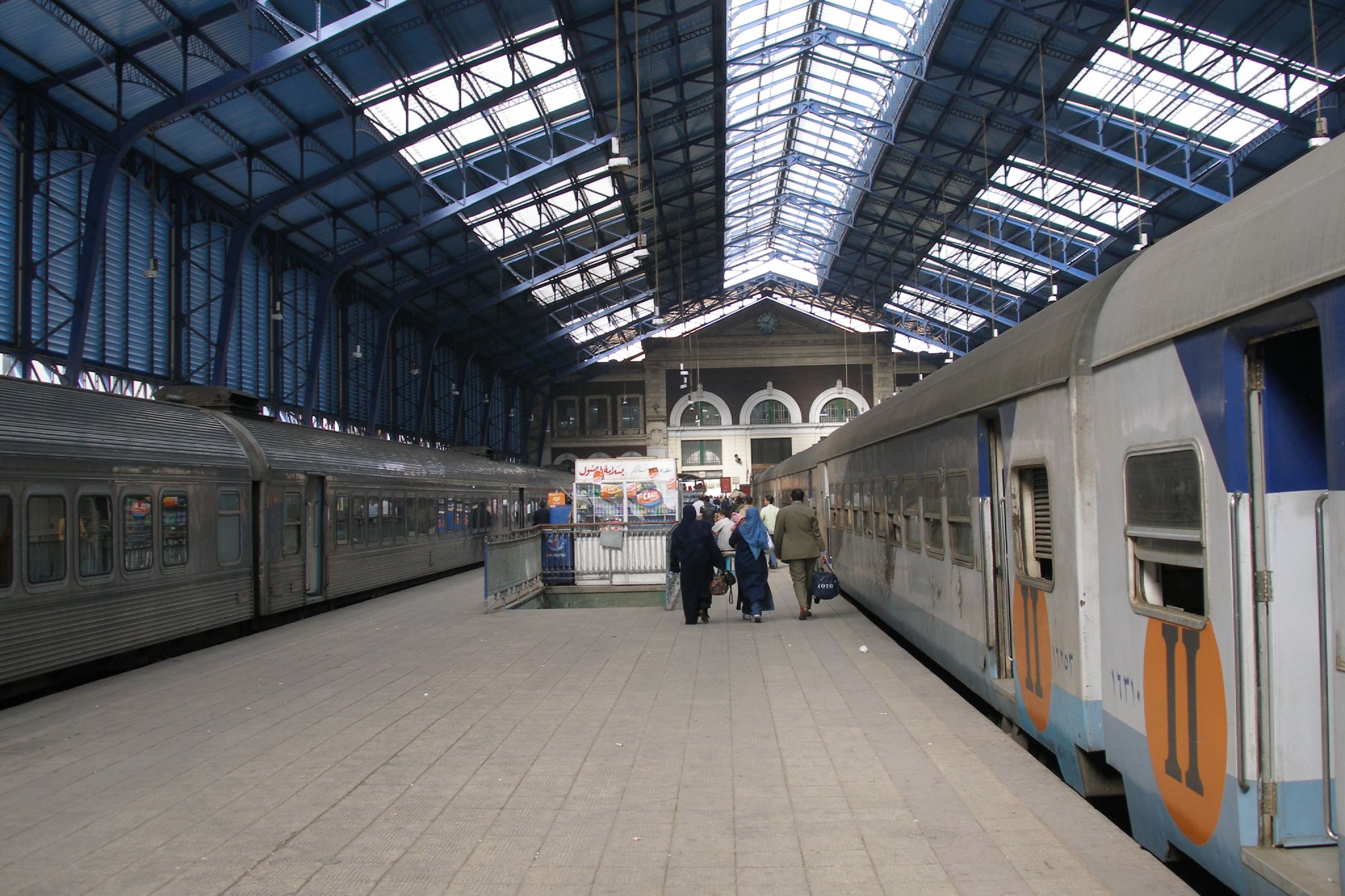

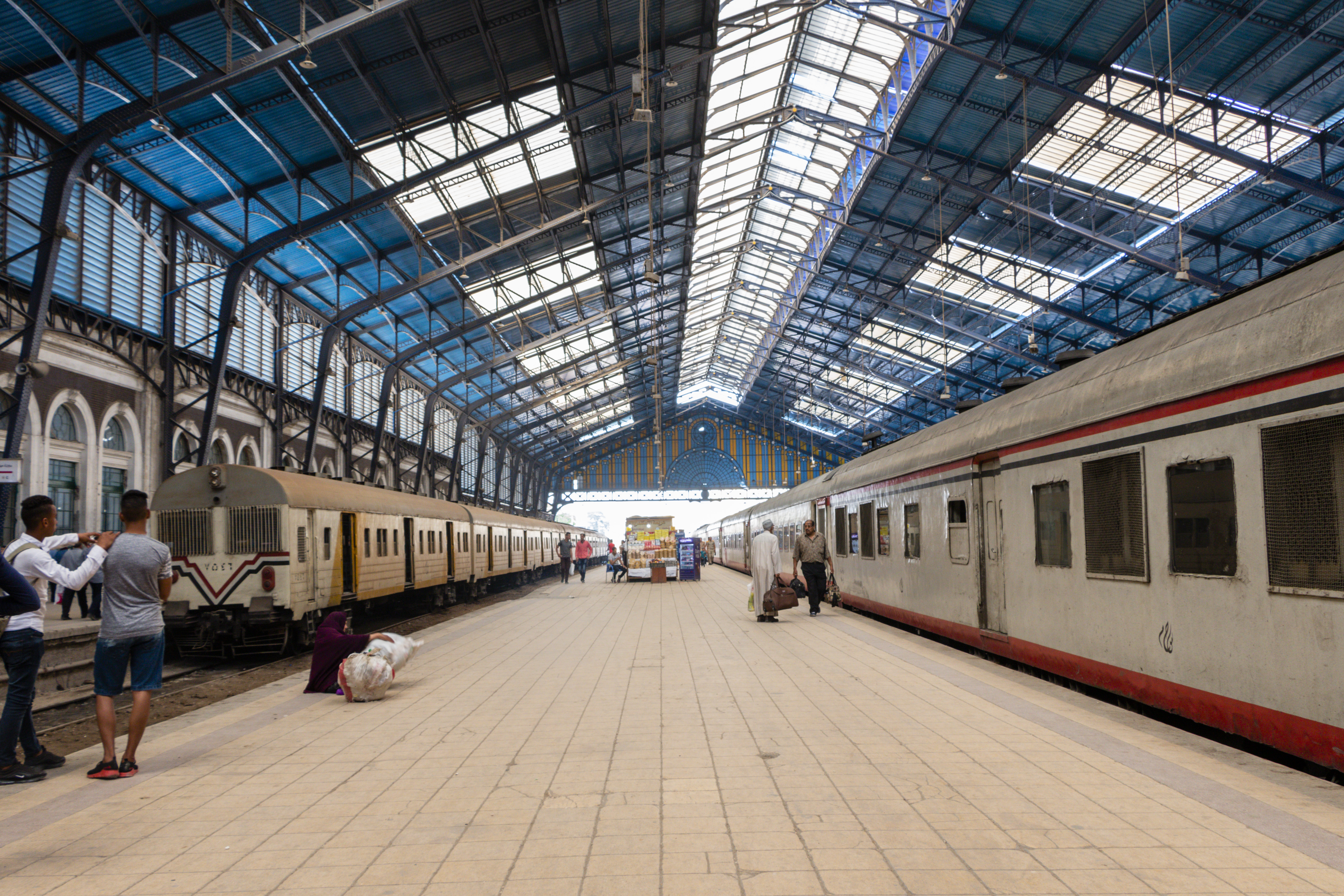

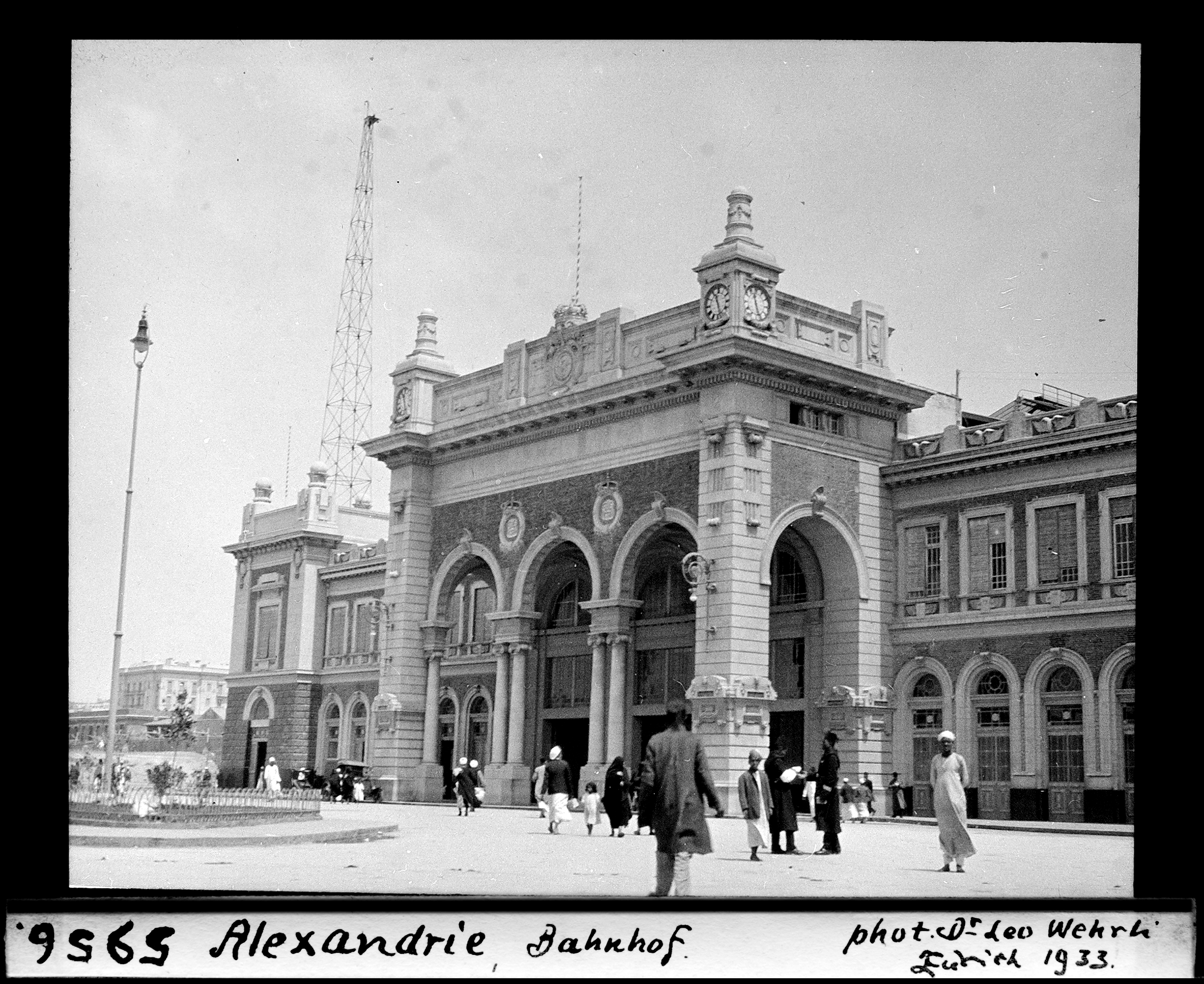

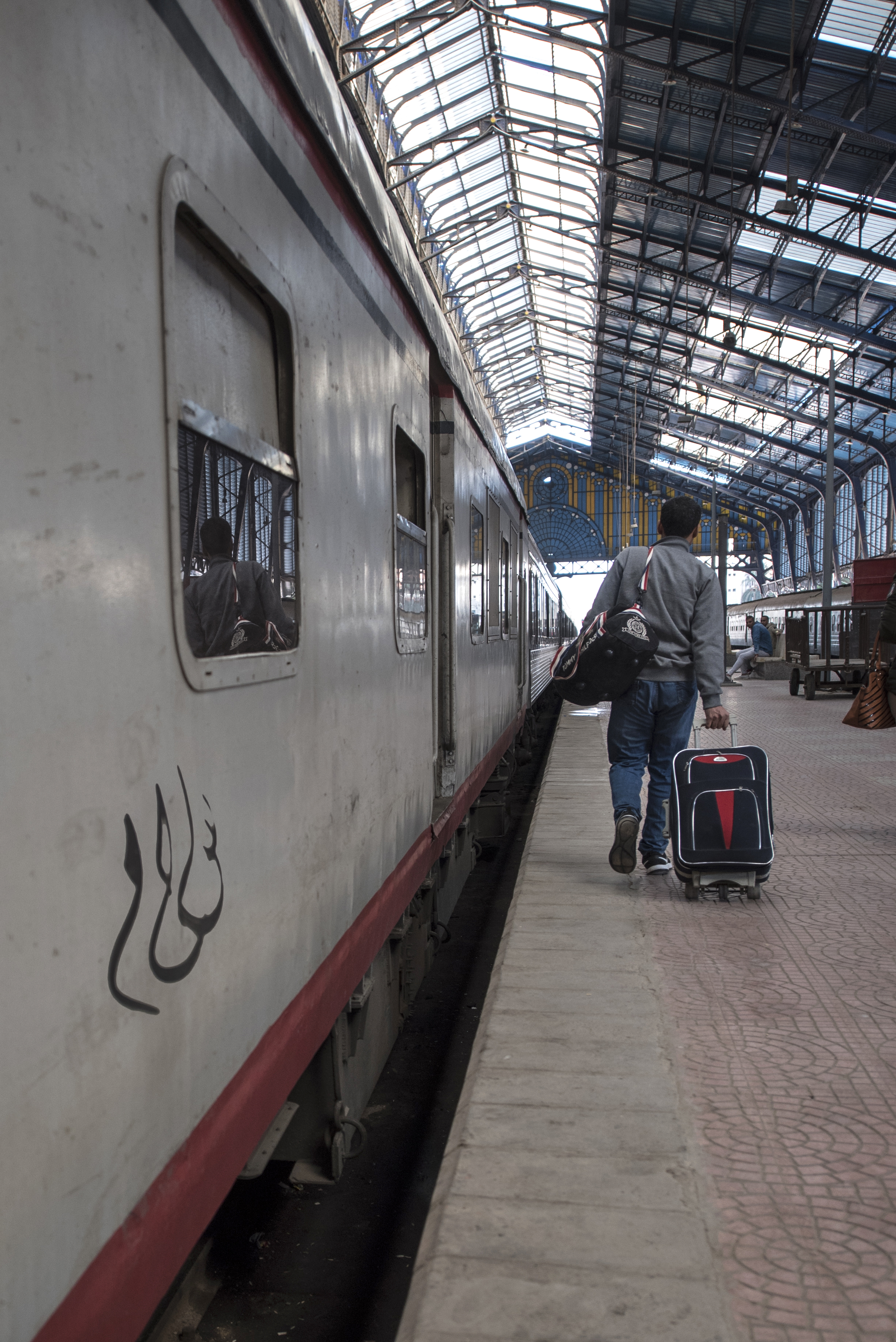

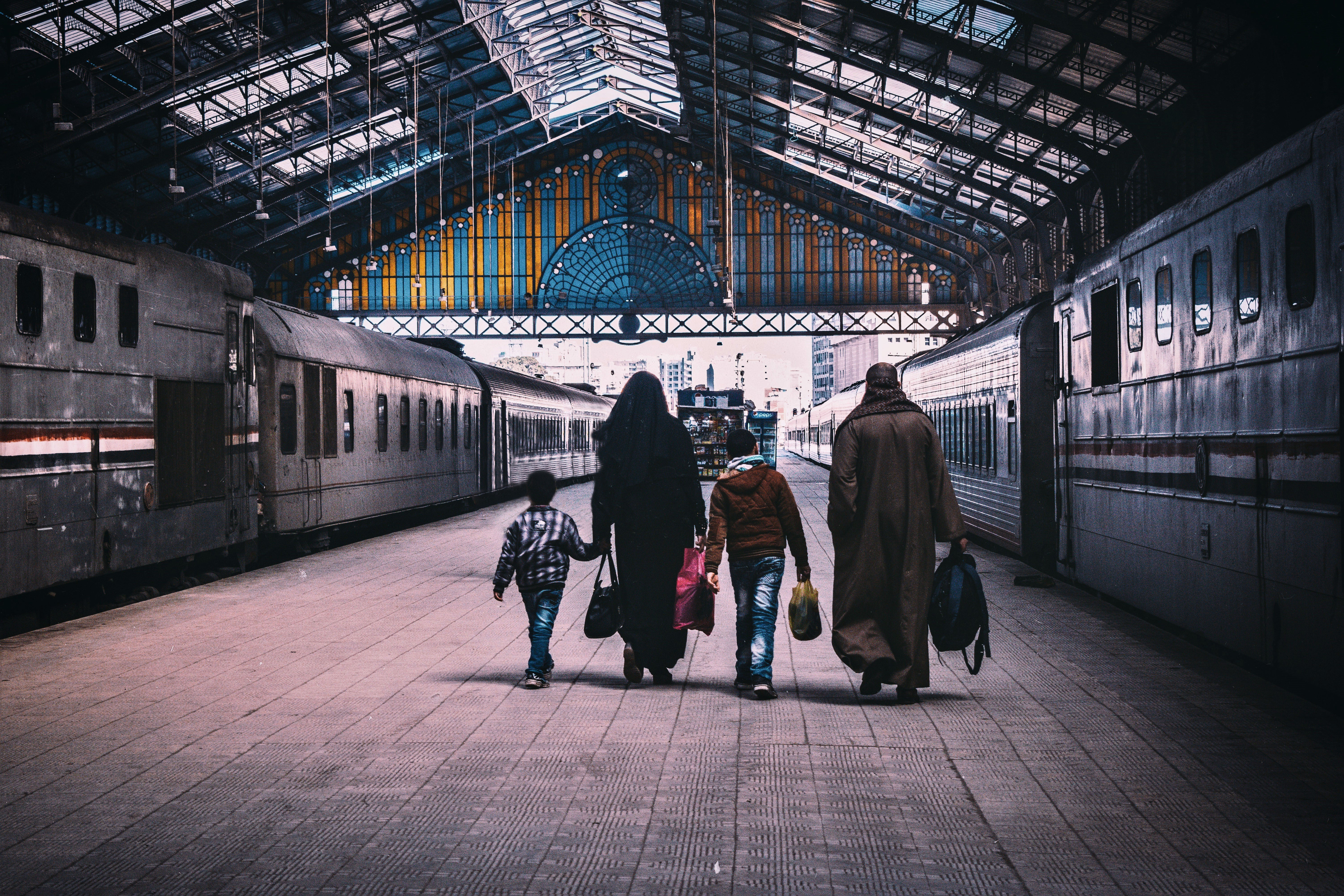

== See also ==
- Transport in Egypt
