= Khedive's Palace =

Coordinates: 41°06′18.00″N 29°04′25.68″E

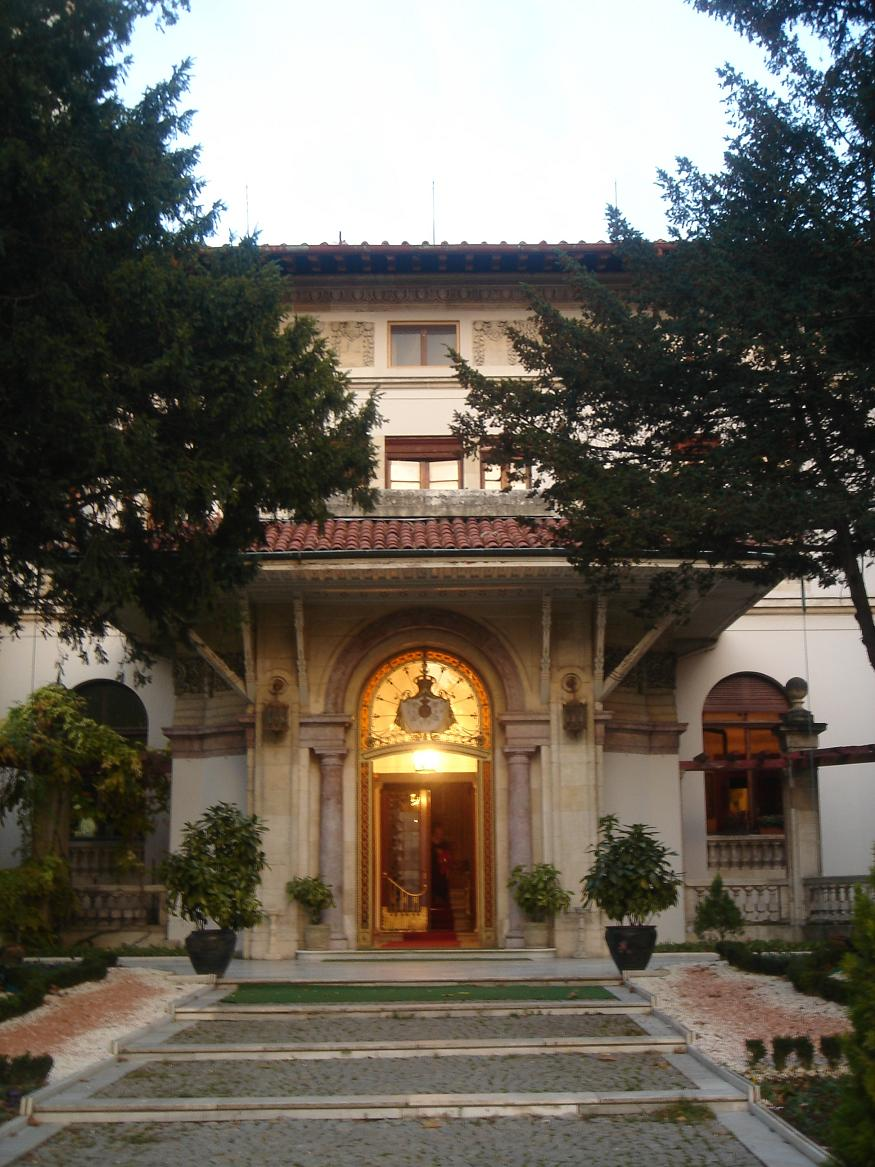
Khedive Palace Entrance

The Khedive's Palace (Turkish: Hıdiv Kasrı, "Khedive Palace"), also known as Çubuklu Palace (Çubuklu Sarayı), is located on the Asian side of the Bosphorus in Istanbul, Turkey, and was once the residence of Khedive Abbas II of Egypt and Sudan. In English it is also known as the Khedive's Pavilion or the Khedive's Mansion.

The 1,000 m^{2} (11,000 sq ft) palace stands on a hiltop within a large grove of some 270 acres (110 ha) above the Çubuklu neighborhood in the Beykoz district, overlooking the Istanbul Strait.

Completed in 1907, the three-storey palace was designed in Art Nouveau style, taking its inspiration from Italian villas of the Renaissance. However, it also incorporated elements of neo-classical Ottoman architecture. The east side is square, while the south and northwest sides feature crescent-shaped porticoes. The high, square tower is a unique feature visible from the opposite shore of the Bosphorus.

Several ground-floor rooms encircle a central hall, with one large hall featuring a fine fireplace. There are two bedrooms on the upper floor. Many of the walls, ceilings and marble capitals are carved with fruit, flowers and hunting animals reflecting European tastes. Stained glass is featured throughout. A monumental fountain inside the main entrance rises all the way to the roof. The rooftop terrace is accessible via a historic steam-operated elevator. The gate is decorated with gilded flowers.

There are other fine fountains and pools in the grounds. The rose garden is one of the largest in Istanbul.

A copy of the palace was built on the shore of the Nile in Egypt.

== History ==
Abbas II (reigned 1892–1914) was the last Khedive of Egypt and Sudan. Unlike his predecessors, Abbas II sought cooperative relations with the Ottoman Empire, whose sovereignty over the Khedivate (which continued to be an autonomous vassal of the Ottoman Empire until 1914) had effectively been rendered nominal ever since Muhammad Ali's seizure of power in 1805. Abbas saw this as a potential means of undermining the British occupation (since 1882) of Egypt and Sudan. As part of his efforts to improve relations with the Ottoman Porte, Abbas made several visits to the Ottoman capital Istanbul, and commissioned a Slovenian architect Antonio Lasciac (1856–1946) to work with the Italian architect Delfo Seminati to build a summer residence for him on the Bosphorus.

In her memoir "Harem", Abbas' unofficial and secret Hungarian second wife, Javidan Hanım (Lady Djavidan, born May Countess Torok von Szendro), described how she oversaw the palace's development right through to the interior design. She also designed the layout of the gardens, including the planting of the trees, the rose garden and the winding paths through the woods.

== Modern use ==
At the behest of Mustafa Kemal Atatürk, the founder and first President of Turkey, the City of Istanbul purchased the palace in 1937. However, by the 1980s it had fallen into neglect.

In 1979 the Touring and Automobile Club of Turkey (TTOK) signed an agreement with the Istanbul Municipality to restore and manage some of the city's Ottoman parks and historic sites for tourism. Under the guidance of TTOK's director general Çelik Gülersoy, the palace was restored over the next two years. It opened to the public in 1984.

The premises were managed by the TTOK for ten years with the inner halls used as a restaurant, the upper levels as a hotel, and the marble hall and surrounding gardens as a café. However, in 1994 the Istanbul Metropolitan Municipality took over the running of the establishment from the TTOK. The hotel facility is now closed.The building has the capacity to host meetings of up to 1000 people in summer, with cocktail facilities for up to 1500. In winter, it can accommodate up to 450 people and cocktails for 700.

The grounds of the Palace serve as a venue for the annual Istanbul Tulip Festival in April.

== See also ==
- Küçüksu Pavilion

== Sources ==
- Gülersoy, Çelik (1993). The Khedives and The Çubuklu Summer Palace: Çubuklu Kasrı. Istanbul: TTOK Yayınları. p. 236. ISBN 975-7641-19-7.
