= Ikbal Hanim =

First wife of Abbas II, last Khedive of Egypt and Sudan (1876-1941)

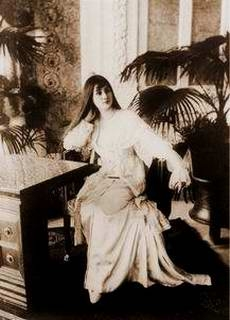

Khediva consort of Egypt
- Tenure: 19 February 1895 – 1910
- Born: 22 October 1876; Ottoman Empire
- Died: 1941 (aged 64–65)
- Spouse: Abbas Hilmi II of Egypt (m. 1895; div. 1910)
- Issue: Princess Emina Hanim; Princess Atiyatullah Hanim; Princess Fathiya Hanim; Prince Muhammad Abdel Moneim Pasha; Princess Lutfiya Shawkat Hanim; Prince Muhammed Abdel Kader Pasha
Names
- Arabic: اقبال هانم; Turkish: İkbal Hanım
- House: Alawiyya (by marriage)
- Religion: Sunni Islam

Ikbal Hanim (Arabic: اقبال هانم; Turkish: İkbal Hanım; 22 October 1876 – 1941), was the Khediva consort of Egypt from 1895 to 1910 as the first wife of Abbas II, the last Khedive of Egypt and Sudan.

== Early life ==
Of Circassian origin, Ikbal Hanim was born on 22 October 1876 in one of the northern Ottoman provinces. She became a slave to the Walida Pasha Emina Ilhamy, wife of Khedive Tewfik, in the harem of the Muhammad Ali dynasty via the Circassian slave trade after 1884, when the importation of white slaves became illegal in Egypt. She was then assigned to Abbas's personal service along with two other slave girls. She was described as tall and beautiful, had clear complexion and dark hair.

== Marriage ==
At his accession in 1892, Abbas was only seventeen years old and unmarried. His mother Emina took charge of the search for an appropriate princess for him to wed. She passed over his first cousin, Princess Aziza Hassan, and nearly succeeded in arranging a union for him with Naime Sultan, daughter of Sultan Abdul Hamid II.

In the meantime, Abbas began to have sexual relations with Ikbal, and on 12 February 1895, she gave birth to a girl, named Emina in honor of her grandmother. A contract of marriage between her and the khedive was written on 19 February, seven days later. At the public celebration the khedive’s mother hosted the women's reception. Ikbal eventually bore all of Abbas's six children, Princess Atiyatullah, born on 9 June 1896, Princess Fathiya, born on 27 November 1897, Prince Muhammad Abdel Moneim, born on 20 February 1899, Princess Lutfiya Shawkat, born on 29 September 1900, and Prince Muhammad Abdul Kadir, born on 4 February 1902.

By the standards of contemporary Ottoman ruling-class culture, the fathering of a child by a slave concubine was unexceptional, and so too was Abbas's decision to raise Ikbal to the status of legal wife. Both events were duly announced in al-Waqa'i' al-Misriyya, which also published some poetry written in honor of the khedival daughter. The announcements did not allude to Ikbal's previous slave status, something that would have been as rude as it was obvious to contemporaries familiar with upper-class harem culture.

Ikbal admired European fashion in dress and household practices and had European servants and governesses for her three daughters. She studied with her children and had an open, inquiring mind. As Khediva, Ikbal was considered one of Egypt's most beautiful women and was reputed to be a devoted wife, gaining her favor among those around the palace. However, aside from attending ladies-only state functions such as royal weddings or receptions and opera premiers, Ikbal Hanim had no official public role. On 15 May 1905, she made an official visit to Constantinople with her husband.

== Later life ==
Abbas came to believe that Ikbal was not a suitable compassionate mate. In 1900, he met Javidan Hanim, a Hungarian aristocrat from Philadelphia, during a holiday in Europe. He then married her secretly, while still being married to Ikbal, and she used to accompany him on trips. After Abbas divorced Ikbal in 1910, Javidan converted to Islam, and she and the khedive were remarried, officially, at the end of February 1910. The marriage was dissolved three years later in 1913. In her memoirs, Javidan mused, "it is curious to think that my husband has two wives." Ikbal, however, did not lose her prerogatives protocol-wise. She never remarried.

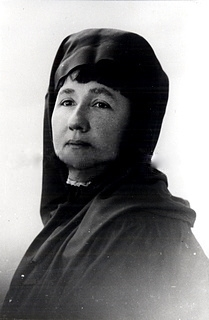
Ikbal Hanim in old age

In 1913, a year before his deposition in 1914, the khedive began seeing Georgette Mesny also known as Andrée de Lusange whom he met at Maxim's in Paris. The couple had returned to Egypt together aboard the MS Helwan. Lusange was a 20 years old short, lean, heavily painted woman who distributed her favors for 20 francs and once in the khedive's entourage spied for the French government. The scandal was unavoidable and Ikbal then moved to Constantinople.

Between 1923 and 1924, Ikbal brought legal case against her former husband. She was represented by Muhammad Kamel al-Bindari and he was represented by Ahmad Loutfy Bey. Mohamed Tawfik Naseem Pasha, the Minister of Finance, represented the committee created in the Ministry of Finance. The legal case concerned affairs relating to furniture and goods sold which had belonged to Ikbal during her marriage to the former khedive and before his goods had been sequestered. In addition to silver items, the case concerned objects of art that were on deposit in the National Bank of Egypt.

Ikbal owned a house in Heliopolis, which she had bought after selling her jewellery and her land in Kütahya. In 1925, she came in procession of Sultan Abdul Hamid II's son Şehzade Mehmed Abdülkadir's mansion in Feneryolu after the latter gave the power of attorney to Sami Günzberg, a well-known Turkish Jewish lawyer, authorising him to regain from usurpers buildings, lands, mines, concessions left by Abdul Hamid situated in Turkish territory and elsewhere. By 1940, she was a resident of Beirut, Lebanon. She died in 1941.

== Issue ==
Together with Abbas Ikbal had six children:

- Princess Emina (Montaza Palace, Alexandria, 12 February 1895 – 1954), unmarried and without issue, received decoration of the Order of Charity, 1st class, 31 May 1895;
- Princess Atiyatullah (Cairo, 9 June 1896 – 1971), married twice and had issue, three sons, received decoration of the Order of Charity, 1st class, 1 October 1904;
- Princess Fathiya (27 November 1897 – 30 November 1923), married without issue, received decoration of the Order of Charity, 1st class, 1 October 1904;
- Prince Prince Muhammad Abdel Moneim, Heir Apparent and Regent of Egypt and Sudan, (20 February 1899 – 1 December 1979), married and had issue, a son and a daughter;
- Princess Lutfiya Shavkat (Cairo, 29 September 1900 – 1975), married and had issue, two daughters, received decoration of the Order of Charity, 1st class, 20 July 1907;
- Prince Muhammad Abdul Kadir (4 February 1902 – Montreux, 21 April 1919);

== Honour ==
Foreign honour

- Ottoman Empire: Decoration of the Order of Charity, 1st class, 26 July 1895

== See also ==
- List of consorts of the Muhammad Ali Dynasty

== Sources ==
- Bardakçı, M.; Baran, M. (2017). Neslishah: The Last Ottoman Princess. American University in Cairo Press. ISBN 978-977-416-837-6.
- Cuno, Kenneth M. (April 1, 2015). Modernizing Marriage: Family, Ideology, and Law in Nineteenth- and Early Twentieth-Century Egypt. Syracuse University Press. ISBN 978-0-815-65316-5.
- Doumani, Beshara (February 1, 2012). Family History in the Middle East: Household, Property, and Gender. SUNY Press. ISBN 978-0-791-48707-5.
- Tugay, Emine Foat (1974). Three Centuries: Family Chronicles of Turkey and Egypt. Westport, Connecticut: Greenwood Press. ISBN 978-0-8371-7117-3. OCLC 799594.
- Haydn, J.; Vincent, B. (1904). Haydyn's Dictionary of Dates and Universal Information: Relating to All Ages and Nations. Ward, Lock.

Egyptian royalty
| Preceded by Emina Ilhamy | Khediva consort of Egypt; 19 February 1895 – 1910 | Succeeded by Javidan Hanim |
