= Margaret Murray (disambiguation) =

Margaret Murray (1863–1963) was a British Egyptologist and anthropologist.

Margaret Murray may also refer to:

- Margaret Deborah Murray or Margaret Murray Cookesley (1844–1927), English painter
- Margaret Lindsay Huggins (née Murray, 1848–1915), Irish scientist, contributor to the Encyclopædia Britannica
- Margaret Murray Washington (née Murray, 1865–1925), third wife of Booker T. Washington, Lady Principal of the Tuskagee Normal and Industrial Institute
- Margaret Polson Murray (1865–1927), Canadian social reformer and magazine editor
- Margaret "Ma" Murray (1908–1982), co-founder and editor of the Bridge River Lillooet News and the Alaska Highway News
- Margaret Murray (music educator) (1921–2015), British music educator
- Peg Murray (1924–2020), American actress
- Margaret Murray (baseball) (died 2006), All-American Girls Professional Baseball League player
- Maggie Murray (born 1942), British photojournalist and documentary photographer
- Margaret Murray Hanson (née Murray), American astronomer and academic
- Margaret Ransone Murray (1901–1986), American medical researcher
- Meg Murry, a character in the novels of Madeleine L'Engle
- Margaret Murray, later Margaret Murray-Benge, New Zealand local politician

== See also ==
- Murray (surname)
