= Antonio Lasciac =

Italian architect (1856–1946)

Antonio Lasciac (Italian) or Anton Laščak (Slovene)
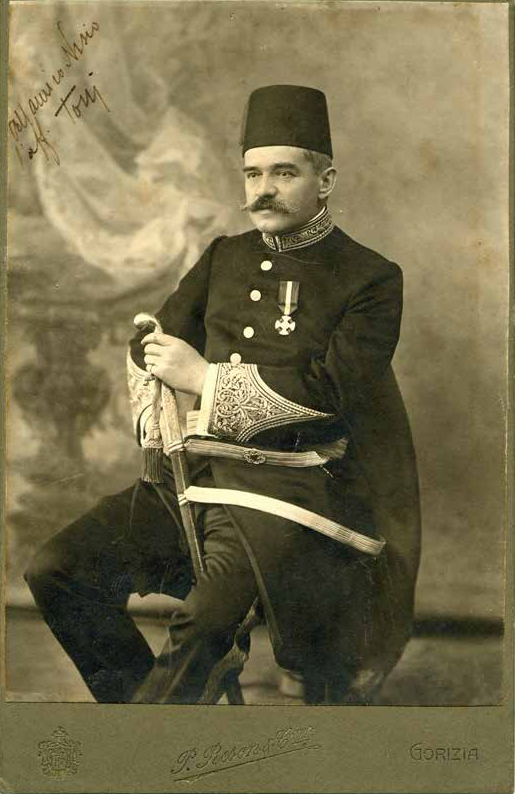
- Portrait photograph of Antonio Lasciac around 1906–1908
- Born: 21 September 1856; Gorizia, Austrian Empire
- Died: 26 December 1946 (aged 90); Cairo, Kingdom of Egypt
- Occupations: Architect, engineer, poet, musician
- Known for: Designing the Khedive's Palace in Istanbul and the Tahra Palace in Cairo
- Spouse: Maria Plesnizer

Antonio Lasciac (Italian) or Anton Laščak (Slovene) (21 September 1856 – 26 December 1946) was an Italian architect, engineer, poet and musician of Slovene descent, chiefly known for designing the Khedive's Palace in Istanbul and the Tahra Palace in Cairo.

== Life ==
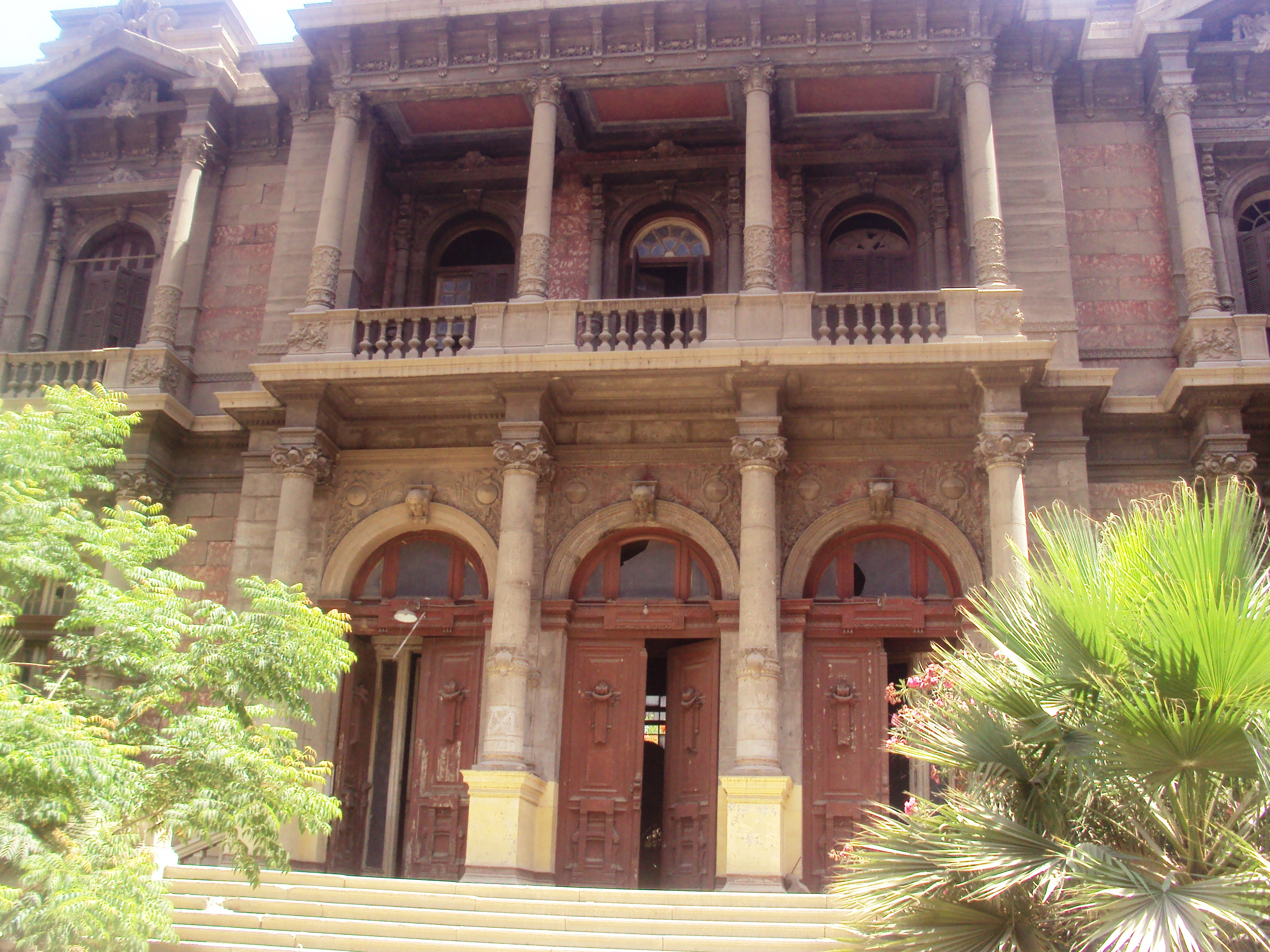
Palace of Prince Said Halim Pasha, 1896–1899, Cairo

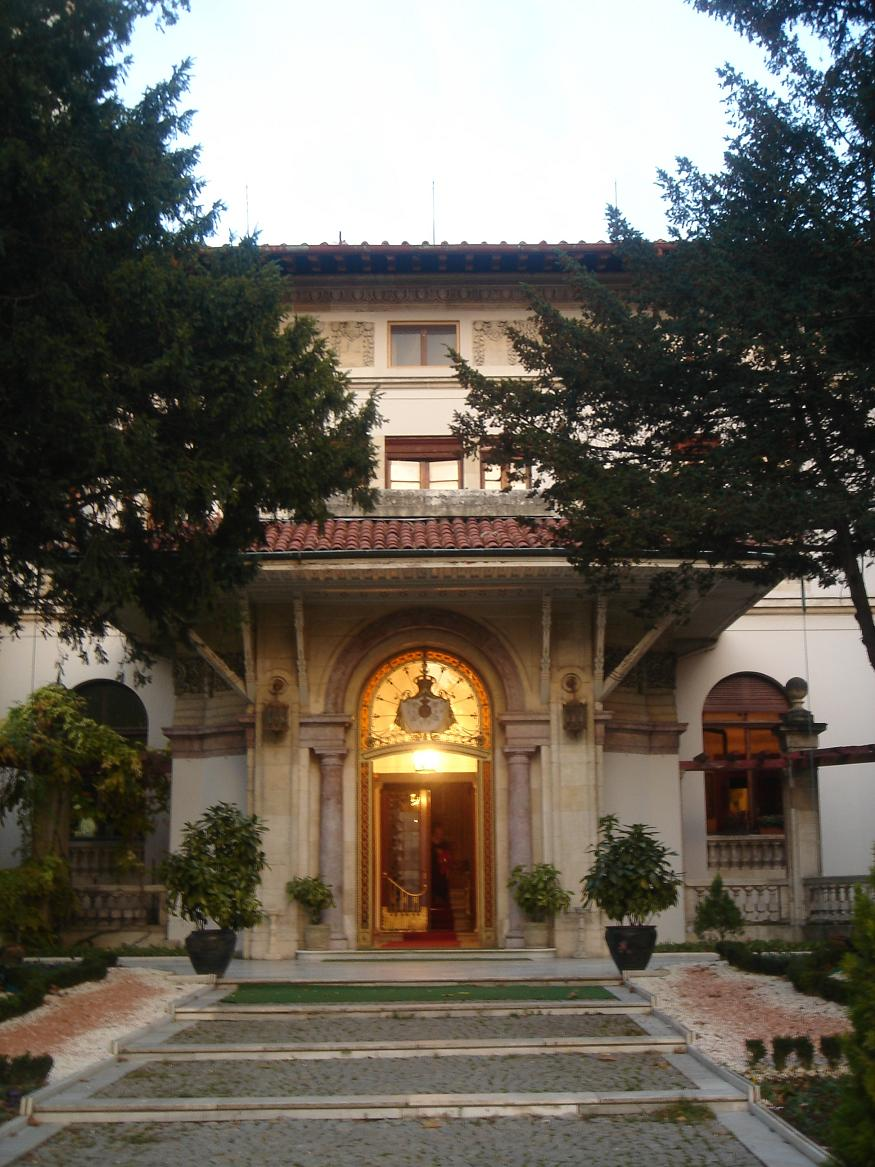
Khedive's Palace, 1907, Istanbul

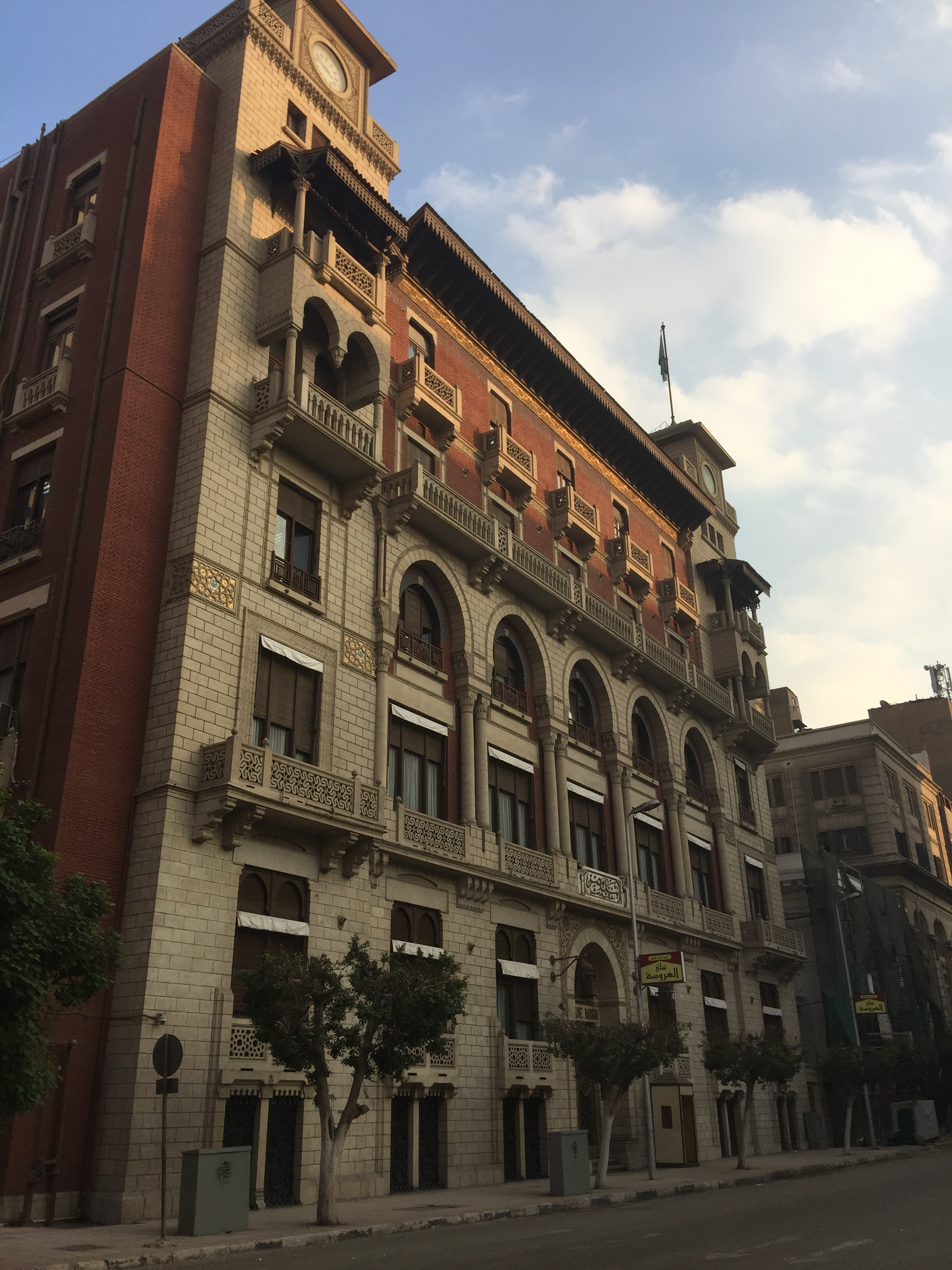
Headquarters of Banque Misr, Cairo, 1927

Lasciac was born to Pietro Laščak and Giuseppina (née Trampuš) in the Italian Gorizia suburb of San Rocco (Slovene: Podturn) in 1856. At the time this was part of the Austrian Empire, today it is in Italy. He was the first of ten children. Three of his siblings died in childhood. He migrated to Gorizia and opened a business with Mihael Trampuš, another Slovene. He fell in love with Trampuš's daughter and took over his crafts workshop after the marriage. Her official Italian name is written as Gioseffa. Her father Mihael was born in Gorizia, to farmers from the surrounding Karst Plateau.

After finishing primary and secondary school in Gorizia, Lasciac studied at the Vienna Polytechnic Institute. While still a student, Lasciac married Maria Luigia Plesnizer (also Marija Alojzija Plesničar) from a Slovene family. Maria bore three children with unusual and fully Italian names: Plautilla Angelina Francesca, Fabrizio Antonio Giuseppe and Romeo Italico Alessandro (died 1926).

He first traveled to Egypt to assist in rebuilding Alexandria after the destruction by the British Bombardment of Alexandria in July 1882. Under the Khedive Abbas II of Egypt, he got a job and title as an Egyptian court architect in 1907. Later he lost this job. During World War I, as national of Austria-Hungary and thus of the enemy he had to leave Egypt. After the war, he returned to Egypt and used to spend the summers in Gorizia and the winters in Egypt. After moving to Cairo on 5 October 1946 he died there on 26 December 1946. He was buried at the Latin Cemetery in Cairo.

Lasciac designed buildings in Gorizia and many Eastern capitals and cities, especially Egypt. The Khedive's Palace in Istanbul and the Tahra Palace in Cairo (1907) are among his most notable works. Of his drawings about a hundred have survived. As of 2015, they were in the private archive of Mercedes Volait in Paris.

== Works (incomplete) ==
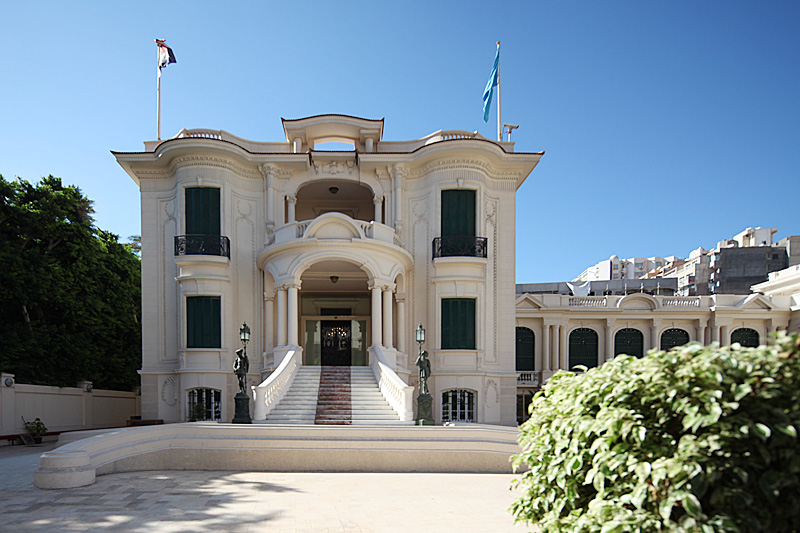
Villa of Princess Fatma Al-Zahra, 1919, Alexandria, today Royal Jewelry Museum

- apartment buildings for the Societé des Immeubles d'Egypte, 1883-1886, rue Cherif, Alexandria
- Menasce Okelle (or Galleria Menasce), 1883–1887, Alexandria
- Ramleh Railway Station, 1887, Alexandria (today replaced)
- Headquarters of the Jewish Community of Alexandria, 1887, Alexandria
- Prince Said Halim Pasha Palace, 1896–1899, Maarouf, Downtown, Cairo (later Nasriya school)
- Suarès Palace (later Risotto Club), 1897, Cairo
- Villa Mazloum Pasha, 1898–1899, Alexandria
- Palace of Prince Kamal Al-Din Hussein And Princess Niemat-Allah, 1906, Cairo
- Aisha Fahmy Palace, 1907, Zamalek, Cairo
- Tahra Palace, 1907, Cairo
- Khedive's Palace, 1907, Istanbul
- Villa Lasciac, 1909, Gorizia
- Khedival Buildings, 1911, Emad Al Din Street, Cairo
- Abdeen Palace, extension, Cairo
- Assicurazioni Generali di Trieste SpA building, 1911, Cairo
- St. Peter and St. Paul's Church, 1911, Cairo
- Alexandria railway station (Egypt) , 1915–1927, Alexandria
- Villa of Princess Fatma Al-Zahra, 1919, Alexandria (today Royal Jewelry Museum)
- Headquarters of Banque Misr, 1927, Cairo

== Honors ==
Asteroid 292459 Antoniolasciac, discovered by astronomers at the Italian Farra d'Isonzo Observatory in 2006, was named in his memory. The official naming citation was published by the Minor Planet Center on 14 November 2016 (M.P.C. 102259).

== Sources cited ==
- Al-Naggar, Abdallah Abdel-Ati (4 July 2021). "Antonio Lasciac and his architectural works in Arabic eyes". Journal of Central and Eastern European African Studies. 1 (1–2) (published 2021): 209–220. ISSN 2786-1902. Wikidata Q110495319.
- Barillari, Diana (1998). "La Villa "egiziana" di Antonio Lasciac sul Rafut: revival islamico nella Mitteleuropa". Borc San Roc (in Italian). 10: 43–57. Wikidata Q110496876.
- Barillari, Diana (January 2001). "Les bâtiments de la compagnie des Assicurazioni Generali au Caire". Le Caire - Alexandrie. Architectures européennes. 1850-1950. Etudes Urbaines (in French) (5) (published 2001): 35–48. ISBN 978-2-7247-0290-3. ISSN 1110-2497. Wikidata Q110496330.
- Khalil, Mohamed Ali Mohamed. The Italian Architecture in Alexandria Egypt (Thesis submitted to University Kore of Enna to obtain Second level master's degree in architecture restoration A.A. 2008–2009)
- Kuzmin, Diego (2015). "From Middle Europe to Egypt: Antonio Lasciac Architect (1856–1946)" (PDF). New Ideas of New Century. 1: 198–208. Wikidata Q110497899. Archived from the original (PDF) on 20 December 2016.
- Kuzmin, Diego (2020). "Biographical notes of Antonio Lasciac". Antonio Lasciac. Un architetto tra Italia, Egitto e Slovenia. Storia, Disegno, Tecnica. Atti della Conferenza Internazionale Gorizia 10–11 dicembre 2014 (in Italian and English): 113–117. Wikidata Q110496907.
- O'Kane, Bernard (20 October 2020). "The Architect Antonio Lasciac (1856–1946) in the Context of Mamluk Revivalisms". Annales islamologiques (54) (published 2020): 299–332. doi:10.4000/anisl.8664. Wikidata Q110495972.
- Scientific Office of the Italian Embassy in Egypt, Scientific Office of the Italian Embassy in Egypt (ed.), Cairo: An Italian Architectural Itinerary (PDF) (in Italian, Arabic, and English), Wikidata Q110495851
