= Javidan Hanim =

Hungarian countess and second spouse of the Khedive Abbas II of Egypt (1877–1968)

- Countess Torok von Szendro
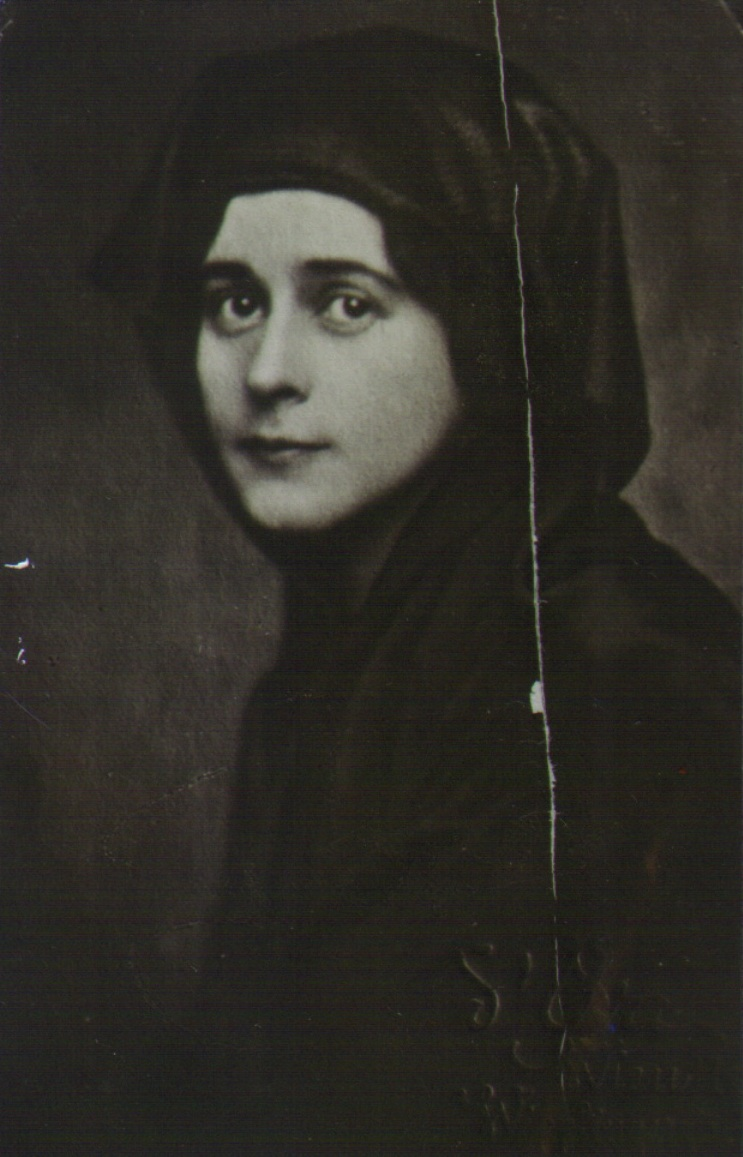
- Javidan Hanim wearing an Islamic veil

Khediva consort of Egypt
- Tenure: 28 February 1910 – 7 August 1913
- Born: June 15, 1877; Philadelphia, Pennsylvania, United States
- Died: August 5, 1968 (aged 91); Graz, Austria
- Burial: Cemetery of St Leonhard, Graz, Austria
- Spouse: Abbas Hilmi II of Egypt (m. 1910; div. 1913)
Names
- Birth name: May Torok von Szendro; Arabic name: Javidan Hanim; Arabic: جاويدان هانم
- House: Alawiyya (by marriage)
- Father: Count József Torok
- Mother: Countess Sofie Vetter von der Lilie
- Religion: Sunni Islam (by conversion)
- Occupation: Pianist; Writer; Interpreter; Painter

Javidan Hanim, also known as Djavidan (Arabic: جاويدان هانم; born May Torok von Szendro; June 15, 1877– August 5, 1968), was a Hungarian noble, and Khediva consort of Egypt from 1910 to 1913 as the second wife of Khedive Abbas II of Egypt.

== Early life ==
Javidan Hanim was born May Torok von Szendro in Philadelphia, Pennsylvania, United States, on 15 June 1877. Her father was Count József Torok von Szendro, former head of Ung county. Her mother was Countess Sofie Vetter von der Lilie, who after their divorce in 1881 married Hungarian inventor Tivadar Puskás, a close collaborator of Thomas Edison in 1882 in Westminster, Middlesex, England. She had an elder brother Count Josef Torok von Szendro (1873 – 98).

She spent most of her youth at Wassen Castle, south of Graz, Austria. At aged 12, she allegedly wrote short articles for various journals and played the piano. At 15, she had her own apartment in Graz. Although she never went to school, her elder brother, following Austrian tradition, was enrolled at the Theresianum, Vienna's famous academy patronized by Habsburg princes and scions of European, Egyptian, Ottoman and Oriental aristocracy. It was there that her brother befriended Prince Abbas Hilmi, an Egyptian prince one year his junior.

== Marriage ==
Javidan first laid eyes on her future husband during one of her infrequent visits to her brother. She met the Egyptian prince twice during that period, when Josef introduced his sister to the prince. A little more than a year before her brother's graduation, Abbas was summoned suddenly to Egypt. A telegram had arrived announcing that Khedive Tewfik had died in his house in Helwan, south of Cairo on 7 January 1892. Egypt's heir apparent, not yet eighteen was expected in Egypt post haste.

Several years passed before Javidan met Abbas again. By that time he was married to his first wife Ikbal Hanim, a father of four and more importantly, Khedive of Egypt. The meeting took place in France in June 1900. She was in Paris visiting her mother and stepfather, and the khedive was passing through on his way to London. The khedive was immediately smitten with her and wasted no time initiating a short but passionate correspondence followed by an invitation for the countess to visit Egypt.

At the port of Alexandria, she was met by Friedrich von Thurneyssen, the khedive's Austrian Master of the Horse. The visit developed into a long romance culminating into a secret marriage contracted in Alexandria's Montaza Palace witnessed by two sheikhs. Their official marriage took place on 28 February 1910, with the Grand Mufti of Egypt officiating. The khedive's affair with her quickly became the subject of gossip within Cairo's foreign community. She remained childless.

She had converted to Islam on 9 February 1910 in the Abdeen Palace in the presence of the Grand Mufti. For some unknown reason or perhaps due to her parents' liberal temperament, she had never been baptized. Her conversion coincided with Abbas Hilmi's visit to Mecca which may account for her adopting a new Muslim name. At first she called herself Zubeida bint Abdallah. That was soon changed to the more courtly Javidan. Since neither sheikh or ulama accepted to tutor a member of the opposite sex, her teacher of the Quran was the famous Swiss Islamist, Hess von Wyss.

== As consort ==
In Cairo, she lived in the khedival domain of Mostorod, north east of the nation's capital. The rest of the time she accompanied the khedive on his travels to Ottoman Empire and Europe as well as inside Egypt. When traveling to and from Egypt she was seldom seen aboard the khedival yacht El Mahrousa. In order to keep the rumourmongers at bay she would use regular passenger liners between Alexandria and Trieste or Constantinople. Most of the time the travel dates coincided with Abbas Hilmi's separate travel arrangements aboard the royal yachts. She took an active role in the creation of Tchibukli Palace which was close to her heart. The architectural and stylistic intent for their residence was to replicate their beloved Alexandrian home Muntaza Palace.

In Egypt, she took part in civic affairs. As a member of the Red Cross she brought solace to victims of the first Balkan War of 1912. By order of the khedive, the wounded, mostly from Kavala near Macedonia, were allowed to recuperate in the Ras El Tin Palace, its halls and long corridors having been transformed into a temporary hospital. The khedival entourage meanwhile stayed at Montaza Palace, his favourite residence. He had personally masterminded its development supervising the construction of its Viennese style salamlik, planning its deepwater harbor and the planting of its pine forests. When at Montaza, she and Abbas Hilmi traveled to Ras El Tin by special train with the khedive personally in control of the small locomotive.

She was fond of Montaza preferring it to her official Cairo residence at Mostorod where the khedive kept a private zoo. It was to Mostorod that Abbas Hilmi dispatched exotic animals, gifts from foreign rulers such as the Sharif of Mecca's two desert greyhounds to which, Bosso, her little black dog, did not take to too kindly.

At Mostorod, she entertained wives of foreign dignitaries with performances on her Bechstein grand piano. Sometimes, with the assistance of an Italian lady painter, she occasionally staged seances. It was during one of these exhilarating events when she discovered she was the reincarnation of a Persian sheikh dead 100 years earlier. A member of her entourage who disapproved of these occult services reported them to the khedive. The seances were abruptly stopped.

Because court protocol discouraged royal consorts from participating in state events, she, with the complicity of her amused husband, would sometimes attend disguised official receptions dressed up as a man. On 8 February 1909, she accompanied the khedive as a young palace official at the laying of the final stone during the heightening of the Aswan Dam. Attending this event was Queen Victoria's son Prince Arthur, Duke of Connaught and Strathearn with whom she toured Luxor.

== Divorce ==
Almost a year before he was deposed in 1914, Abbas Hilmi separated from Javidan. Rumors circulating both in and outside the court claimed the khedive was seeing Georgette Mesny also known as Andrée de Lusange whom he met at Maxim's in Paris the previous summer. The couple had returned to Egypt together aboard the MS Helwan. Lusange was a 20 years old short, lean, heavily painted woman who distributed her favors for 20 francs and once in the khedive's entourage spied for the French government. During his exile, the khedive continued his relationship with Lusange, traveling with her all over Europe and showering her with expensive gifts and jewellery.

On 7 August 1913, she received her divorce papers in Austria. These were signed by the President of the Alexandria Sharia Court, Sheikh Hassan al-Banna. Concurring this document was the Grand Mufti of Egypt Sheikh Bakry Ashour al-Sadfi. Abbas continued to support her financially up to the end.

== Later life ==
Her life after divorce was hard. During World War I she opened a salon in Vienna selling cosmetic articles. She made the acquaintance of composer Eugène d'Albert with whom she perfected her piano. Other acquaintances included Tsar Ferdinand I of Bulgaria, Austrian novelist Robert Musil, Norwegian writer Olaf Gulbransson and German author-playwright Gerhart Hauptmann.

Between the two wars, she made a dash for the motion pictures and theater planks, her latest vocation earning her occasional cover stories, some of which were picked up by the Egyptian press. But with painful disappointment she realised she was two generations too late and no match for younger rivals like Marlene Dietrich or Lucie Mannheim. It was too late for stardom and Josef von Sternberg would not cast her as Lola in his 1930 production The Blue Angel. In 1931, she published her memoirs under the name Harem Life of Princess Djavidan Hanum.

Re-settled at No. 49 Schlueterstr Berlin-Charlottenburg, she gave piano concerts, wrote short plays for the radio and authored several works including Back to Paradise, The Great Seven, Soul And Body and Gulzar. During World War II, she took refuge in Vienna and immediately after the Germans surrendered, moved to Innsbruck where she worked as an interpreter for the French Military Government in July 1945. When the former khedive died in Geneva in December 1944, which coincided with the 30th anniversary of his overthrow, her pension was discontinued. Postwar times were hard and by 1950 she was financially broke. Desperate for money she succumbed to the machinations of devious press agents on the make. She then went to Paris.

Refusing to leave enticing spotlights, Javidan made it back to the media once more, this time as a supplicant for an entry visa to the United Kingdom. Her motive was a visa enabling her to travel to London to take a screen test for the film Queen For A Day produced by Alfred Golding of Eureka Holdings. She then settled down in Graz, nicknamed Pensionopolis for its high incidence of retirees. In her twilight years she took to painting and shortly before passing way, exhibited her latest art works entitled Visions On The Nile.

== Death ==
Javidan died in Graz on 5 August 1968, aged 91. She was buried at the cemetery of St. Leonhard with only a few Muslim students from the nearby university in attendance, with only the words "Djanan Djavidan" on the gravestone.

== Ancestry ==
Ancestors of Javidan Hanim

8. Count József Török de Szendrő
4. Count Johann Nepomuk Török de Szendrő
9. Baroness Mária Vécsey von Hajnacskeö
2. Count József Török de Szendrő
5. Countess Paulina Sztáray
1. Javidan Hanim
12. Count Ferdinánd Vetter von der Lilie
6. Count Ferdinand Vetter von der Lilie
13. Zsófia von Dernath
3. Countess Sofie Vetter von der Lilie
14. Jozef von Wachtler auf Wsetin
7. Josephine von Wachtler auf Wsetin
15. Sidonia Scharf

== See also ==
- List of consorts of the Muhammad Ali Dynasty

Egyptian royalty
| Preceded by Ikbal Hanim | Khediva consort of Egypt; 28 February 1910 – 7 August 1913 | Vacant Title next held by Melek Tourhan as Sultana consort |
