= Tahra Palace =

Coordinates: 30.098235°N 31.308509°E

Al-Tahra Palace is a palace located in the Hadaek al-Qubbah district in Cairo, Egypt. It was built in 1927 and designed by Antonio Lasciac. It was mainly built for Princess Amina, daughter of Khedive Ismail and mother of Mohamed Taher Pasha. It was built in "Italianate Palazzo" style. In 1939 King Farouk bought the palace. In 1953 the state confiscated the palace and it was used as a presidential guesthouse.
