= El Qobbah =

Cairo district

Coordinates: 30°05′48″N 31°18′37″E

Hadaek al-Qubbah (Qubbah Gardens, Arabic: حدائق القبة) is a district in the Northern Area of Cairo, Egypt.

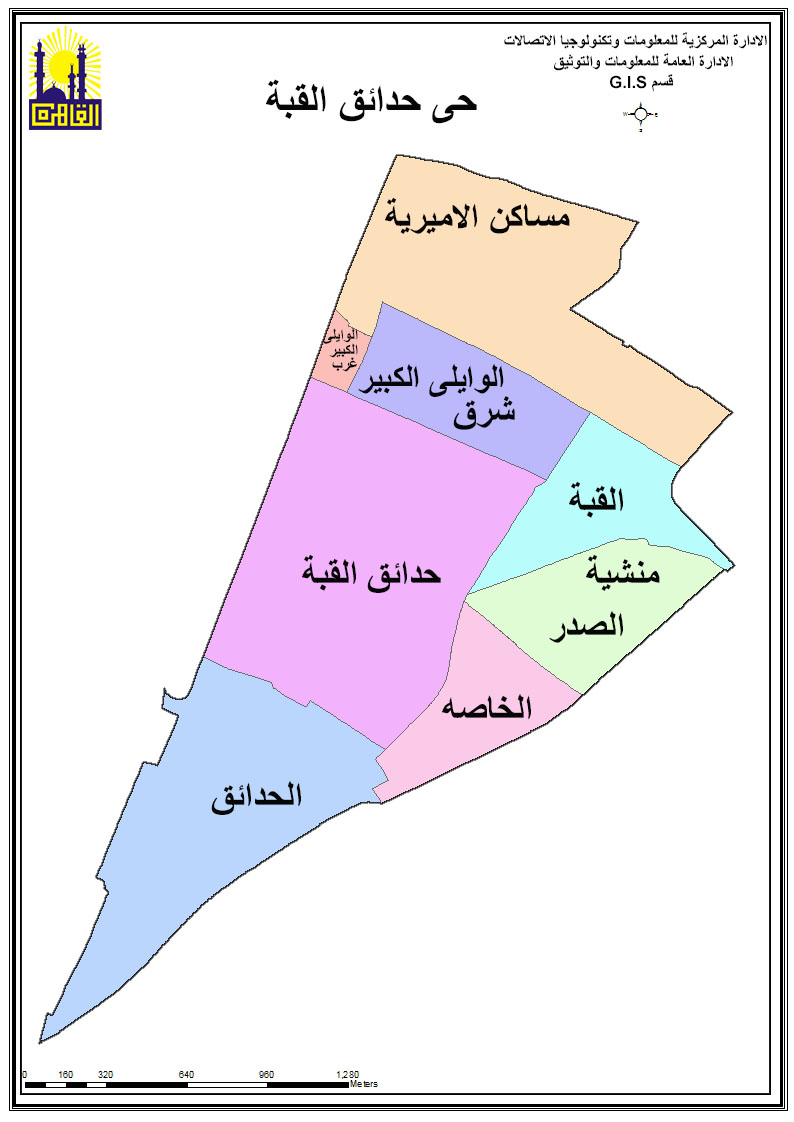

== History ==
It used to be a palatial garden district in the 19th century as was Shubra before it. The Qubbah Palace was built in the mid 19th century by a royal and bought in 1866 by Khedive Ismail as a suburban retreat from his official residence, Abdeen Palace, in central Cairo.

In the early 20th century, a daughter of the khedive built the Tahra Palace nearby. At the same time, Cairo was witnessing a real estate boom with the planning of a number of residential suburbs including Zamalek, Maadi and Heliopolis and in 1906, the Koubbeh Gardens Building Land Company bought 96 acres between Abbasiya and the palaces to develop.

The district was once an affluent neighborhood with enormous mansions covering the area. Today, high blocks cover the once richly-gardened district.
