= Margaret Murray Cookesley =

British painter (1844–1927)

- Born: Margaret Deborah Cookesley; 1844
- Died: 1927 (aged 82–83)
- Awards: Order of Charity

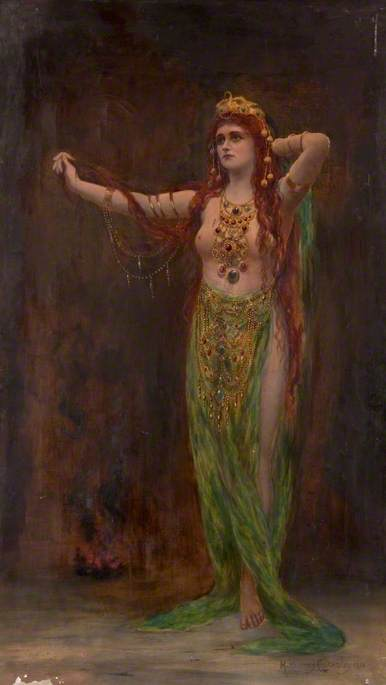
Circe resplendens (1913)

Margaret Murray Cookesley or Murray-Cookesley (1844–1927), born Margaret Deborah Cookesley, took the name Murray upon marriage, and was an English painter. She traveled to the Middle East and painted oriental scenes in oils and water colours. She exhibited at the Royal Academy and the Society of Women Artists.

== Life and career ==
As reported by Clara Erskine Clement, Cookesley visited Constantinople where the sultan commissioned a portrait of his son; he was so pleased with this that he asked her to paint his wives as well, but she did not have time for this commission. She was awarded the Order of the Chefakat and the Medaille des Beaux-Arts in the Ottoman Empire.

Her Circe resplendens (1913) is in the collection of Glasgow Museums.

== Work ==
Some of her paintings are held in collections, including the Victoria Art Gallery, Bath (Frederick Harrison, Author); Towneley Hall, Burnley (The Gambler's Wife); the Walker Art Gallery, Liverpool (Cleopatra); and the Graves Art Gallery, Sheffield (The Egg Seller); and Cartwright Hall, Bradford (Rich and rare were the gems she wore). However, Cookesley's work is poorly represented in art museums. Yet, her paintings regularly appear in the catalogues of leading auction houses such as Sotheby's and Christie's. Scholar, Julia Kuehn, has explained this by pointing out that Cookesley's work was intended for a mass market rather than as a form of high art. Thus, her paintings entered private collections where they continue to be traded among collectors. She painted numerous harem scenes.

=== Selected works ===
- Consulting the Oracle, After Waterhouse undated
- Contemplation, 1895
- Smoking the Pipe, 1893
- Entertainment in the Harem, 1894
- Idle Moments, 1894
- Handmaidens, undated
- Peaceful Thoughts, 1899
