= Abbas II of Egypt =

Khedive of Egypt and Sudan from 1892 to 1914

Abbas Hilmi II عباس حلمي باشا
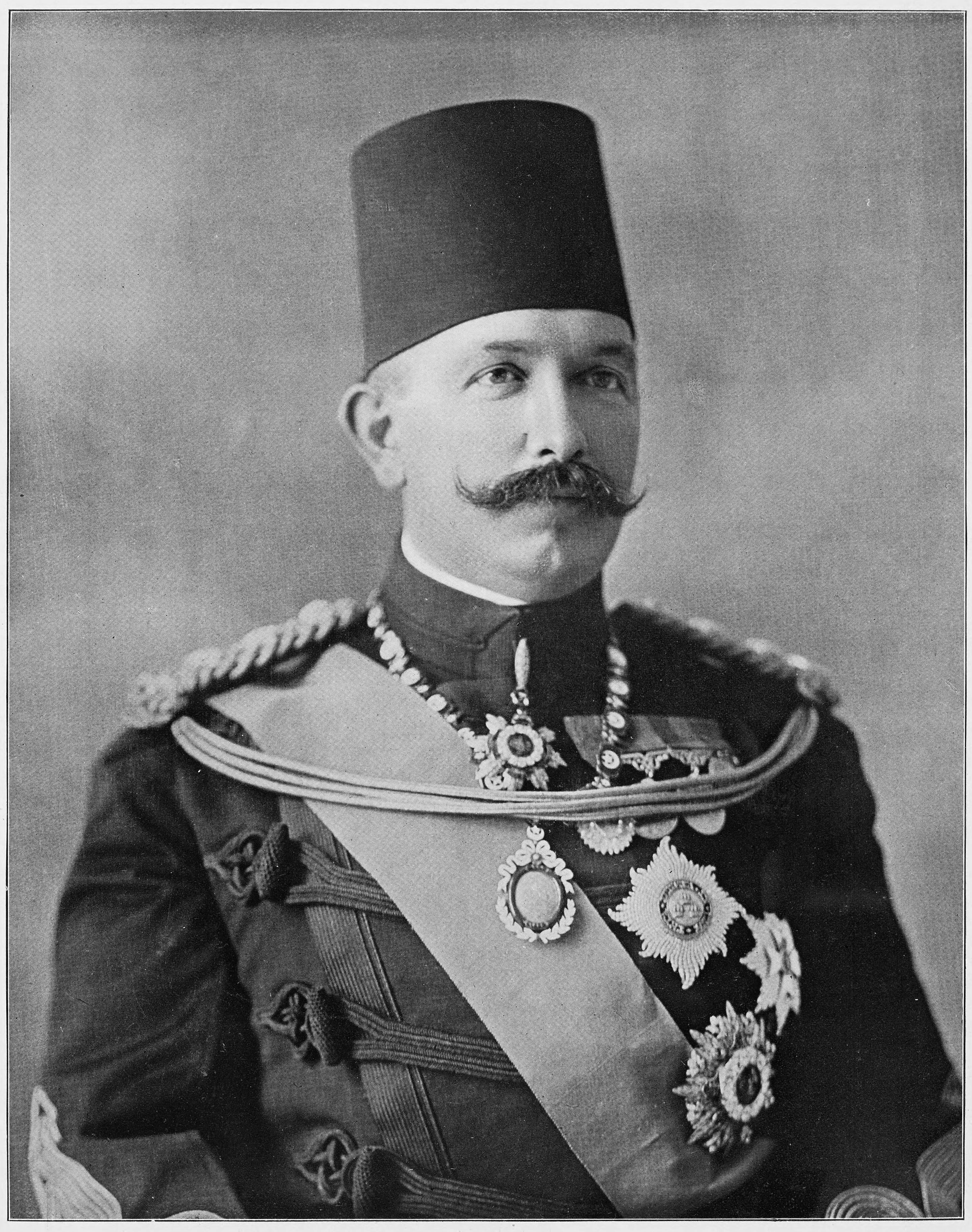
- Abbas Hilmi II in 1909

Khedive of Egypt and Sudan
- Reign: 8 January 1892 – 19(20)(21) December 1914
- Predecessor: Tewfik I
- Successor: Hussein Kamel (as Sultan of Egypt)
- Born: 14 July 1874; Alexandria, Khedivate of Egypt
- Died: 19 December 1944 (aged 70); Geneva, Switzerland
- Burial: Qubbat Afandina, Cairo, Egypt
- Spouse: Ikbal Hanim (m. 1895; div. 1910) Javidan Hanim (m. 1910; div. 1913)
- Issue: Princess Emine Hilmi; Princess Atiye Hilmi; Princess Fethiye Hilmi; Prince Muhammad Abdel Moneim; Princess Lutfiya Shavkat; Prince Muhammed Abdel Kader
- House: Alawiyya
- Father: Tewfik I of Egypt
- Mother: Emina of Ilhamy
- Religion: Sunni Islam

Abbas Helmy II (also known as ʿAbbās Ḥilmī Pāshā, Arabic: عباس حلمي باشا; 14 July 1874 – 19 December 1944) was the last Khedive of Egypt and the Sudan, ruling from 8 January 1892 to 19 December 1914. (Note: Sources give different dates for the deposition of Abbas. Some state that date as 20 or 21 December 1914.) In 1914, after the Ottoman Empire joined the Central Powers in World War I, the nationalist Khedive was removed by the British, then ruling Egypt, in favour of his more pro-British uncle, Hussein Kamel. As the latter became Sultan of Egypt, the deposition of Abbas II marked the de jure end of the nearly four-century long era of Ottoman Egypt, which had started with Ottoman conquest in 1517.

== Early life ==
Abbas II (full name: Abbas Hilmy), the great-great-grandson of Muhammad Ali, was born in Alexandria, Egypt on 14 July 1874. In 1887 he was ceremonially circumcised together with his younger brother Mohammed Ali Tewfik. The festivities lasted for three weeks and were carried out with great pomp. As a boy he visited the United Kingdom, and he had a number of British tutors in Cairo including a governess who taught him English. In a profile of Abbas II, the boys' annual, Chums, gave a lengthy account of his education. His father established a small school near the Abdin Palace in Cairo where European, Arab and Ottoman masters taught Abbas and his brother Mohammed Ali Tewfik. An American officer in the Egyptian army took charge of his military training. He attended school at Lausanne, Switzerland; then, at the age of twelve, he was sent to the Haxius School in Geneva, in preparation for his entry into the Theresianum in Vienna. In addition to Arabic and Ottoman Turkish, he had good conversational knowledge of English, French and German.

== Reign ==
Abbas II succeeded his father, Tewfik Pasha, as Khedive of Egypt and Sudan on 8 January 1892. He was still in college in Vienna when he assumed the throne of the Khedivate of Egypt upon the sudden death of his father. He was barely of age according to Egyptian law; normally eighteen in cases of succession to the throne. For some time he did not willingly cooperate with the British, whose army had occupied Egypt in 1882. As he was young and eager to exercise his new power, he resented the interference of the British Agent and Consul General in Cairo, Sir Evelyn Baring, who on 20 June 1892 was created the Lord Cromer. Cromer initially supported Abbas, but the new Khedive's nationalist agenda and association with the anti-colonial nationalist movements in Egypt put him in direct conflict with British colonial officers, and Cromer later interceded on behalf of Lord Kitchener (British commander in the Sudan) in an ongoing dispute with Abbas about Egyptian sovereignty and influence in that territory.

At the outset of his reign, Khedive Abbas II surrounded himself with a coterie of European advisers who opposed the British occupation of Egypt and Sudan and encouraged the young khedive to challenge Cromer by replacing his ailing prime minister with an Egyptian nationalist. At Cromer's behest, Lord Rosebery, the British Foreign Secretary, sent Abbas II a letter stating that the Khedive was obliged to consult the British consul on such issues as cabinet appointments. In January 1894 Abbas II made an inspection tour of Sudanese and Egyptian frontier troops stationed near the southern border, the Mahdists being at the time still in control of the Sudan. At Wadi Halfa the Khedive made public remarks disparaging the Egyptian army units commanded by British officers. The British Sirdar of the Egyptian Army, the then Sir Herbert H. Kitchener, immediately threatened to resign. Kitchener further insisted on the dismissal of a nationalist under-secretary of war appointed by Abbas II and that an apology be made for the Khedive's criticism of the army and its officers.

By 1899 he had come to accept British counsels. Also in 1899, British diplomat Alfred Mitchell-Innes was appointed Under-Secretary of State for Finance in Egypt, and in 1900 Abbas II paid a second visit to Britain, during which he said he thought the British had done good work in Egypt, and declared himself ready to cooperate with the British officials administering Egypt and Sudan. He gave his formal approval for the establishment of a sound system of justice for Egyptian nationals, a significant reduction in taxation, increased affordable and sound education, the inauguration of the substantial irrigation works such as the Aswan Low Dam and the Assiut Barrage, and the reconquest of Sudan. He displayed more interest in agriculture than in statecraft. His farm of cattle and horses at Qubbah, near Cairo, was a model for agricultural science in Egypt, and he created a similar establishment at Muntazah, just east of Alexandria. He married the Princess Ikbal Hanem and had several children. Muhammad Abdul Moneim, the heir-apparent, was born on 20 February 1899.

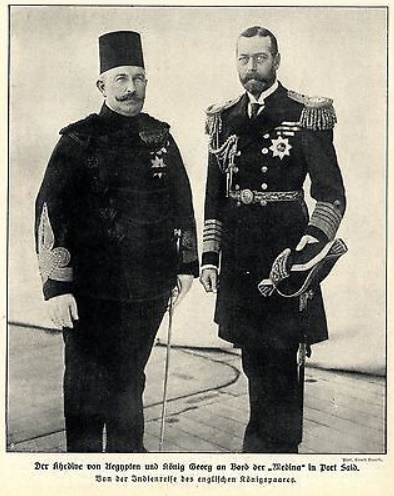
Abbas II with King George V in 1911

Although Abbas II no longer publicly opposed the British, he secretly created, supported and sustained the Egyptian nationalist movement, which came to be led by Mustafa Kamil Pasha. He also funded the anti-British newspaper Al-Mu'ayyad. As Kamil's thrust was increasingly aimed at winning popular support for a nationalist political party, Khedive Abbas publicly distanced himself from the Nationalists and was labeled as being against Islam by said nationalists. The western world would characterize him as a revolutionary against peace, although his main goal was to gain independence for Egypt. Their demand for a constitutional government in 1906 was rebuffed by Abbas II, and the following year he formed the National Party, led by Mustafa Kamil Pasha, to counter the Ummah Party of the Egyptian moderates. However, in general, he had no real political power. When the Egyptian Army was sent to fight Abd al-Rahman al-Mahdi in Mahdist Sudan in 1896, he only found out about it because the Austro-Hungarian Archduke Francis Ferdinand was in Egypt and told him after being informed of it by a British Army officer.

His relations with Cromer's successor, Sir Eldon Gorst, however, were excellent, and they co-operated in appointing the cabinets headed by Butrus Ghali in 1908 and Muhammad Sa'id in 1910 and in checking the power of the National Party. The appointment of Kitchener to succeed Gorst in 1912 displeased Abbas II, and relations between the Khedive and the British deteriorated. Kitchener, who exiled or imprisoned the leaders of the National Party, often complained about "that wicked little Khedive" and wanted to depose him.

On 25 July 1914, at the onset of World War I, Abbas II was in Constantinople and was wounded in his hands and cheeks during a failed assassination attempt. On 5 November 1914 when Great Britain declared war on the Ottoman Empire, he was accused of deserting Egypt by not promptly returning home. The British also believed that he was plotting against their rule, as he had attempted to appeal to Egyptians and Sudanese to support the Central Powers against the British. So when the Ottoman Empire joined the Central Powers in World War I, the United Kingdom declared Egypt a Sultanate under British protection on 18 December 1914 and deposed Abbas II.

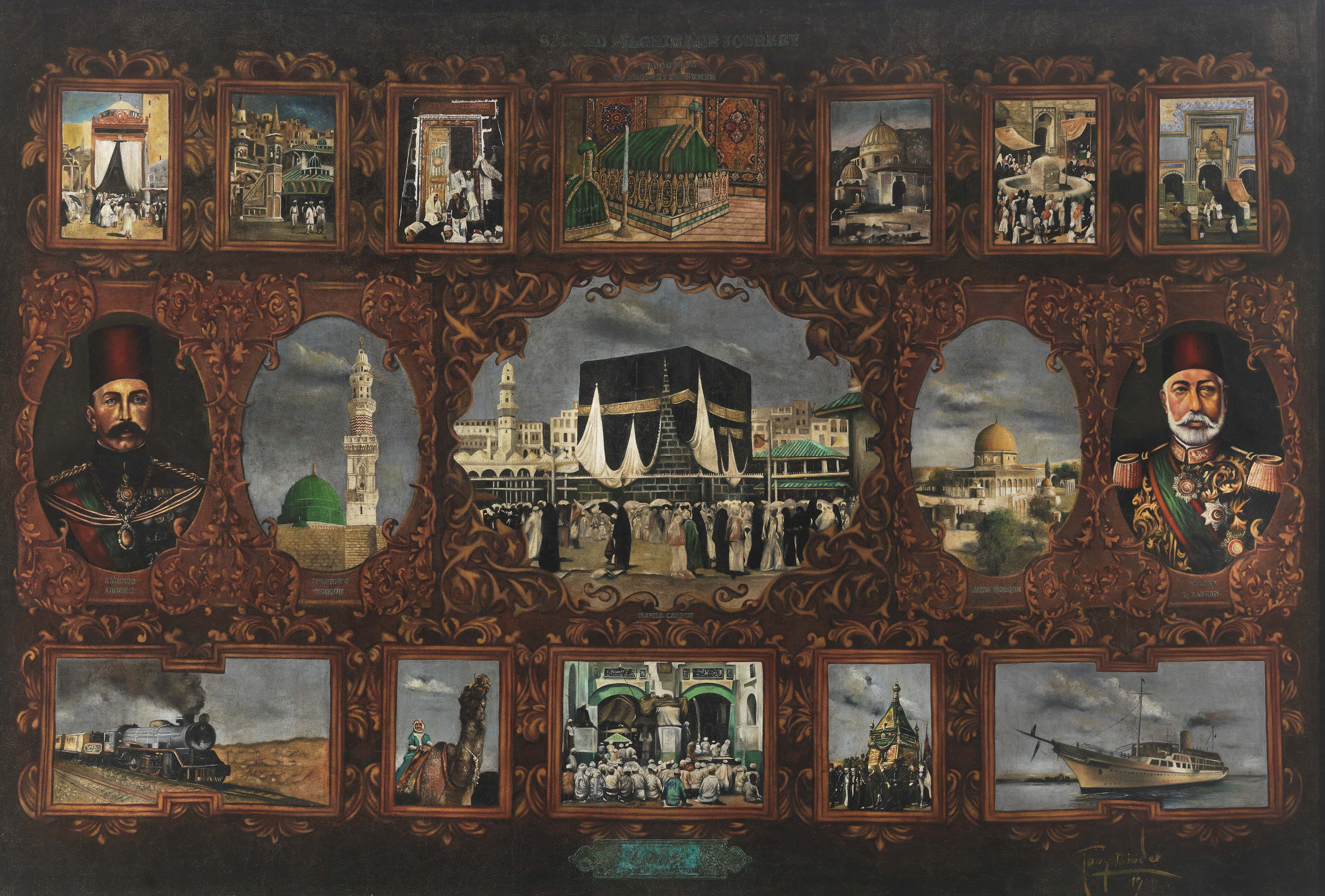
Painting commemorating Abbas II's 1909 Hajj pilgrimage, including his portrait on the left

== Later Life ==
During the war, Abbas II sought support from the Ottomans, including proposing to lead an attack on the Suez Canal. He was replaced by the British by his uncle Hussein Kamel from 1914 to 1917, with the title of Sultan of Egypt. Hussein Kamel issued a series of restrictive orders to strip Abbas II of property in Egypt and Sudan and forbade contributions to him. These also barred Abbas from entering Egyptian territory and stripped him of the right to sue in Egyptian courts. This did not prevent his progeny, however, from exercising their rights. Abbas II finally accepted the new order on 12 May 1931 and formally abdicated. He retired to Switzerland, where he wrote The Anglo-Egyptian Settlement (1930). He died at Geneva on 19 December 1944, aged 70, 30 years to the day after the end of his reign as Khedive.

== Marriages and issue ==
His first marriage in Cairo on 19 February 1895 was to Ikbal Hanim (Constantinople, Ottoman Empire, 22 October 1876 – Istanbul, 10 February 1941). They divorced in 1910 and had six children, two sons and four daughters:

- Princess Emina (Montaza Palace, Alexandria, 12 February 1895 – 1954), unmarried and without issue, received decoration of the Order of Charity, 1st class, 31 May 1895;
- Princess Atiyatullah (Cairo, 9 June 1896 – 1971), married twice and had issue, three sons, received decoration of the Order of Charity, 1st class, 1 October 1904;
- Princess Fathiya (27 November 1897 – 30 November 1923), married without issue, received decoration of the Order of Charity, 1st class, 1 October 1904;
- Prince Prince Muhammad Abdel Moneim, Heir Apparent and Regent of Egypt and Sudan, (20 February 1899 – 1 December 1979), married and had issue, a son and a daughter;
- Princess Lutfiya Shavkat (Cairo, 29 September 1900 – 1975), married and had issue, two daughters, received decoration of the Order of Charity, 1st class, 20 July 1907;
- Prince Muhammad Abdul Kadir (4 February 1902 – Montreux, 21 April 1919);

His second marriage in Çubuklu, Turkey on 28 February 1910 was to Hungarian noblewoman Javidan Hanim (born May Torok de Szendro, Philadelphia, Pennsylvania, U.S., 8 January 1874 – 5 August 1968). They divorced in 1913 without issue.

== Honours ==
Ribbon bar	Country	Honour	Date	Notes
	Sweden	Commander Grand Cross of the Order of the Polar Star	1890	
	Austria-Hungary	Grand Cross of the Order of Franz Joseph	1891	
	United Kingdom of Great Britain and Ireland	Honorary Knight Grand Cross of the Most Distinguished Order of Saint Michael and Saint George	23 July 1891	
	France	Grand Cross of the Légion d'honneur	1892	
	Denmark	Knight Grand Cross of the Order of the Dannebrog	6 April 1892	
	United Kingdom	Honorary Knight Grand Cross (Civil) of the Most Honourable Order of the Bath	10 June 1892	
	Spain	Grand Cross of the Order of Charles III	4 August 1892	
	Netherlands	Knight Grand Cross of the Order of the Netherlands Lion	1892	
	Ottoman Empire	1st Class of the Order of the Medjidie	1895	
	Ottoman Empire	1st Class of the Order of Osmanieh	1895	
	Austria-Hungary	Grand Cross of the Order of Leopold	1897	
	Siam	Knight Grand Cross (Special Class) of the Most Illustrious Order of Chula Chom Klao	1897	
	United Kingdom	Honorary Knight Grand Cross of the Royal Victorian Order	28 June 1900	
	Russia	Knight of the Order of Saint Alexander Nevsky	1902	
	Hesse	Grand Cross of the Order of Ludwig	26 March 1903	
	United Kingdom	Recipient of the Royal Victorian Chain	15 June 1905	
	Oldenburg	Grand Cross of the House and Merit Order of Peter Frederick Louis	1905	
	Saxe-Coburg and Gotha	Grand Cross of the Saxe-Ernestine House Order	1905	(Note: These three duchies were small independent free states that became part of the German Empire before World War I.)
	Saxony	Grand Cross of the Order of Albert	1905	
	Greece	Grand Cross of the Order of the Redeemer	1905	
	Montenegro	Knight Grand Cross of the Order of Prince Danilo I	1905	
	Romania	Grand Cross of the Order of Carol I	1905	
	Vatican	Knight Grand Cross of the Order of Pius IX	1905	
	Austria-Hungary	Grand Cross of the Order of Saint Stephen	1905	
	Russia	Knight 1st Class of the Order of Saint Stanislaus	1908	
	Siam	Knight of the Most Auspicious Order of the Royal House of Chakri	1908	
	Italy	Knight Grand Cross of the Order of Saints Maurice and Lazarus	1911	
	Belgium	Grand Cordon of the Order of Leopold	1911	
	Ethiopia	Grand Cross of the Order of the Star of Ethiopia	1911	
	Morocco	Grand Cross of the Order of Ouissam Alaouite	1913	
	Albania	Grand Cross of the Order of the Black Eagle	1914	
	Prussia	Grand Cross with Collar of the Order of the Red Eagle	1914	
	Zanzibar	Grand Cordon of the Order of the Exalted	1914	

== Footnotes ==
Abbas II of Egypt Muhammad Ali Dynasty Born: 14 July 1874 Died: 19 December 1944
Regnal titles
Preceded by Tewfik Pasha	Khedive of Egypt and Sudan; 7 January 1892 – 19 December 1914	Vacant World War I Title next held by Hussein Kamel as Sultan of Egypt and Sudan
