= Order of Charity =

Order of Charity نشانِ شفقت
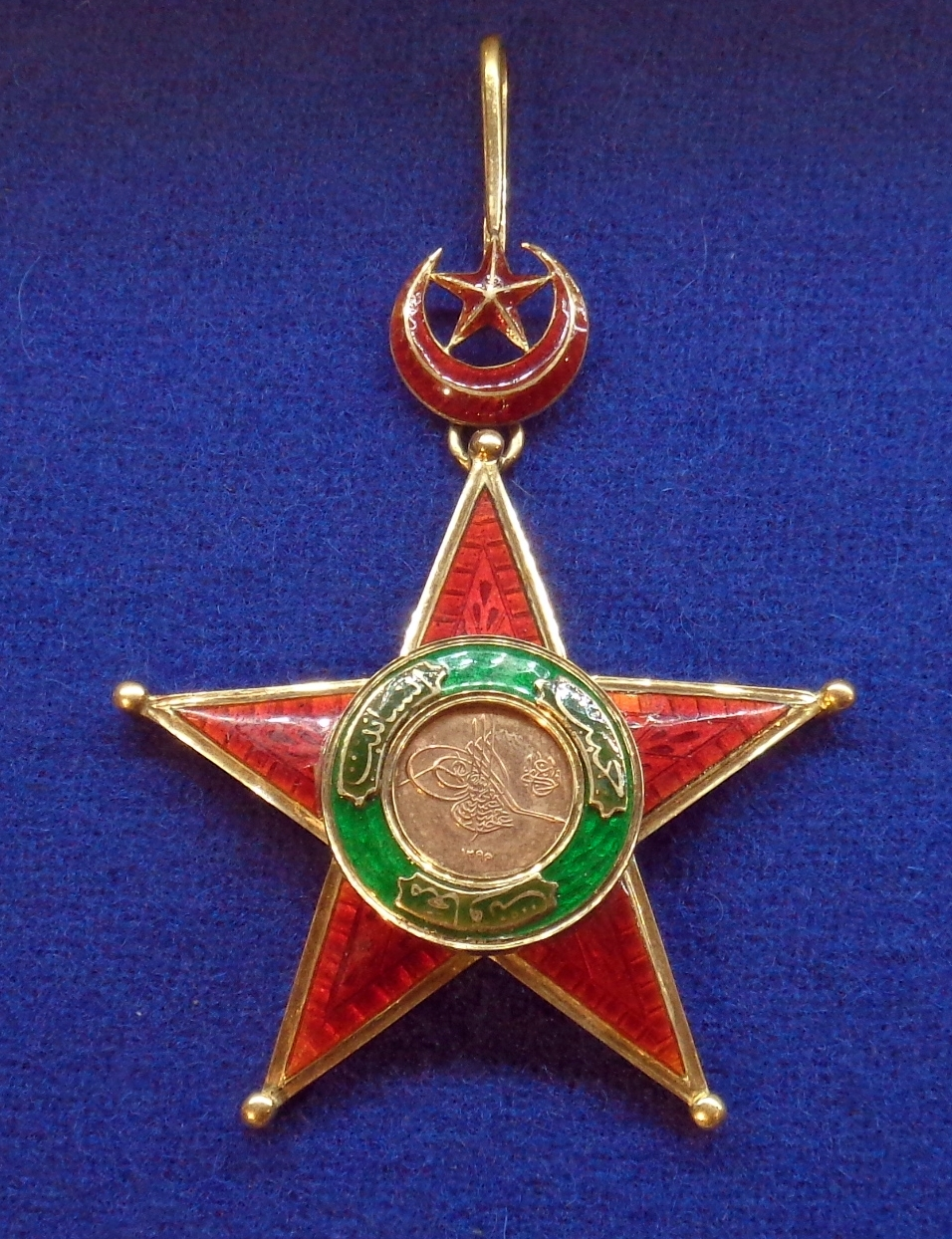
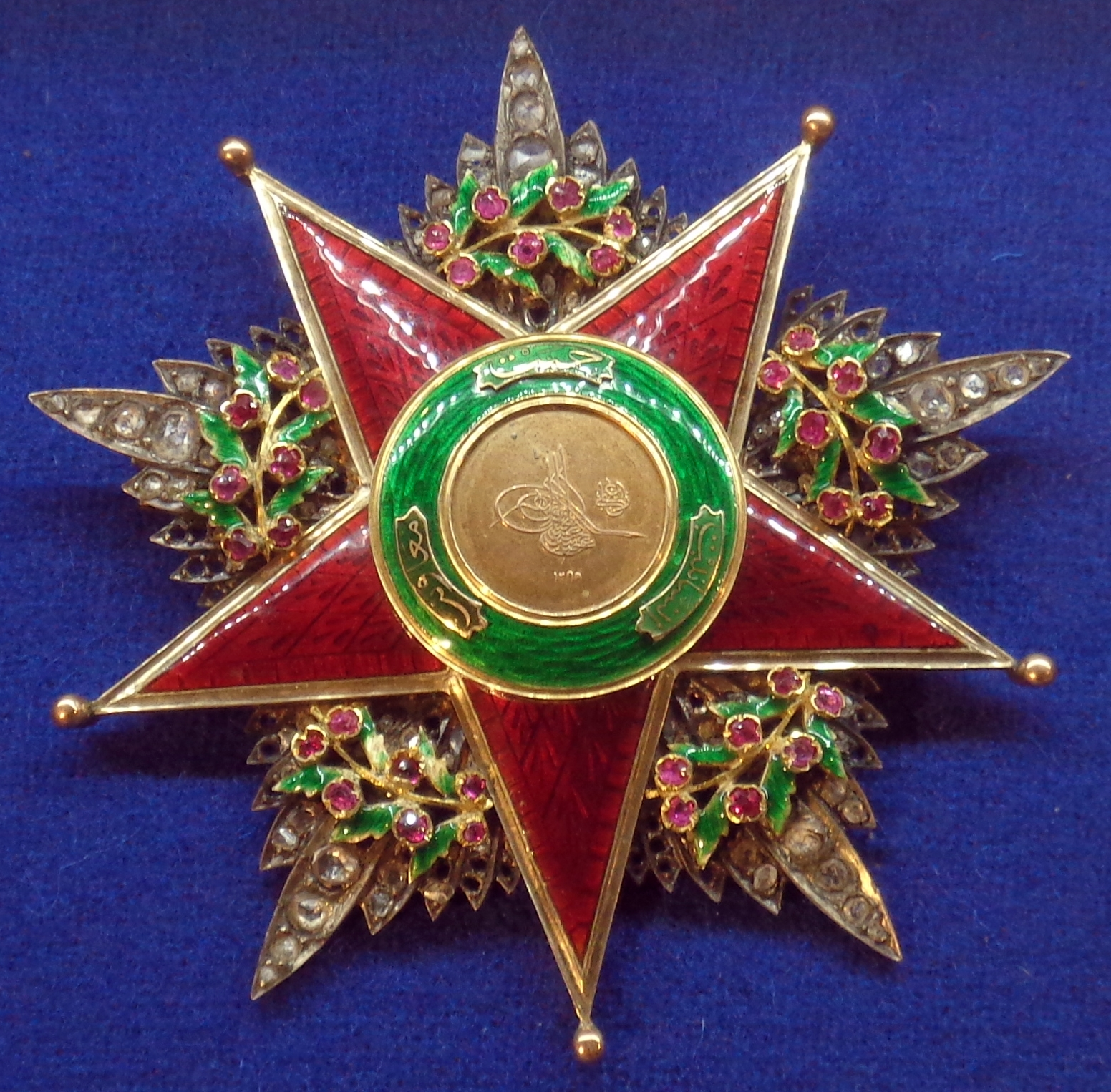
- Badge and star of the order
- Type: Order of Merit
- Awarded for: Charitable work
- Country: Ottoman Empire
- Presented by: Ottoman Sultan
- Status: No longer awarded
- Established: 1878
- Ribbon of the order

The Order of Charity (Ottoman Turkish: نشانِ شفقت), sometimes referred to as the Order of the Chefakat, was an order of the Ottoman Empire founded in 1878 by Sultan Abdul Hamid II.

It was bestowed on selected women for distinguished humanitarian or charitable works, or as a token of the Sultan's esteem. Recipients included non-Ottoman citizens, including the English painter Margaret Murray Cookesley for her portrait of the Sultan's son, Hariot Hamilton-Temple-Blackwood (1883), wife of the Earl of Dufferin who was British ambassador to the Ottoman Empire, and to American social reformer Ellen Martin Henrotin (1893).

The badge consists of a five pointed star in gold and crimson enamel, with a central gold medallion bearing the Sultan's cypher, surrounded by a green enamelled band with the words "Humanity, Assistance, Patriotism" in Ottoman Turkish. The star rests upon a circular wreath enamelled green with crimson berries, the whole mounted on another star with radiant points. The decoration is hung from a star and crescent suspension, enamelled red. The order had three classes, with the highest class mounted with diamonds and other precious stones.

== Recipients ==
- Princess Ingeborg of Denmark
- Alexandra of Denmark
- Alexandra Feodorovna
- Margaret Murray Cookesley
- Princess Elisabeth Sybille of Saxe-Weimar-Eisenach
- Helen Morgenthau Fox
- Hariot Hamilton-Temple-Blackwood, Marchioness of Dufferin and Ava
- Ellen Martin Henrotin
- Maria Christina of Austria
- Archduchess Maria Theresa of Austria
- Princess Victoria Louise of Prussia
- Wilhelmina of the Netherlands
- Zita of Bourbon-Parma
- Milena of Montenegro
- Crown Princess Militza of Montenegro, born Duchess of Mecklenburg-Strelitz
