= Frederick Corbett =

Recipient of the Victoria Cross

Frederick Corbett VC
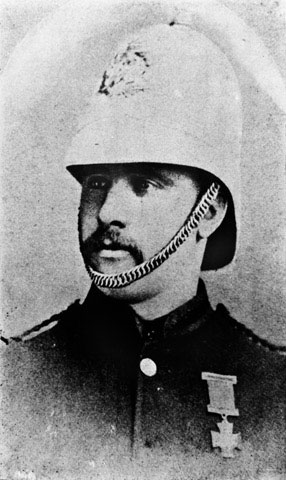
- Born: David Embleton; 17 September 1853; Maldon, Essex, England
- Died: 25 September 1912 (aged 59); Maldon Union Workhouse, Maldon
- Military career
- Allegiance: United Kingdom
- Branch: British Army
- Service years: 1873–91
- Rank: Private
- Units: King's Royal Rifle Corps (1873–83); Royal Artillery (1884–91)
- Conflicts: 1882 Anglo-Egyptian War
- Awards: Victoria Cross (forfeited) Egypt Medal (1882–89); 1 clasp: "Tel el Kebir" (for action on 11 September 1882) Khedive's Star (1882) (Egypt)

Frederick Corbett VC (17 September 1853 – 25 September 1912) was an English recipient of the Victoria Cross, the highest award for gallantry in the face of the enemy that can be awarded to British and Commonwealth forces. Corbett was born on 17 September 1853 in Maldon, Essex, and died there in 1912. His name at birth was David Embleton. He served in first the King's Royal Rifle Corps (1873–83) and second, the Royal Artillery (1884–91).

== Military service ==
Corbett served in the British Army between 1873 and 1891.

Corbett was 28 years old and a private in the 3rd Battalion, King's Royal Rifle Corps in Egypt when discontented Egyptian officers under Ahmed ‘Urabi rebelled against the administration of Khedive Tewfik, which was influenced by the British and French governments. In the ensuing unrest, the United Kingdom acted to protect its interests in the country, notably the Suez Canal. It was during this service that the following deed took place for which he was awarded the Victoria Cross:

The citation in The London Gazette of 16 February 1883, read

During the reconnaissance upon Kafr Dowar, Egypt, on 5 August 1882, the Mounted Infantry, with which Private Corbett was serving, came under a hot fire from the enemy and suffered some loss, including Lieutenant Howard Vyse, mortally wounded. This officer fell in the open, and there being then no time to move him, Private Corbett asked and obtained permission to remain by him, and though under a constant fire, he sat down and endeavoured to stop the bleeding of this officer's wounds, until the Mounted Infantry received orders to retire, when he rendered valuable assistance in carrying him off the field.

The event occurred during a probing attack on the Egyptian position. He also served at the decisive Battle of Tel el-Kebir on 13 September 1882. Subsequently, when Kafr-el-Dawwar surrendered following the British victory in Egypt, the works there were found to be strong and well-stocked with modern artillery and arms and ammunition. Held by determined defenders, they would have been extremely difficult to take.

== VC forfeiture ==
The Army Discipline and Regulation Act of 1879 (Army Act) required active soldiers to display their medals on their uniforms on specific occasions. After leaving the army, Corbett sold the medal. He re-enlisted, this time into the Royal Artillery, in 1884. On 30 July 1884, after being convicted of being absent without leave and for embezzlement and theft from an officer in a court-martial, Corbett's name was erased from the VC Register by royal warrant and his VC pension was terminated.

Corbett was among eight recipients of the VC whose awards were withdrawn for later criminal offences between 1856 and 1908. The original royal warrant for the Victoria Cross involved an expulsion clause that allowed for a recipient's name to be erased from the official register in certain wholly discreditable circumstances and his pension cancelled. The power to cancel and restore awards is still included in the warrant, but none has been forfeited since 1908. King George V felt that no VC should ever be forfeited, regardless of crime. Corbett and the seven others whose awards were forfeited "continue to be included on the official War Office list of VC holders".

By 1903 the Corbett VC had come into the possession of a Mr Mansfield, Clerk of Kingsbury Urban District Council, who approached the War Office (WO) apparently with the intention of returning the actual medal to Frederick Corbett, or to his family. The War Office informed Mansfield that, "as the name of Frederick Corbett had been erased from the VCR, the cross should not be delivered to Corbett or his representatives." Worried as to whether he could retain the medal, Mr Mansfield sought clarification; a further letter from the WO confirmed that, "in view of Corbett having sold his VC at a time when he was not subject to the Army Act, Mr Mansfield was entitled to retain it." Corbett's Victoria Cross was sold at auction by Glendining's on 17 June 1924 for £50 and now resides in the Royal Green Jackets (Rifles) Museum in Winchester.

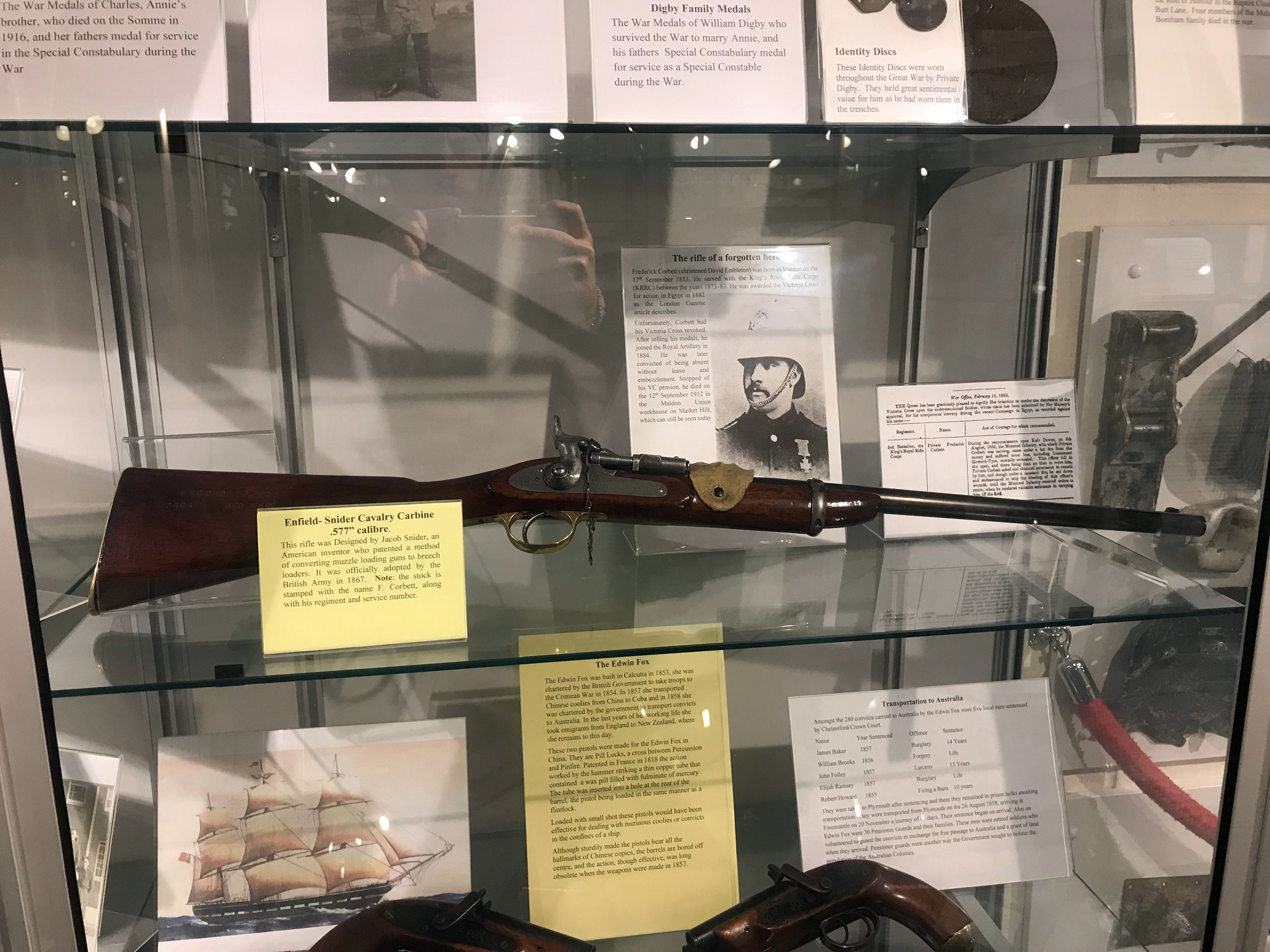
Frederick Corbett's Snider–Enfield rifle in the Combined Military Services Museum in Maldon, Essex

== Death ==
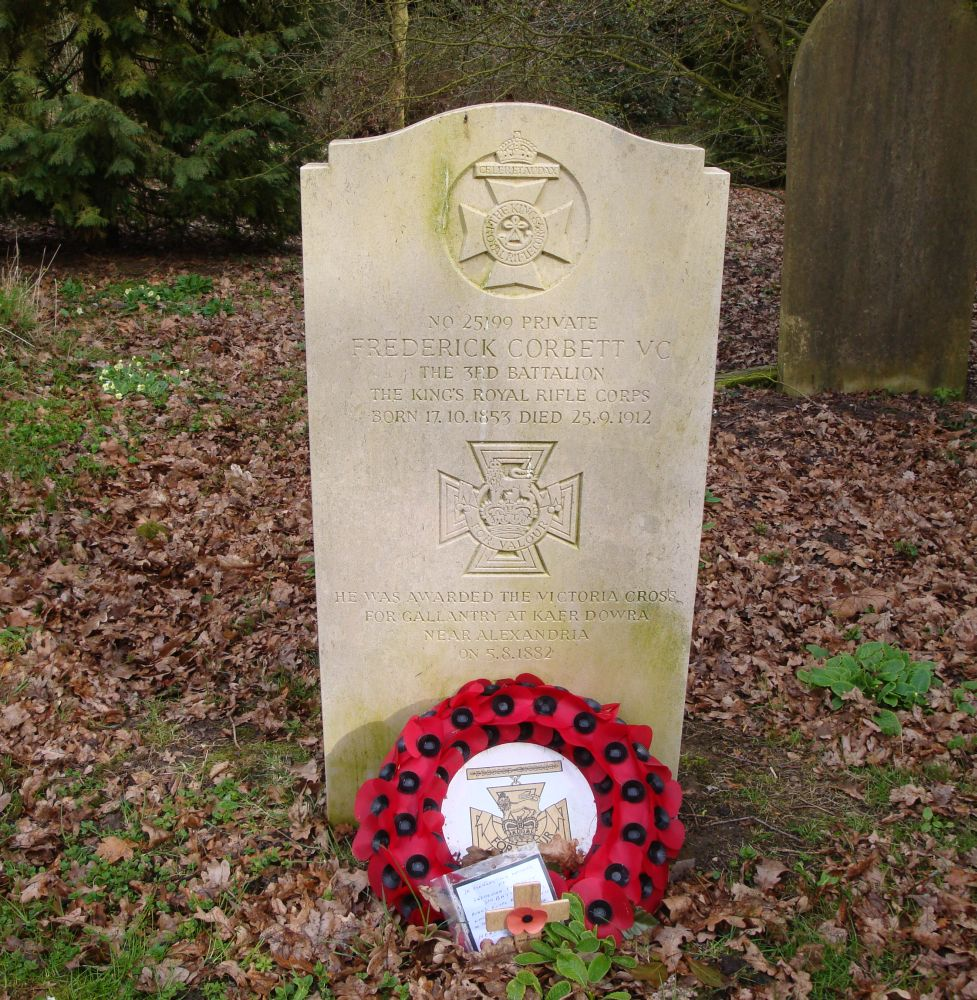
Headstone over Frederick Corbett's grave in Maldon Cemetery, Essex

Corbett died in Maldon Union Workhouse on 25 September 1912. He was buried in an unmarked grave in Maldon cemetery. On 16 April 2004, a regimental headstone was placed over the grave and, in a simple ceremony, the headstone, covered in the regimental flag of the 60th Rifles, was unveiled by Lieutenant General Sir Christopher Wallace. Howard Vyse, the man he tried to save, was buried with three other fatalities shortly after the battle at the English cemetery outside the (now demolished) Rosetta Gate of Alexandria.
