= Urabi revolt =

1879–1882 nationalist uprising in Egypt

ʻUrabi revolt
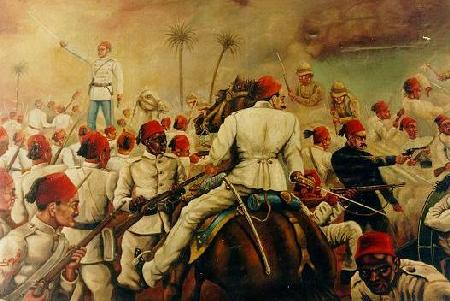
- Portrayal of the revolt by The Illustrated London News
Date	1879–1882
Location	Egypt
Result	Revolt suppressed: ʻUrabi exiled; British intervention in Egypt

Belligerents
Khedivate of Egypt (Khedivalist forces); United Kingdom: India	ʻUrabilist forces

Commanders and leaders
Tewfik Pasha (United Kingdom) Garnet Wolseley (United Kingdom) Beauchamp Seymour	Ahmed ʻUrabi; Mahmoud Fehmy; Mahmoud el-Baroudi

Strength
36,000 (1879) (United Kingdom) 40,560 (1882)	11,300 regulars; 50,000 reservists and irregular troops

The ʻUrabi revolt, also known as the ʻUrabi Revolution (Arabic: الثورة العرابية), was a nationalist uprising in the Khedivate of Egypt from 1879 to 1882. It was led by and named for Colonel Ahmed Urabi and sought to depose the khedive, Tewfik Pasha, and end British and French influence over the country.

The uprising was ended by the Anglo-Egyptian War and the British takeover of the country, beginning the history of Egypt under the British.

== Prologue ==
Egypt in the 1870s was under heavy foreign influence, corruption, misgovernment, and in a state of financial ruin. Huge debts rung up by its ruler Ismaʻil Pasha could no longer be repaid, and under pressure from the European banks that held the debt, the country's finances were being controlled by representatives of France and Britain via the Caisse de la Dette Publique. When Ismaʻil tried to rouse the Egyptian people against this foreign intervention, he was deposed by the British and replaced by his more pliable son Tewfik Pasha.

The upper ranks of the civil service, the army and the business world had become dominated by Europeans, who were paid more than native Egyptians. Within Egypt, a parallel legal system for suing Europeans separately from the natives was set up. This angered educated and ambitious Egyptians in the military and civil service who felt that the European domination of top positions was preventing their own advancement. The heavily taxed Egyptian peasants were also discontented by their taxes going to Europeans who lived in relative wealth.

Egyptians resented not only Western European domination but also the Turks, Circassians and Albanians, who controlled most other elite positions in the government and military. Albanian troops had come to Egypt along with Muhammad Ali and helped him to take control of the country and were highly favoured by the Khedive. Ottoman Turkish was still the official language of the army and Turks were more likely to be promoted. In the ruling cabinet under Khedive Tewfiq, every member was a Turco-Circassian. The growing fiscal crisis in the country forced the Khedive to drastically cut the army. From a height of 94,000 troops in 1874, its strength was cut to 36,000 in 1879, with plans to shrink it even more. This created a large class of unemployed and disaffected army officers within the country. The disastrous war with the Ethiopian Empire of 1875–1876 also angered the officers, who felt that the government had sent them unwisely into the conflict.

A public consciousness was developing in Egypt during this period, literacy was spreading, and more periodicals were being published in the 1870s and 1880s, such as the influential magazine Abu Naddara (أبو نظارة 'guy with the glasses'). Published by Yaʿqūb Ṣanūʿ, a Jew of Italian and Egyptian origins, this Paris-based publication was a political satire magazine that often mocked the establishment under European control, and it increasingly irritated the ruling powers as well as the Europeans as it favoured reform and revolutionary movements, and Ṣanūʿ is credited with having coined and introduced the anti-colonial slogan "Egypt for the Egyptians" (مصر للمصريين). Abu Naddara had a wide reach since, unlike many other publications, Abu Naddara was written in Egyptian Arabic rather than Modern Standard Arabic, making its satire and political pieces understandable to the masses, not just the educated elite. Yaʿqūb Ṣanūʿ claimed that his magazine reached a circulation of 10,000, which was a huge number in those days.

During this time, Ahmed ʻUrabi, a native non-European army officer, had risen to the rank of colonel. Because of his peasant upbringing and traditional training, he came to be viewed by many as the authentic voice of the people of Egypt. To them, he represented a peasant population frustrated with tax-exempt foreigners and wealthy local landlords. ʻUrabi commanded the respect and support of not only the peasantry but also a large portion of the Egyptian army.

== ʻUrabi's seizure of power ==
Tension built over the summer of 1881 as both the Khedive and the Egyptian officers, now led by ʻUrabi, searched for supporters and gathered allies. In September the Khedive ordered ʻUrabi's regiment to leave Cairo. He refused and ordered the dismissal of the Turco-Circassian generals and the creation of an elected government. Unable to oppose the revolt, Tewfik agreed and a new chamber of deputies and government were established containing a number of ʻUrabi's allies.

== Foreign intervention ==
On January 8, 1882, the French and British sent a joint note that asserted the primacy of the Khedive's authority. The note infuriated the parliamentarians and ʻUrabi. The government collapsed; a new one with ʻUrabi as Minister of War was created. This new government threatened the positions of Europeans in the government and also began laying off large numbers of Turco-Circassian officers.

This broad effort at reform was opposed by European interests, many of the large landowners, the Turkish and Circassian elite, the high-ranking ulama (Muslim clergy), Syrian Christians, and most of the wealthiest members of society. In contrast, it had the support of most of the population, including lower-level ulama, the officer corps, and local leaders.

Copts were divided: their close affiliation with Europeans angered many and sometimes made them a target, but the deep rivalry between Coptic and Syrian Christians led many to align with rebels. The Coptic Patriarch lent his support to the revolt when it was at its peak, but later claimed that he was pressured into doing so. ʻUrabi and other leaders of the revolt acknowledged the Copts as potential allies and worked to prevent any targeting of the minority by nationalist Muslims, but were not always successful.

An effort to court the Ottoman Sultan Abdul Hamid II began. Tewfik Pasha called on the sultan to quell the revolt, but the Sublime Porte hesitated to employ troops against Muslims who opposed foreign colonial rule. ʻUrabi asked the Sultan to depose Tewfiq, but again the Sultan hesitated.

== British invasion ==
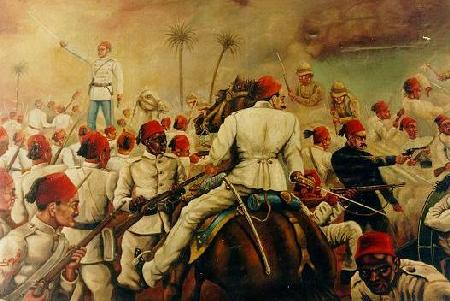
Portrayal of the revolt by The Illustrated London News

On the afternoon of June 11, 1882 the political turmoil exploded into violence on the streets of Alexandria. Rioters attacked Greek, Maltese and Italian businesses and battles broke out in the streets. About fifty Europeans and 250 Egyptians were killed. The exact cause of the revolt is uncertain; both the Khedive and ʻUrabi have been blamed for starting it, but there is no proof of either allegation.

As the city's garrison was maintaining the coastal defence batteries, an ultimatum was sent demanding the batteries be dismantled under threat of bombardment. The ultimatum was ignored, and the British fleet off Alexandria under Admiral Beauchamp Seymour, 1st Baron Alcester bombarded the city. The coastal batteries returned fire. The French fleet, also at Alexandria, refused to participate. A large British naval force then tried to capture the city. Despite encountering heavy resistance, the British forces succeeded, forcing the Egyptians to withdraw.

As revolts spread across Egypt, the British House of Commons voted in favour of a larger intervention. The British army launched a probing/scouting attack at the Battle of Kafr El Dawwar to determine whether or not Cairo could be advanced on from Alexandria, However the British concluded that the Egyptian defences were too strong, so in September of that year a British army was landed in the Canal Zone. The motivation for the British intervention is still disputed. The British were especially concerned that ʻUrabi would default on Egypt's massive debt and that he might try to gain control of the Suez Canal. On September 13, 1882, the British forces defeated ʻUrabi's army at the Battle of Tell El Kebir. ʻUrabi was captured and eventually exiled to the British colony of Ceylon (now Sri Lanka).

== Aftermath ==
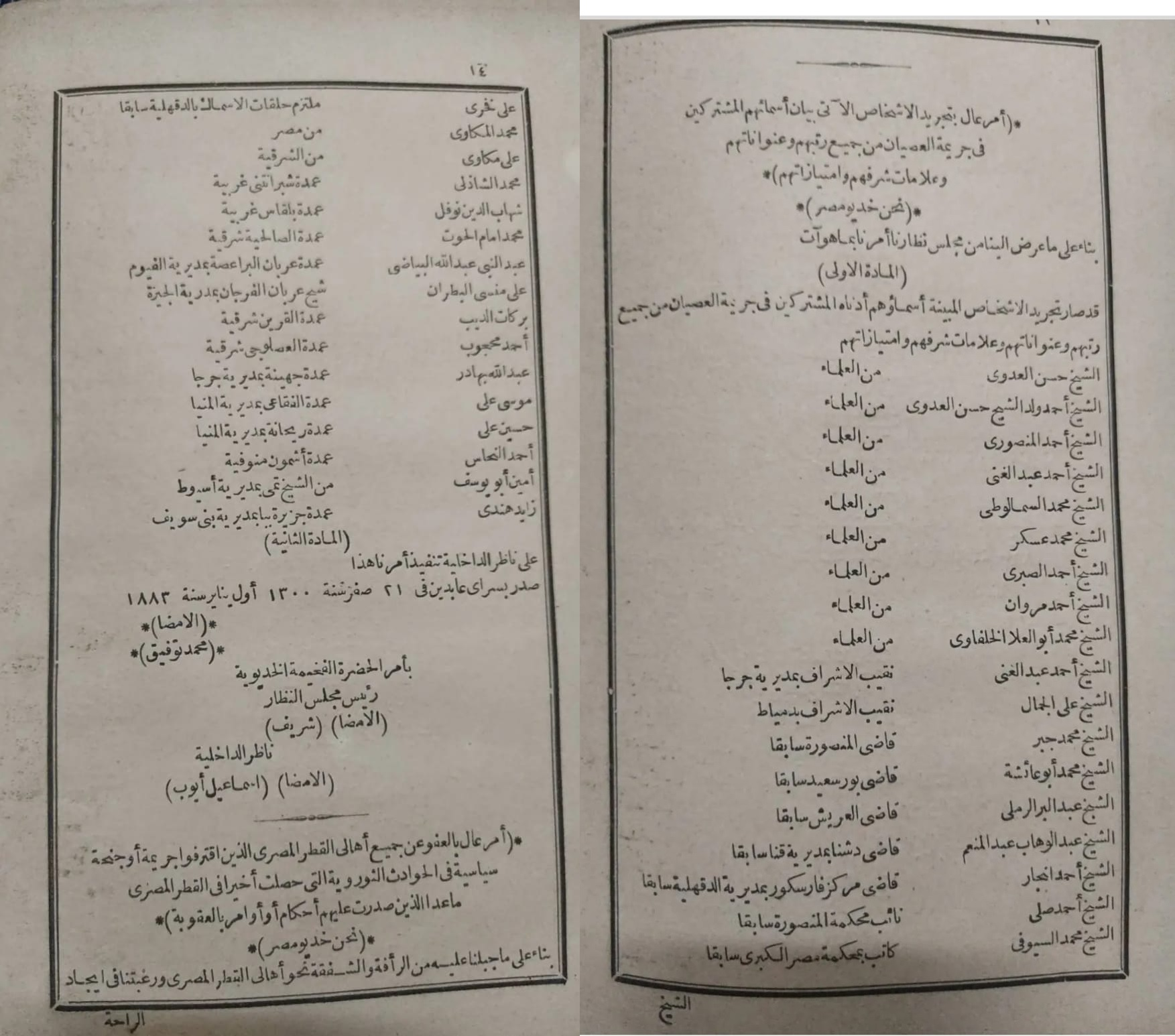
Khedive Tawfik Order at 1st January 1883 of punishing the civil leaders of the revilution including religious Shaikhs, Beduin tribes Sheikhs, city mayors, Judges, and other civil people.

While the British intervention was meant to be short-term, it persisted until 1956. Egypt was effectively made a colony until 1952. Both the British and the Khedival government did their best to discredit ʻUrabi's name and the revolution, although among the common people ʻUrabi remained a popular figure. The government used the state media and educational system to denounce him as a traitor, and the revolution as merely a military mutiny. Egyptian historian Mohammed Rif'at was one of the first to call the events a thawrah, or "revolution," but he claimed that it lacked popular support. Other historians in Egypt supported this thesis, and even expanded on it, sometimes suffering government censure. During the last years of the monarchy, authors became more critical of the old establishment and especially of the British, and ʻUrabi is sometimes portrayed as a hero of freedom and constitutionalism.

ʻUrabi's Revolt had a long-lasting significance as the first instance of Egyptian anti-colonial nationalism, which would later play a major role in Egyptian history. Especially under Gamal Abdel Nasser, the revolt would be regarded as a "glorious struggle" against foreign occupation. The ʻUrabi Revolution was seen by the Free Officers movement as a precursor to the 1952 revolution, and both Nasser and Muhammad Neguib were likened to ʻUrabi. Nasserist textbooks called the ʻUrabi Revolt a "national revolution," but ʻUrabi was seen as making great strategic mistakes and not being as much of a man of the people as Nasser. During Nasser's experiment with Arab socialism, the ʻUrabi revolt was also sometimes put in a Marxist context. Also during President Anwar Sadat's infitah (economic liberalisation) period, in which there was growing, controlled, economic liberalization and growing ties with the Western European bloc, the government played up the desire of the ʻUrabists to draft a constitution and have democratic elections. After the 1952 revolution, the image of ʻUrabi, at least officially, has generally improved, with a number of streets and a square in Cairo bearing his name, indicating the honored position he has in the official history.

== Views of historians ==
Historians have in general been divided, with one group seeing the revolt as a push for liberalism and freedom on the model of the French Revolution and others arguing that it was little more than a military coup, similar to those made about the 1952 movement. Among Western European historians, especially British, there was a traditional view that the ʻUrabi revolution was nothing more than a "revolt" or "insurrection" and not a real social revolution. By far the most influential Englishman in Egypt, Lord Cromer, wrote a scathing assessment of the ʻUrabists in his Modern Egypt. While this view is still held by many, there has been a growing trend to call the ʻUrabi uprising a real revolution, especially amongst newer historians who tend to emphasize social and economic history and to examine native, rather than European, sources.

The earliest published work of Augusta, Lady Gregory—later to embrace Irish nationalism and have an important role in the cultural life of Ireland—was Arabi and His Household (1882), a pamphlet (originally a letter to The Times newspaper) in support of Ahmed ʻUrabi and his revolt.

Historians have also been divided over the reasons for the British invasion, with some arguing that it was to protect the Suez Canal and prevent "anarchy", while others argue that it was to protect the interests of British investors with assets in Egypt (see Anglo-Egyptian War).
