= Mahmoud Fehmy =

Egyptian military officer and engineer (1843–1890)

- محمود فهمي
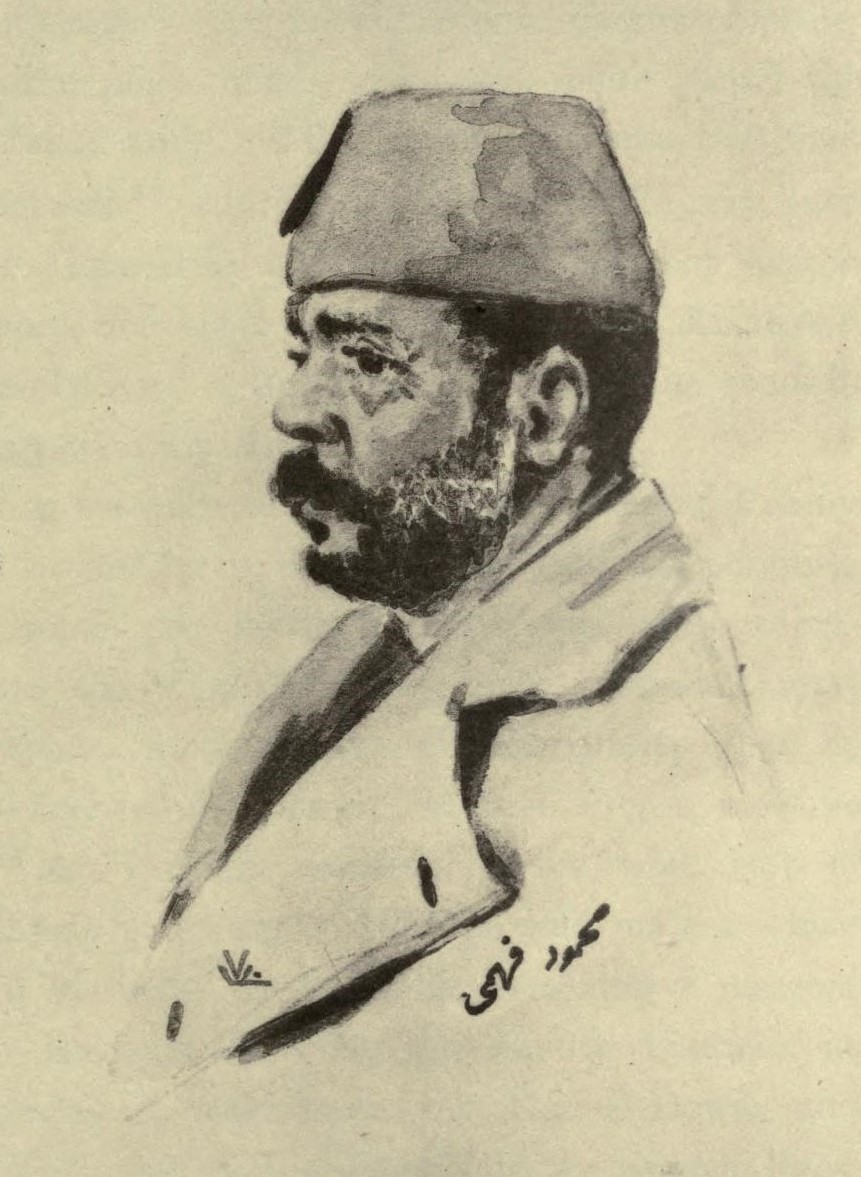
- An illustration of Fehmy at the time of his trial in late 1882.

Minister of Public Works; Chief Engineer, Egyptian Army
- In office 1882

Personal details
- Born: c. 1842 – c. 1843 Beni Suef, Egypt
- Died: 1890
- Occupation: Military officer; engineer; Minister of Public Works
- Known for: Chief military engineer during the ʻUrabi revolt (1879–1882); fortifications at Kafr el-Dawwar and Tell el-Kebir

Military service
- Allegiance: Khedivate of Egypt
- Branch/service: Egyptian Army

General Mahmoud Fehmy Pasha El_Masry born in Beni Suef (in Arabic: محمود فهمي باشا المصري; c. 1843 – c. 1890) was an Egyptian military officer and engineer who served as the Minister of Public Works and chief engineer of the Egyptian Army. An Egyptian nationalist, he participated in the ʻUrabi revolt, which lasted from 1879 to 1882.

During the 1882 Anglo-Egyptian War, Fehmy was given command over Egypt's military fortifications by the leader of the Egyptian government, Ahmed ʻUrabi. In this role, Fehmy oversaw the construction of military fortifications which were attacked by British forces at the battle of Kafr El Dawwar and the battle of Tell El Kebir. He did oversee the completion of Egyptian fortifications at Tell El Kebir due to being captured in an ambush by a group of British cavalrymen in August 1882, while on a walk with a fellow officer. His capture was a serious loss to the Egyptian military, as Fehmy was widely regarded as a talented military engineer.

Fehmy was held as a prisoner of war by the British for the rest of the war. After the conflict ended in 1882, he was tried in court by Egyptian authorities alongside ʻUrabi and other members of his regime, and found guilty of treason. Fehmy and his family were deported to Colombo, Ceylon alongside 'Urabi and other prisoners, where he died in 1890.

In 2021, Beni Suef Governorate named a square after him to honor his legacy as one of Egypt's national heroes native to the governorate.
