= Anglo-Egyptian War =

1882 British conquest of Egypt

- Part of the ʻUrabi revolt and Scramble for Africa and dissolution of the Ottoman Empire
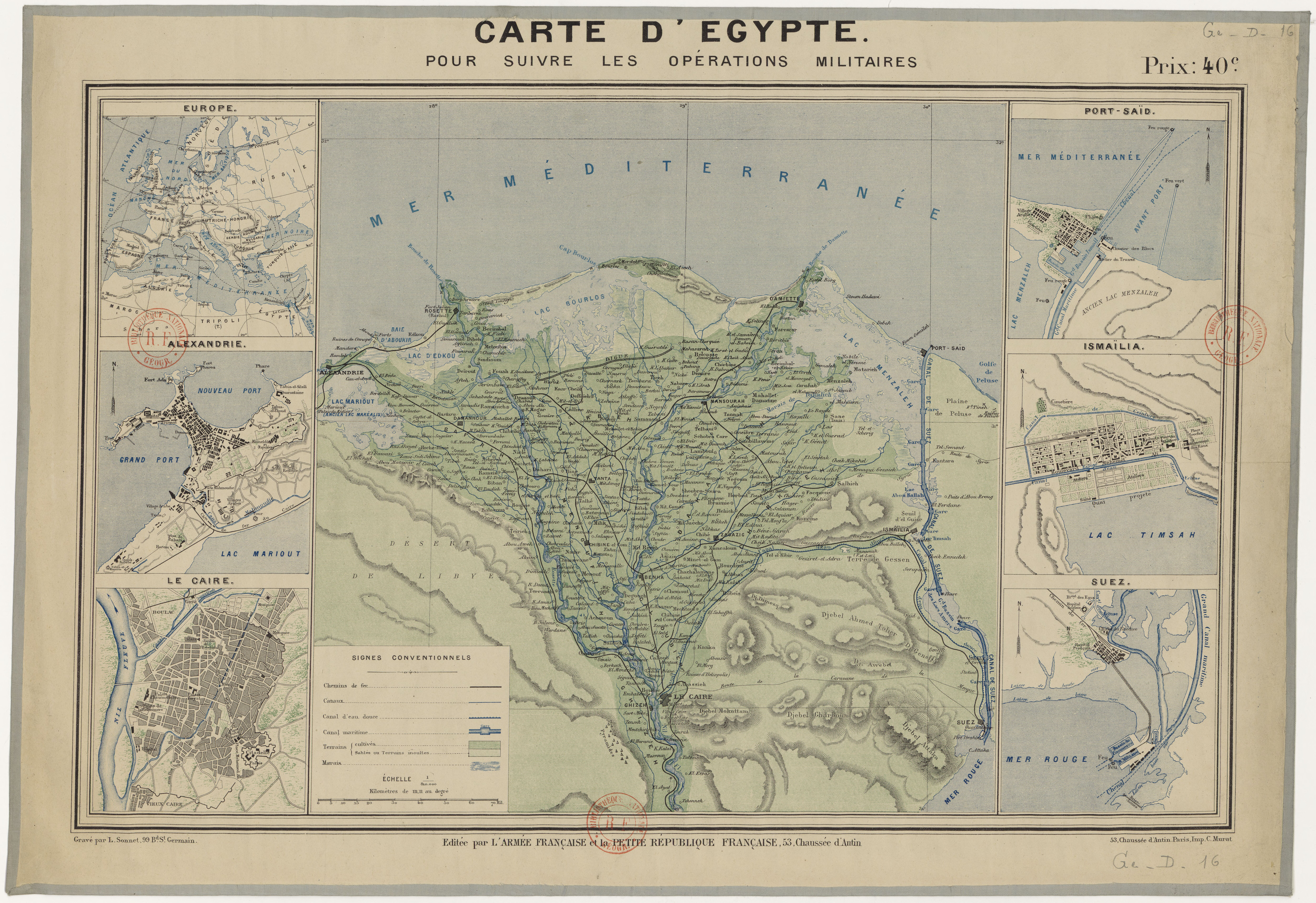
- French map of the military operations in Egypt
Date	July–September 1882
Location	Egypt, Ottoman Empire
Result	British victory: British occupation of Egypt

Belligerents
(Khedivate of Egypt) Khedivalist forces; United Kingdom: India	‘Urabilist forces

Commanders and leaders
(Khedivate of Egypt) Tewfik Pasha; (United Kingdom of Great Britain and Ireland) Garnet Wolseley; (United Kingdom of Great Britain and Ireland) Beauchamp Seymour	Ahmed ‘Urabi; Mahmoud Fehmy; Mahmoud el-Baroudi

Strength
40,560 regulars	11,300 regulars; 50,000 reservists and irregular troops

Casualties and losses
80–90 killed; 600+ wounded	2,000–4,000 killed or wounded (British estimates)

The British conquest of Egypt, also known as the 2nd Anglo-Egyptian War (Arabic: الحرب الإنجليزية المصرية, romanised: al-Ḥarb al-Injlīzīyah al-Miṣrīyah), occurred in 1882 between mostly Egyptian and Sudanese forces under Ahmed ‘Urabi and the United Kingdom.

Egypt was a country under growing foreign influence from global powers during the 19th century. In the early 1880s, the situation became explosive following the revolt of an army officer, Ahmed 'Urabi, against Tewfik Pasha, alongside the growth of rebel numbers in the country. The British intervened with the support of other colonial powers to colonise Egypt and succeeded in crushing the Egyptian-Sudanese forces. The anarchists who attempted to join the revolt were cut off from the insurgent troops and were unable to do so.

Ultimately, the war ended with a significant British takeover and occupation, the trial and exile of 'Urabi, the firm entry of Egypt into the British colonial empire, and the crushing of the anarchist movement in Egypt for at least two decades. It established firm British influence over Egypt at the expense of the Egyptians, the French, and the Ottoman Empire, whose already weak authority became nominal.

== History ==
=== General background ===
In 1881, an Egyptian army officer, Ahmed ‘Urabi (then known in English as Arabi Pasha), mutinied and initiated a coup against Tewfik Pasha, the Khedive of Egypt and Sudan, in order to end British and French influence over the country. In January 1882 the British and French governments sent a "Joint Note" to the Egyptian government, declaring their recognition of the Khedive's authority. On 20 May, British and French warships arrived off the coast of Alexandria. On 11 June, an anti-European riot occurred in Alexandria that killed 50 Europeans. Colonel ‘Urabi ordered his forces to put down the riot, but Europeans fled the city and ‘Urabi's army began fortifying the town. The French fleet was recalled to France. The British ultimatum was rejected, and the Egyptian forces began to wait for retaliation.

In parallel with these developments, there was a growing community of anarchists in the country, mostly drawn from Italian settlers. Despite their colonial roots, they viewed European colonisation with a very unfavourable eye, and one of their representatives traveled to the London Congress (1881) on behalf of Egypt, subscribing there to the programme backed by the famous anarchist Errico Malatesta, who supported founding a Black International and launching insurrections and revolts to spread the anarchist movement and carry out the social revolution. On the eve of the war, however, they were still divided into two opposing factions in Egypt.

=== Invasion and war ===
==== British bombardment and ‘Urabi's response ====
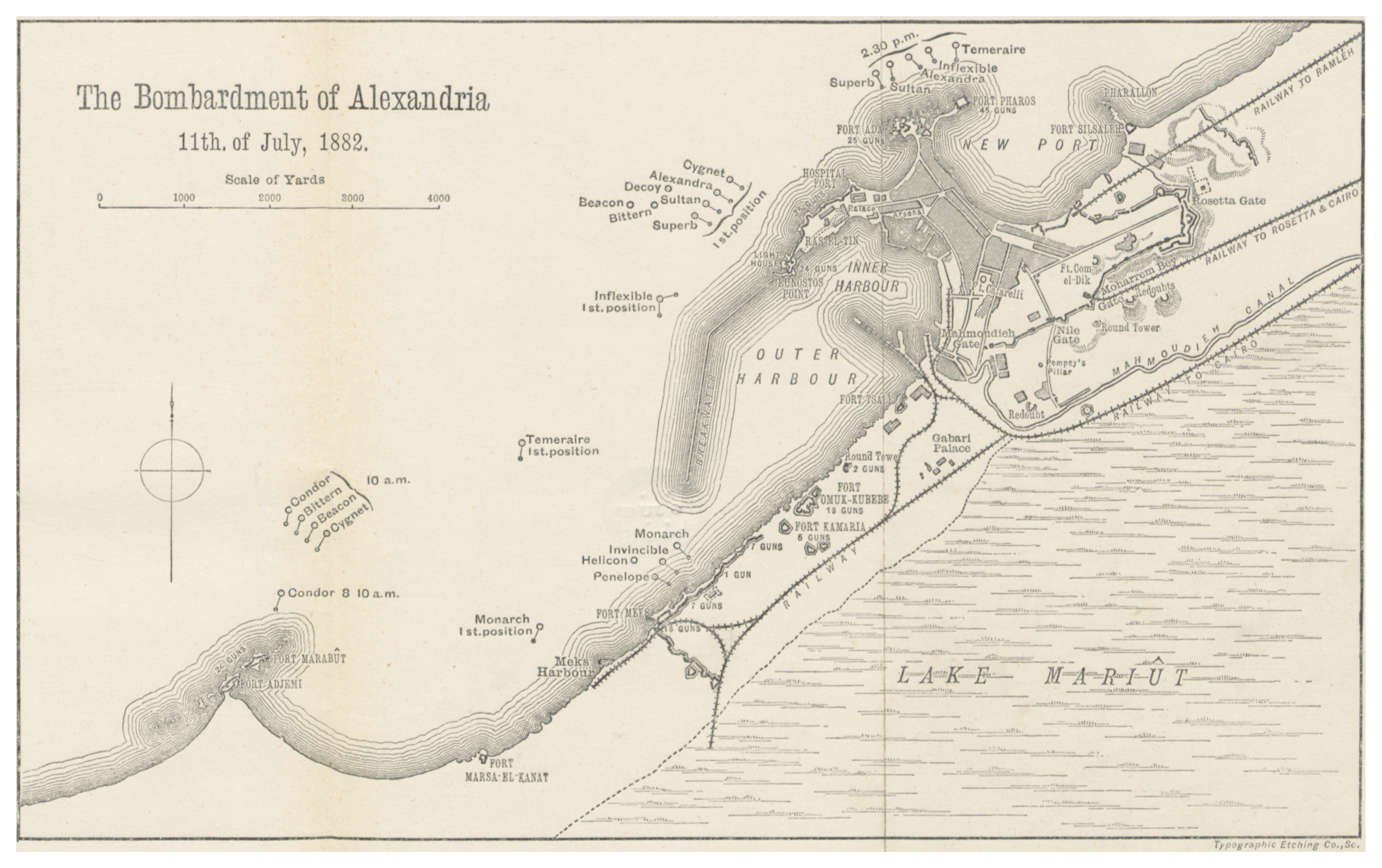
Bombardment of Alexandria

The British fleet bombarded Alexandria from 11 to 13 July and then occupied it with marines. The British did not lose a single ship, but much of the city was destroyed by fires caused by explosive shells and, according to contemporary British sources, by ‘Urabists seeking to ruin the city that the British were taking over. Tewfik Pasha, who had moved his court to Alexandria during the unrest, declared ‘Urabi a rebel and formally deposed him from his positions within the government.

After this bombardment, the two anarchist factions reunited; the faction of Andrea Costa, who had left Egypt in June, returned to the country. Meanwhile, ‘Urabi then reacted by obtaining a fatwa from Al Azhar shaykhs which condemned Tewfik as a traitor to both his country and religion, absolving those who fought against him. ‘Urabi also declared war on the United Kingdom and initiated conscription.

==== First attacks and arrival of anarchists ====
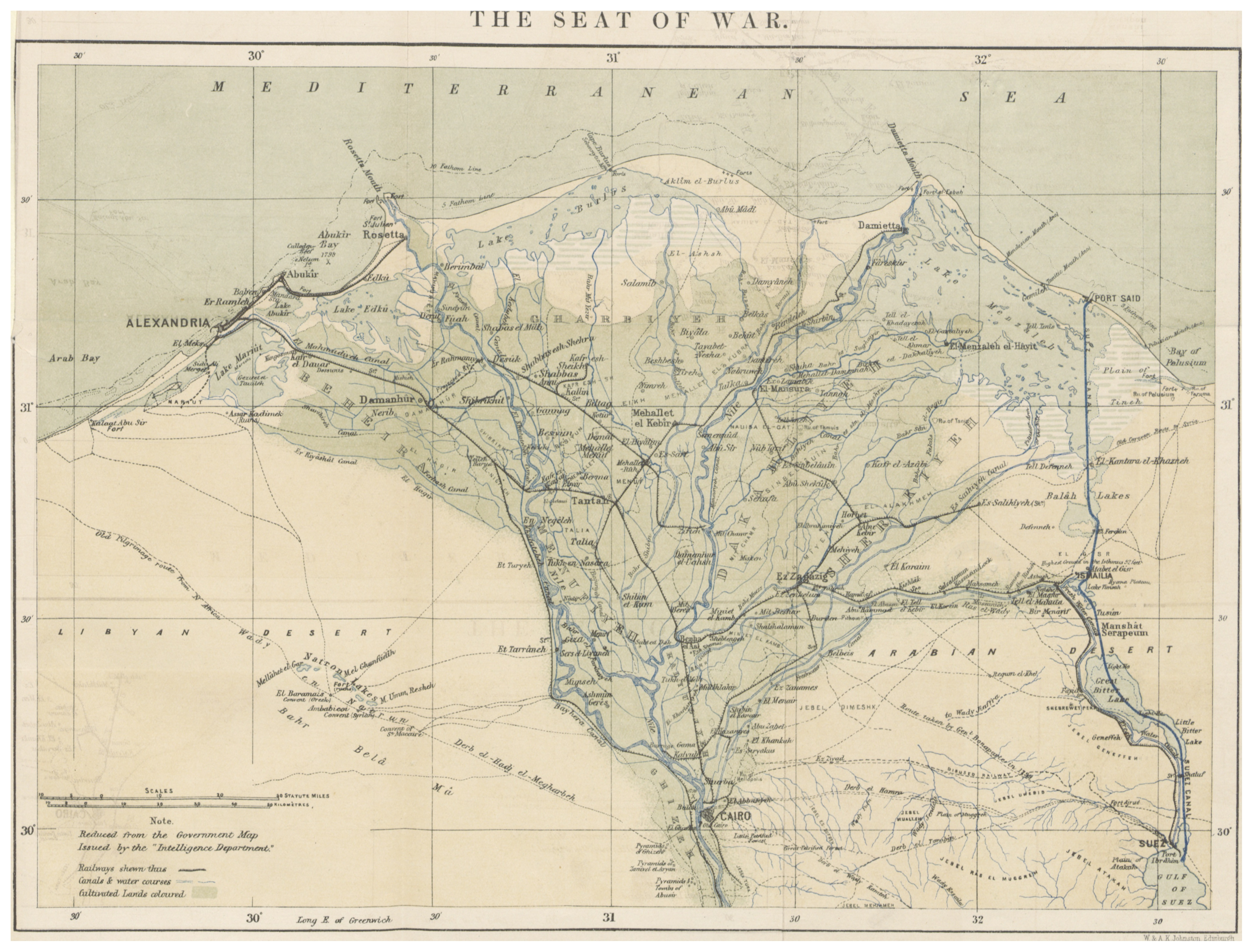
The Seat of War – Alexandria and the Nile-Delta (1882)

The British Army launched a probing attack at Kafr El Dawwar in an attempt to see if it was possible to reach Cairo through Alexandria. Afterwards, they determined it would not be possible to reach Cairo from this direction as Egyptian defences were too strong. In August, a British army of over 40,000, commanded by Garnet Wolseley, invaded the Suez Canal Zone. He was authorised to destroy 'Urabi's forces and clear the country of all other rebels.

The engineer troops had left England for Egypt in July and August 1882. The engineers included pontoon, railway and telegraph troops. Meanwhile, a group of at least six armed anarchists, composed of Malatesta, Cesare Ceccarelli, Gaetano Marocco (disputed relative of Alessandro), and the Greek Apostolo Paolides, traveled to the country to activate Italian networks in support of the revolt and also to join forces with 'Urabi. Their goal was to reach him in Damanhur and either to convince him to become an anarchist so he could guide the revolt in that direction or to launch an anarchist revolt themselves. They tried to do so in the next month, intenting on several occasions and points to cross the British lines separating them from 'Urabi's troops and provide support, without success.

Wolseley saw the campaign as a logistical challenge as he did not believe the Egyptians would put up much resistance.

==== Battle of Kafr El Dawwar ====
This battle took place on 5 August 1882 between an Egyptian army under Ahmed 'Urabi and British forces headed by Sir Archibald Alison. To ascertain the strength of the Egyptian's Kafr El Dawwar position, and to test local rumours that the Egyptians were retreating, Alison ordered a probing attack on the evening of the 5th. This action was reported by 'Urabi as a battle, and Cairo was full of the news that the advancing British had been repulsed; however most historians describe the action as a reconnaissance-in-force that was never intended to seriously assault Egyptian lines. Regardless, the British abandoned the idea of reaching Cairo from the north, and shifted their base of operations to Ismailia.

Wolseley arrived at Alexandria on 15 August and immediately began to move troops to and through the Suez Canal, to Ismailia, which was occupied on 20 August without resistance.

==== Battle of Tell El Kebir ====
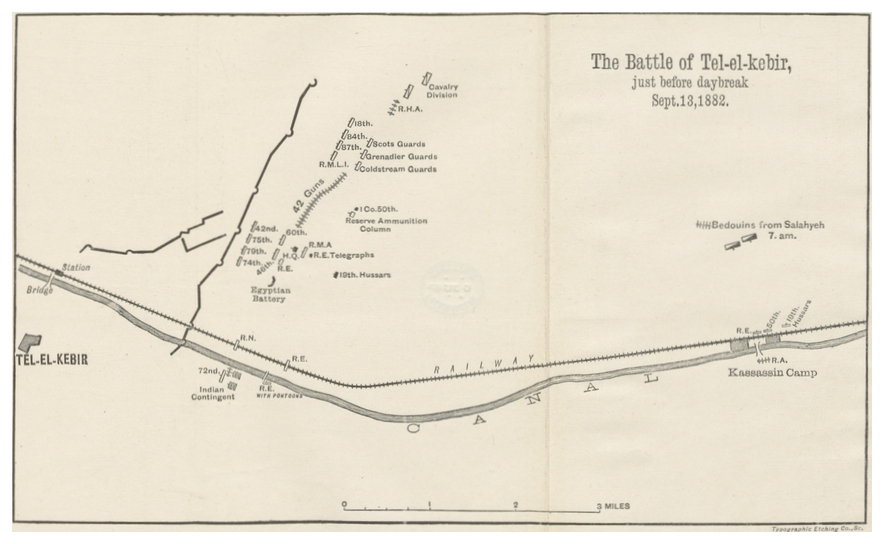
Tell El Kebir

Ismailia was quickly reinforced with 9,000 troops, with the engineers put to work repairing the railway line from Suez. A small force was pushed along the Sweet Water Canal to the Kassassin lock arriving on 26 August. There they met the enemy. Heavily outnumbered, the two battalions with four guns held their ground until some heavy cavalry arrived when the force went onto the offensive, forcing ‘Urabi to fall back 5 miles (8.0 km) with heavy casualties.

The main body of the army started to move up to Kassassin and planning for the battle at Tell El Kebir was undertaken. Skirmishing took place but did not interfere with the build-up. On 12 September, all was ready and during that night the army marched to battle.

On 13 September, ‘Urabi redeployed to defend Cairo against Wolseley. His main force dug in at Tell El Kebir, north of the railway and the Sweet Water Canal, both of which linked Cairo to Ismailia on the canal. The defences were hastily prepared as there was little time to arrange them. ‘Urabi's forces possessed 60 pieces of artillery and breech loading rifles. Wolseley made several personal reconnaissances, and determined that the Egyptians did not man outposts in front of their main defences at night, which made it possible for an attacking force to approach the defences under cover of darkness. Wolseley sent his force to approach the position by night and attacked frontally at dawn.

Surprise was not achieved; rifle fire and artillery from redoubts opened up when the range was 600 yards (550 m). Continuing the advance, the defending troops were hampered by the smoke from their weapons blocking their vision of the advancing British. The three battalions arrived in the enemy trenches all together and with little loss, resulting in a decisive victory for the British.

The British Army lost 900 troops while killing approximately two thousand Egyptians. Some British troops captured by Egyptians were brutally tortured to death. The ‘Urabi forces were routed, and British cavalry pursued them and captured Cairo, which was undefended.

Power was then restored to the Khedive, the war was at an end and the majority of the British army went to Alexandria and took ship for home, leaving, from November, just an army of occupation.

Lieutenant William Mordaunt Marsh Edwards was awarded a Victoria Cross for his gallantry during the battle.

=== Aftermath ===
==== ‘Urabi's trial and repression of anarchists ====
Prime Minister Gladstone initially sought to put ‘Urabi on trial and execute him, portraying him as "a self-seeking tyrant whose oppression of the Egyptian people still left him enough time, in his capacity as a latter-day Saladin, to massacre Christians." After glancing through his captured diaries and various other evidence, there was little with which to "demonize" ‘Urabi in a public trial. His charges were downgraded, after which he admitted to rebellion and was sent into exile.

The revolt had a grim outcome for the anarchist movement in Egypt, the repression targeting them was accelerated by the British, and many were forced into exile. Historian Costantino Paonessa wrote that this war:

Marked [the end] of the first two decades of the history of Italian working-class associationism in Egypt. It would not be until the end of the century that a true resurgence of the labor movement would occur among Italian, European, and Egyptian workers in the country.

==== British occupation ====
British troops then occupied Egypt until the Unilateral Declaration of Egyptian Independence of 1922 and Anglo-Egyptian treaty of 1936, giving gradual control back to the government of Egypt.

Hopkins argues that Britain continued its occupation of Egypt after 1882 in order to guarantee British investments: "Britain had important interests to defend in Egypt and she was prepared to withdraw only if conditions guaranteeing the security of those interests were met—and they never were." Consistent with this view, investment in Egypt increased during the British occupation, interest rates fell, and bond prices rose.

The 1936 treaty was abrogated by the Wafdist government in 1951 and sponsored guerrilla attacks by Egyptian Nationalists of British troops in the Suez Canal Zone. That started the Suez Emergency which resulted in 450 military deaths for the British and pressured them to sign the 1954 Anglo-Egyptian evacuation agreement which led to the final withdrawal of all British troops from Egypt, ending the British occupation of Egypt.

== Legacy ==
=== Historiographical debates for the invasion ===
The reasons why the British government sent a fleet of ships to the coast of Alexandria is a point of historical debate. In their 1961 essay Africa and the Victorians, Ronald Robinson and John Gallagher argue that the British invasion was ordered to quell the perceived anarchy of the ‘Urabi Revolt, as well as to protect British control over the Suez Canal in order to maintain its shipping route to the Indian Ocean.

A.G. Hopkins rejected Robinson and Gallagher's argument, citing original documents to claim that there was no perceived danger to the Suez Canal from the ‘Urabi movement, and that ‘Urabi and his forces were not chaotic "anarchists", but rather maintained law and order. He alternatively argues that British Prime Minister William Gladstone's cabinet was motivated by protecting the interests of British bondholders with investments in Egypt as well as by pursuit of domestic political popularity. Hopkins cites the British investments in Egypt that grew massively leading into the 1880s, partially as a result of the Khedive's debt from construction of the Suez Canal, as well as the close links that existed between the British government and the economic sector. He writes that Britain's economic interests occurred simultaneously with a desire within one element of the ruling Liberal Party for a militant foreign policy in order to gain the domestic political popularity that enabled it to compete with the Conservative Party. Hopkins cites a letter from Edward Malet, the British consul general in Egypt at the time, to a member of the Gladstone cabinet offering his congratulations on the invasion: "You have fought the battle of all Christendom and history will acknowledge it. May I also venture to say that it has given the Liberal Party a new lease of popularity and power."

John Galbraith and Afaf Lutfi al-Sayyid-Marsot make a similar argument to Hopkins, though their argument focuses on how individuals within the British government bureaucracy used their positions to make the invasion appear as a more favourable option. First, they describe a plot by Malet in which he portrayed the Egyptian government as unstable to his superiors in the cabinet. On Galbraith and al-Sayyid-Marsot's reading, Malet naïvely expected he could convince the British to intimidate Egypt with a show of force without considering a full invasion or occupation as a possibility. They also dwell on Admiral Beauchamp Seymour, who they claim hastened the start of the bombardment by exaggerating the danger posed to his ships by ‘Urabi's forces in his telegrams back to the British government.

=== Railway ===
During the buildup to the battle at Tell El Kebir the specially raised 8th Railway Company RE operated trains carrying stores and troops, as well as repairing track. On the day of the battle (13 September) they ran a train into Tell El Kebir station between 8 and 9 am and "found it completely blocked with trains, full of the enemy's ammunition: the line strewn with dead and wounded, and our own soldiers swarming over the place almost mad for want of water" (extract from Captain Sidney Smith's diary). Once the station was cleared they began to ferry the wounded, prisoners and troops with stores to other destinations.

==== Telegraph ====
In the wake of the advancing columns, telegraph lines were laid on either side of the Sweet Water canal. At 2 am on 13 September, Wolseley successfully sent a message to the Major General Sir Herbert Macpherson on the extreme left with the Indian Contingent and the Naval Brigade. At Tell El Kebir a field telegraph office was established in a saloon carriage, which Arabi Pasha had travelled in the day before. At 8:30 am on 13 September, after the victory at the battle of Tell El Kebir, Wolseley used the telegram to send messages of his victory to queen Victoria; he received a reply from her at 9.15 am the same day. Once they had got connected to the permanent line, the Section also worked the Theiber sounder and the telephone.

==== Army Post Office Corps ====
The forerunners of Royal Engineers (Postal Section) made their debut on this campaign. They were specially raised from the 24th Middlesex Rifle Volunteers (Post Office Rifles) and for the first time in British military history, post office clerks trained as soldiers provided a dedicated postal service to an army in the field. During the battle of Kassassin they became the first Volunteers to come under enemy fire.

== Order of battle of each force ==
=== Order of battle of the British Expeditionary Force ===
- Commander: Lieutenant General Sir Garnet Wolseley
- Chief of Staff: Lieutenant General Sir John Adye

- 1st Division (Lt Gen GHS Willis)
  - 1st Brigade (Maj Gen HRH The Duke of Connaught)
    - 2nd Battalion, Grenadier Guards
    - 2nd Battalion, Coldstream Guards
    - 1st Battalion, Scots Guards
  - 2nd Brigade (Maj Gen Gerald Graham VC)
    - 1st Battalion, The Buffs (East Kent Regiment)
    - 1st Battalion, Royal Irish Fusiliers (Princess Victoria's)
    - 2nd Battalion, Royal Irish Fusiliers (Princess Victoria's)
    - 2nd Battalion, York and Lancaster Regiment
  - Divisional Troops
    - 19th Hussars (2 Sqns)
    - 2nd Battalion, Duke of Cornwall's Light Infantry
    - A Battery, 1st Field Brigade, Royal Artillery
    - D Battery, 1st Field Brigade, Royal Artillery
    - 24 Field Company, Royal Engineers
    - 12 Company, Army Commissariat and Transport Corps
    - 1 Bearer Company, Army Hospital Corps (Half)
    - 3 Field Hospital, Army Hospital Corps
- 2nd Division (Lt Gen Sir Edward Hamley)
  - 3rd (Highland) Infantry Brigade (Maj Gen Sir Archibald Alison)
    - 2nd Battalion, Highland Light Infantry
    - 1st Battalion, Black Watch (Royal Highlanders)
    - 1st Battalion, Cameron Highlanders
    - 1st Battalion, Gordon Highlanders
  - 4th Brigade (Maj Gen Sir Evelyn Wood VC)
    - 1st Battalion, The Royal Sussex Regiment
    - 1st Battalion, Royal Berkshire Regiment (Princess Charlotte's)
    - 1st Battalion, The South Staffordshire Regiment
    - 1st Battalion, The King's Shropshire Light Infantry
  - Divisional Troops
    - 19th Hussars (2 Sqns)
    - 3rd Battalion, The King's Royal Rifle Corps
    - I Battery, 2nd Field Brigade, Royal Artillery
    - N Battery, 2nd Field Brigade, Royal Artillery
    - 26 Field Company, Royal Engineers
    - 11 Company, Army Commissariat and Transport Corps
    - 2 Bearer Company, Army Hospital Corps (Half)
    - 4 Field Hospital, Army Hospital Corps
    - 5 Field Hospital, Army Hospital Corps
- Indian Contingent (Maj Gen Sir Herbert Macpherson VC)
  - 1st Battalion, Manchester Regiment
  - 1st Battalion, Seaforth Highlanders
  - 7th Bengal Infantry
  - 20th Punjab Infantry
  - 29th Baluch Infantry
  - 7 (Mountain) Battery, Northern Division, Royal Garrison Artillery
  - (plus their own Commissariat, Engineers etc.)
- Cavalry Division (Maj Gen Drury Curzon Drury Lowe)
  - 1st (Heavy) Cavalry Brigade (Brig Gen Sir Baker Creed Russell)
    - Household Cavalry Composite Regiment (1 Sqn each from the 1st Life Guards, 2nd Life Guards and Royal Horse Guards)
    - 4th Dragoon Guards
    - 7th Dragoon Guards
  - 2nd (Bengal) Cavalry Brigade (Brig Gen H. C. Wilkinson)
    - 2nd Bengal Cavalry
    - 6th Bengal Cavalry
    - 13th Bengal Lancers
  - Division Troops
    - N Battery, A Horse Brigade, Royal Horse Artillery
    - Mounted Infantry Battalion (formed from Mounted Coys of line infantry battalions)
    - 17 Company, Army Commissariat and Transport
    - 6 Field Hospital, Army Hospital Corps
- Army Troops
  - Naval Brigade
  - Battalion, Royal Marine Light Infantry
  - G Battery, B Horse Brigade, Royal Horse Artillery
  - F Battery, 1st Field Brigade, Royal Field Artillery
  - H Battery, 1st Field Brigade, RFA
  - C Battery, 3rd Field Brigade, RFA
  - J Battery, 3rd Field Brigade, RFA
- " T Battery, 3rd Field Brigade, RFA
  - Royal Marine Artillery
  - 1 Battery, London Division, Royal Garrison Artillery
  - 4 Battery, London Division, RGA
  - 5 Battery, London Division, RGA
  - 5 Battery, Scottish Division, RGA
  - 6 Battery, Scottish Division, RGA
- Army Train
  - A (Bridging) Troop, Royal Engineers
  - C (Telegraph) Troop, RE
  - Railway Troop, RE
  - 8 Field Company, RE
  - 17 Field Company, RE
  - 18 Field Company, RE
  - A Company, Queen's Own Madras Sappers and Miners
  - I Company, QOMS&M
  - 8 Company, Army Commissariat and Transport Corps
  - 15 Company, ACT Corps
  - Auxiliary Company, ACT Corps
  - 2 Bearer Company, Army Hospital Corps
  - 1 Field Hospital, AHC
  - 3 Field Hospital, AHC
  - 7 Field Hospital, AHC
  - 8 Field Hospital, AHC
  - Army Post Office Corps (M Company 49th Middlesex Rifle Volunteers)

== See also ==
- Egypt Medal
- Khedive's Star
- List of conflicts in the Near East
