= Battle of Kafr El Dawwar =

Battle between Egyptian and British forces

Coordinates: 31°07′52″N 30°07′48″E

- Part of Anglo-Egyptian War
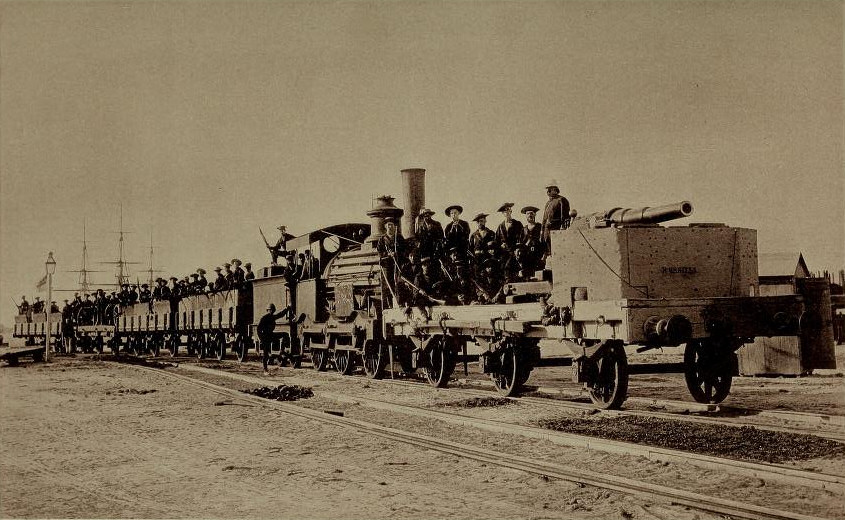
- The Armed Train at Alexandria
Date	5 August 1882
Location	Near Alexandria, Egypt
Result	Egyptian victory The British determine that Cairo cannot be advanced on from Alexandria.

Belligerents
United Kingdom	Egypt

Commanders and leaders
(United Kingdom) Sir Archibald Alison	Ahmed ‘Urabi; Mahmoud Fehmy

Strength
2,600 men	2,100 men

Casualties and losses
4 killed 27 wounded	79 killed many wounded 15 captured (Estimated 200 total casualties including dead wounded and POWs)

The Battle of Kafr El Dawwar was a conflict during the Anglo-Egyptian War near Kafr El Dawwar, Egypt. The battle took place between an Egyptian army, headed by Ahmed ‘Urabi, and British forces headed by Sir Archibald Alison. As a result, the British abandoned any hope they may have had of reaching Cairo from the north, and shifted their base of operations to Ismailia instead.

== Prelude ==
After the bombardment of Alexandria on 11 July, the city was occupied by a mixed force of sailors and marines. The Egyptians withdrew to Kafr El Dawwar, where they began the construction of an entrenched camp which would block the route to Cairo. ‘Urabi demanded that one-sixth of the male population of every province should be sent to Kafr El Dawwar. All old soldiers of every description were called upon to serve again, and horses and provisions were everywhere requisitioned for the army.

On 17 July, Sir Archibald Alison landed in Alexandria with the leading elements of the British expeditionary force: the South Staffordshire Regiment and a battalion of the King's Royal Rifle Corps. Combined with a battalion of Royal Marine Light Infantry and a substantial number of sailors from ships in the harbour, Alison's force numbered 3,755 men, seven 9-pounder and two 7-pounder guns, six Gatlings and four rocket tubes. He sent patrols in all directions to ascertain the strength and location of the Egyptians, but remained based within the city.

Alison was reinforced on 24 July by the arrival of the Duke of Cornwall's Light Infantry, a wing of the Royal Sussex Regiment and a battery of artillery — a total of 1,108 men. He immediately advanced to occupy Ramleh where he established a fortified base.

Egyptian forces in the area were later estimated as four regiments of infantry, one of cavalry and several batteries of artillery — totalling 12,000 to 15,000 men and outnumbering the garrison of Alexandria by at least four to one.

== Battle ==
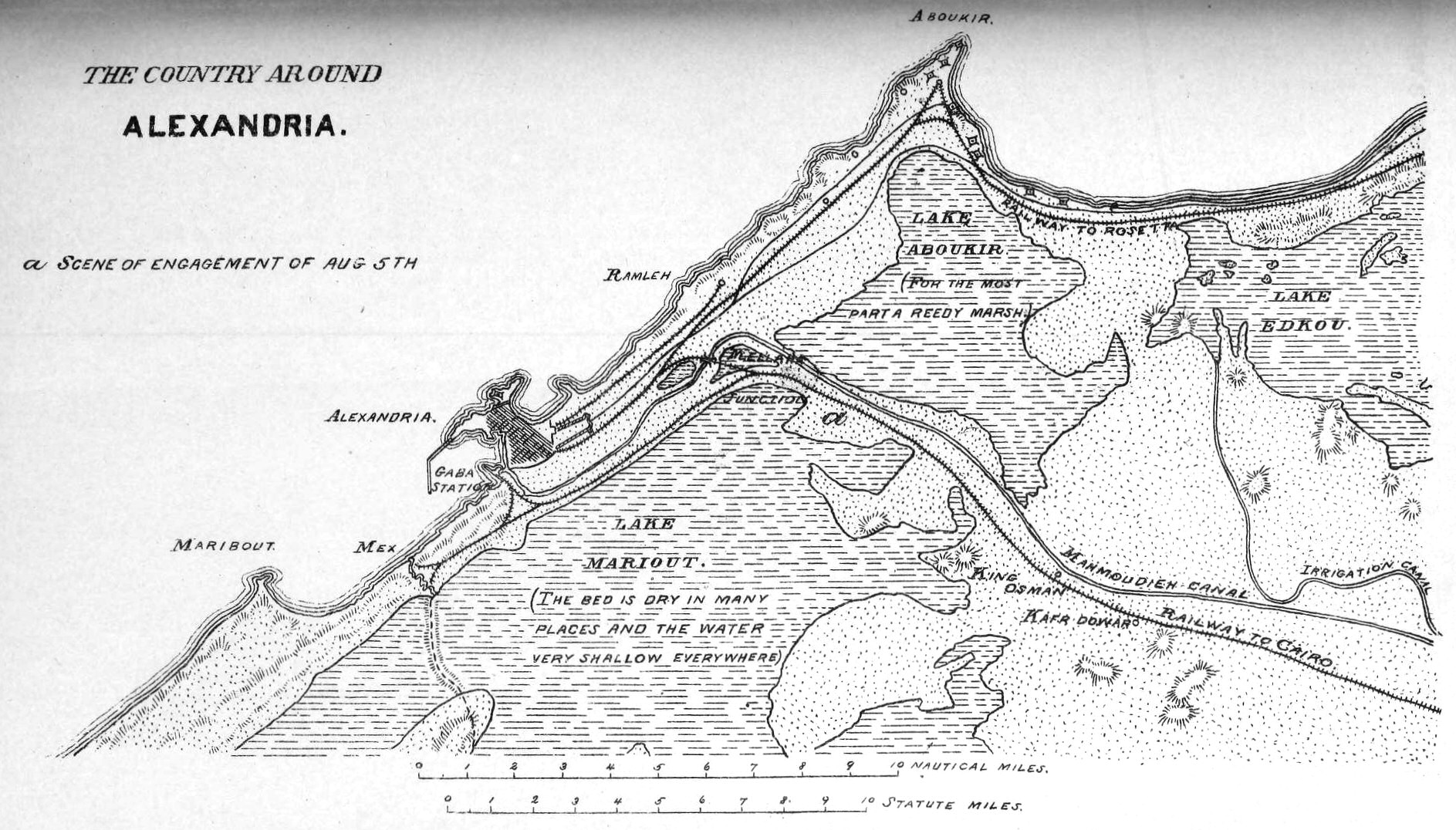
This map shows the main features of the countryside around Alexandria during the Anglo-Egyptian War of 1882

Seeking to ascertain the strength of the Kafr El Dawwar position, and to test local rumours that the Egyptians were retreating, Alison ordered a probing attack on the evening of 5 August 1882. The line of attack would follow the Cairo railway line and the Mahmoudiyah Canal which led, roughly parallel to each other, towards ‘Urabi's trenches.

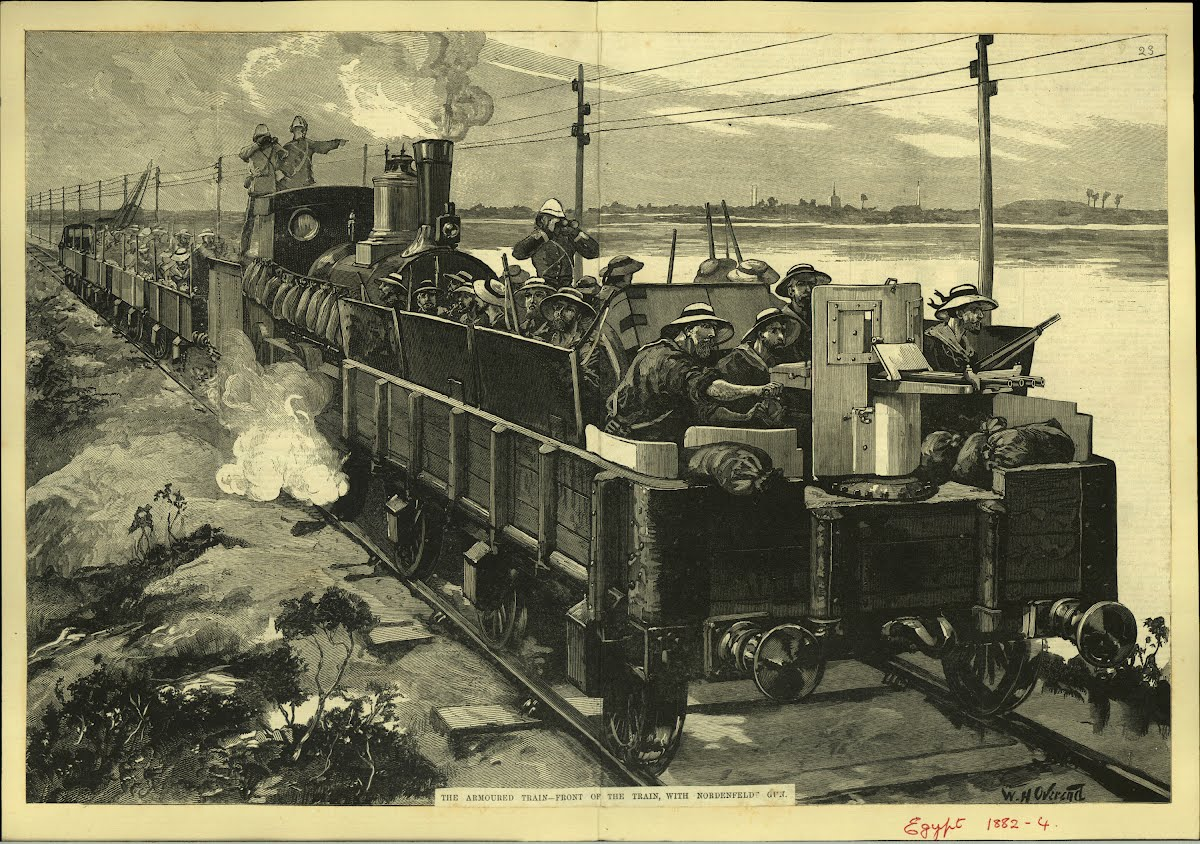
Armoured train with Nordenfelt gun

The British force was split into two wings: The left wing would follow the canal. It comprised four companies each of the South Staffordshire and Duke of Cornwall's regiments (800 men in all), accompanied by a naval 9-pounder gun and 80 mounted infantry who would operate on the East bank. On the West bank were six companies of Rifles (500 men) and another 9-pounder. The right wing would follow the railway line and was made up of 1,000 marines. It was supported by an armoured train, the brainchild of Captain Jacky Fisher, which sported a 40-pounder gun, a Nordenfelt, two Gatlings and two more nine-pounders. The whole force, including 200 sailors manning the train and the 9-pounders, numbered around 2,600 men.

Facing them in the Egyptian forward lines were a battalion of the Second Infantry, a regiment 1,200 strong, and 900 men of the Mustaphezin Regiment. They could draw on artillery and other support from the main Egyptian position.

The forces on the Eastern bank of the canal advanced with the mounted infantry leading the way under the command of Captain Parr and Lieutenants Pigott and Vyse. When these three officers, accompanied by six men, rode ahead to reconnoitre, they chanced upon a large body of Egyptians who immediately opened fire - mortally wounding Vyse, killing another man and wounding two others. Private Frederick Corbett stepped forward and attempted to staunch the bleeding of the officer's wounds whilst under a constant fire from the Egyptians, but to no avail: Vyse had been shot through the femoral artery and bled to death in 10 minutes. The party was ordered to retire, and did so carrying Vyse's body with them. Corbett was later awarded the Victoria Cross for his actions.

On the West bank of the canal, facing the Rifles, a large number of Egyptian troops occupied a ditch running across their front, behind which was a thick covering of bush. The Rifles advanced in skirmish order using fire and movement tactics to draw closer to their enemy. The 9-pounder kept pace with them along the canal towpath, firing the occasional shrapnel shell into the Egyptian position. The Egyptians maintained a steady but inaccurate fire, with most of their bullets passing harmlessly over the heads of their attackers. When the Rifles got to within 100 yards of the ditch, Egyptians could already be seen creeping off in twos and threes into the bush behind their position. When the order was given for the Rifles to fix bayonets and charge, the remaining defenders took flight, many throwing away their arms in the process.

At this point, the British left wing was ordered to halt. The commander of this part of the force - Colonel Thackwell of the South Staffordshires - had been ordered to advance until he reached a white house on the canal bank, which marked the closest point of the canal to the railway. Unfortunately for the British, there was another white house a mile short of their target which Colonel Thackwell mistook for his objective. The mistake would have serious consequences for the other British column.

The right wing came into position by rail, with the armoured train leading the way and the marines riding in a second train behind. Just beyond Mahalla Junction the railway line was broken, so the Marines disembarked and advanced under the cover of the railway embankment. The Egyptians, having trained their artillery on the break in the line in advance, opened fire on the armoured train. The British 40-pounder and two 9-pounders replied until they had silenced the Egyptian batteries. The 9-pounders then accompanied the marines in their advance, whilst the 40-pounder continued to give supporting fire from the armoured train.

As the marines drew ahead of the halted left column, they came under fire on their left flank from Egyptian soldiers posted along the banks of the canal. Seeing they were unsupported, the marines charged across the intervening ground, firing a volley before closing with fixed bayonets. The Egyptians fled in all directions, many being shot down or drowning in the canal as they attempted to reach safety.

The British were now deployed in a diagonal line across both the canal and the railway. Whilst a strong Egyptian force on the East bank of the canal maintained a fierce fire fight with the marines, General Alison (who had accompanied the right column) was able to survey the Egyptian fortifications. This he did for a period of about 45 minutes. At about 6:30pm, with the light failing and Egyptian reinforcements visibly appearing, a general withdrawal was ordered and carried out with great coolness and precision. By 8pm, all were out of action.

British casualties were one officer and three men killed and 27 wounded, 24 of the latter being from the right hand column. Egyptian losses, according to a deserter taken four days later, were three officers and 76 men killed and a large number wounded. An Egyptian officer and 14 men were taken prisoner Total Egyptian casualties have been estimated at 200 men.

== Reaction ==
The action was reported by ‘Urabi as a battle, and Cairo was full of the news that the advancing British had been repulsed. In London, The Times reported that "the result is felt by all concerned to be satisfactory". US military observer Caspar Goodrich, who could take a slightly less partisan view, later expressed this opinion:

Beyond the moral effect on the attacking force of a successful brush with the enemy, the reconnaissance in force was barren of results. The strength of the Egyptians was neither developed nor ascertained, nor was the position held from which they had been driven. The balance of advantages seems to be negative [for the British]; valuable lives were sacrificed, and the enemy regained the ground he had lost without suffering severely enough to be seriously affected.

Subsequently, the action was described by one historian as a "British attempt to break through at Kafr Ed-Dawar [which] ended in failure" Most others, like Goodrich, describe it merely as a reconnaissance in force which was never intended as a serious assault on the Egyptian lines.

== Aftermath ==
British troops continued to arrive at Alexandria over the following days, with the Commander-in-Chief Sir Garnet Wolseley himself arriving on 15 August. Two days later, Wolseley ordered the re-embarkation of many of his troops, and let it be known that he planned to land his forces in Aboukir Bay from where they could take the Egyptian works in the flank. On 19 August the fleet set sail, and 18 ships anchored in the bay in preparation for the supposed attack. At 8pm, though, a signal was given and the fleet proceeded eastward to Port Said.

The whole affair had been a ruse, intended to draw ‘Urabi's forces towards Alexandria, and to distract him from Wolseley's real intended base of operations on the Suez Canal. It succeeded admirably, and the British were able to establish themselves at Ismaïlia without incident. Whether Wolseley ever seriously intended to advance on Cairo direct from Alexandria is doubtful, with at least one account suggesting that he always expected the decisive battle to be fought at Tel El Kebir.

Wolseley left a division at Ramleh to guard Alexandria, under the command of Sir Edward Hamley. This force was made up of two brigades. The first, under Sir Archibald Alison, comprised one battalion each of the Royal Highlanders, Highland Light Infantry, Gordon Highlanders and Cameron Highlanders; the second, under Sir Evelyn Wood, comprised one battalion each of the Sussex Regiment, Berkshire Regiment, South Staffordshire Regiment and King's Shropshire Light Infantry. On 29 August Hamley, Alison and his brigade were ordered to join the main British force, leaving Wood's brigade to garrison Ramleh alone.

Fighting around Kafr al-Dawar broke out several times in August 1882. The Egyptians continued to menace Alexandria, whilst the British made occasional sorties to reconnoitre their position. But the Alexandria front had become a side-show, the decisive fighting of the war was taking place along the Sweet Water Canal.

‘Urabi's army was decisively defeated at Tel El Kebir on 13 September, and Cairo surrendered to the British on the following day. The works at Kafr El Dawwar were given up without a fight to Sir Evelyn Wood on 16 September. They were found to be exceptionally strong, with successive lines of ditches and embankments, covered walkways, gun positions, redoubts and embrasures, well stocked with modern Krupp artillery and arms and ammunition of all kinds. Held by determined defenders, they would have been extremely difficult to take.
