= Ahmed Urabi =

Prime Minister of Egypt (1882)

Ahmed ʻUrabi Pasha
- أحمد عرابي
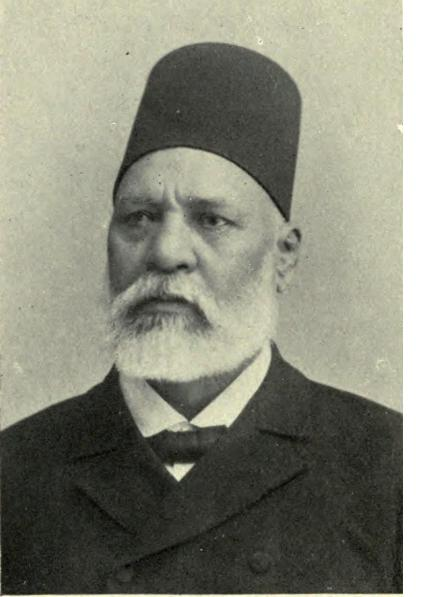
- ʻUrabi in 1906

Prime Minister of Egypt
- In office 1 July 1882 – 13 September 1882
- Monarch: Tewfik Pasha
- Preceded by: Raghib Pasha
- Succeeded by: Mohamed Sherif Pasha

Personal details
- Born: March 31, 1841 Zagazig, Egypt Eyalet, Ottoman Empire
- Died: September 21, 1911 (aged 70) Cairo, Khedivate of Egypt, Ottoman Empire

Military service
- Allegiance: Egypt
- Branch/service: Egyptian Army
- Rank: Brigadier general
- Battles/wars: Egyptian–Ethiopian War ʻUrabi revolt Anglo-Egyptian War

Ahmed Urabi ([ˈæħmæd ʕoˈɾɑːbi]; Arabic: أحمد عرابي; 31 March 1841 – 21 September 1911), also known as Ahmed Orabi, Ahmed Arabi or Orabi Pasha, was an Egyptian military officer. He was the first political and military leader in Egypt to rise from the fellahin (peasantry). Urabi participated in an 1879 mutiny that developed into the ʻUrabi revolt against the administration of Khedive Tewfik, which was under the influence of an Anglo-French consortium. He was promoted to Tewfik's cabinet and began reforms of Egypt's military and civil administrations, but the demonstrations in Alexandria of 1882 prompted a British bombardment and invasion which led to the capture of ʻUrabi and his allies and the imposition of British control in Egypt. ʻUrabi and his allies were sentenced by Tewfik into exile far away in British Ceylon, as a form of punishment.

== Early life ==
He was born in 1841 in the village of Hirriyat Razna near Zagazig in the Sharqia Governorate, approximately 80 kilometres to the north of Cairo. ʻUrabi was the son of a village leader and one of the wealthier members of the community, which allowed him to receive a decent education. After completing elementary education in his home village, he enrolled at Al-Azhar University to complete his schooling in 1849. He entered the army and moved up quickly through the ranks, reaching lieutenant colonel by age 20.

ʻUrabi served during the Ethiopian-Egyptian War (1874-1876) in a support role on the Egyptian Army's lines of communication. He is said to have returned from the war - which Egypt lost - "incensed at the way in which it had been mismanaged", and the experience turned him towards politics and decisively against the Khedive.

== Protest against Tewfik ==
He was a galvanizing speaker. Because of his peasant origins, he was at the time, and is still today, viewed as an authentic voice of the Egyptian people. Indeed, he was known by his followers as 'El Wahid' (the Only One), and when the British poet and explorer Wilfrid Blunt went to meet him, he found the entrance of ʻUrabi's house was blocked with supplicants. When Khedive Tewfik issued a new law preventing peasants from becoming officers, ʻUrabi led the group protesting the preference shown to aristocratic officers (again, largely Egyptians of foreign descent). ʻUrabi repeatedly condemned severe prevalent racial discrimination of ethnic Egyptians in the army. He and his followers, who included most of the army, were successful and the law was repealed. In 1879 they formed the Egyptian Nationalist Party in the hopes of fostering a stronger national identity.

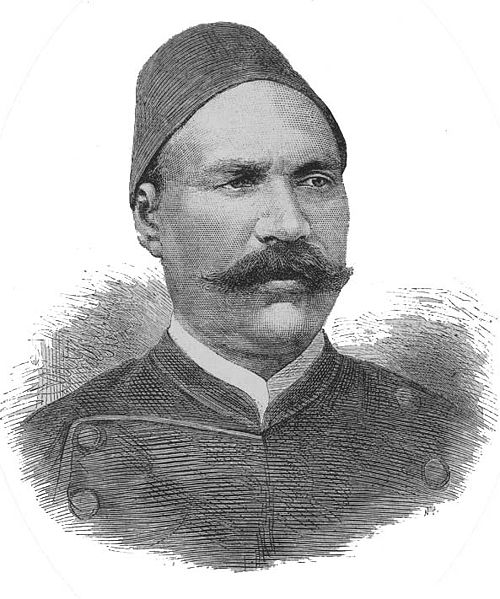
Portrait of Ahmed Orabi from 1882

He and his allies in the army joined with the reformers in February 1882 to demand change. This revolt, also known as the ʻUrabi revolt, was primarily inspired by his desire for social justice for the Egyptians based on equal standing before the law. With the support of the peasants as well, he launched a broader effort to try to wrest Egypt and Sudan from foreign control, and also to end the absolutist regime of the Khedive, who was himself subject to European influence under the rules of the Caisse de la Dette Publique. The Arab-Egyptian deputies demanded a constitution that granted the state parliamentary power. The revolt then spread to express resentment of the undue influence of foreigners, including the predominantly Turko-Circassian aristocracy from other parts of the Ottoman Empire.

== Parliament planning ==
ʻUrabi was first promoted to Bey, then made under-secretary of war, and ultimately a member of the cabinet. Plans were developed to create a parliamentary assembly. During the last months of the revolt (July to September 1882), it was claimed that ʻUrabi held the office of Prime Minister of the hastily created common law government based on popular sovereignty. Feeling threatened, Khedive Tewfik requested assistance against ʻUrabi from the Ottoman Sultan, to whom Egypt and Sudan still owed technical fealty. The Sublime Porte hesitated in responding to the request.

== British Invasion ==
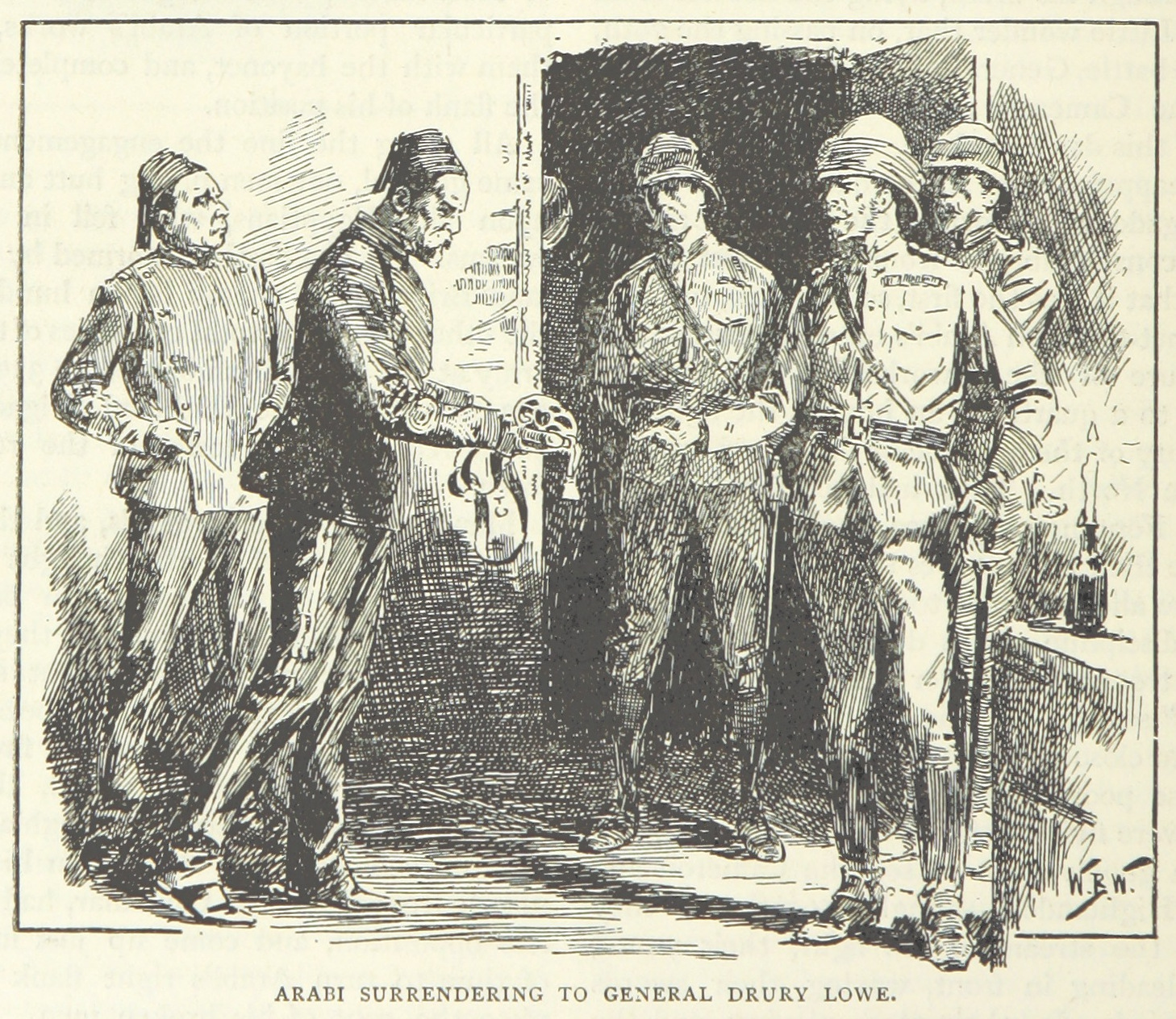
ʻUrabi surrenders to Drury Drury-Lowe

The British were especially concerned that ʻUrabi would default on Egypt's massive debt and that he might try to gain control of the Suez Canal. Therefore, they and the French dispatched warships to Egypt to prevent such an eventuality from occurring. Tewfik fled to their protection, moving his court to Alexandria. The strong naval presence spurred fears of an imminent invasion (as had been the case in Tunisia in 1881) causing anti-Christian riots to break out in Alexandria on 12 June 1882. The French fleet was recalled to France, while the Royal Navy warships in the harbor opened fire on the city's artillery emplacements after the Egyptians ignored an ultimatum from Admiral Seymour to remove them.

The Battle of Kassassin was fought at the Sweet Water Canal, when on August 28, 1882, the British force was attacked by the Egyptians, led by 'Urabi. They needed to carve a passage through Ismailia and the cultivated Delta. Both attacks were repulsed. The Household Cavalry under the command of General Drury Drury-Lowe led the "Moonlight Charge", consisting of the Royal Horse Guards and 7th Dragoon Guards galloping at full tilt into enemy rifle fire. Their ranks were whittled down from the saddle, but still they charged headlong, ever forward. Sir Baker Russell commanded 7th on the right; whereas the Household was led by Colonel Ewart, commanding officer of the Life Guards. They captured 11 Egyptian guns. Despite only half a dozen casualties, Wolseley was so concerned about the quality of his men that he wrote Cambridge for reforms to recruiting. Nonetheless, these were the elite of the British army and, these skirmishes were costly. Legend and a poem "At Kassassin", say the battle began as it was getting dark.

On September 9, ʻUrabi seized what he considered his last chance to attack the British position. A fierce battle ensued on the railway line at 7 am. General Willis sallied out from emplacements to drive back the Egyptians, who at 12 pm returned to their trenches. Thereupon Sir Garnet Wolseley arrived with the main force, while the Household Cavalry guarded his flank from a force at Salanieh. A total force of 634 officers and 16,767 NCOs and men were stationed at Kassassin before they marched on September 13, 1882, towards the main objective at Tell El Kebir where another battle was fought, the Battle of Tell El Kebir.

In September a British army landed in Alexandria but failed to reach Cairo after being checked at the Battle of Kafr El Dawwar. Another army, led by Sir Garnet Wolseley, landed in the Canal Zone and on 13 September 1882 they defeated ʻUrabi's army at the Battle of Tell El Kebir. From there, the British force advanced on Cairo which surrendered without a shot being fired, as did ʻUrabi and the other nationalist leaders.

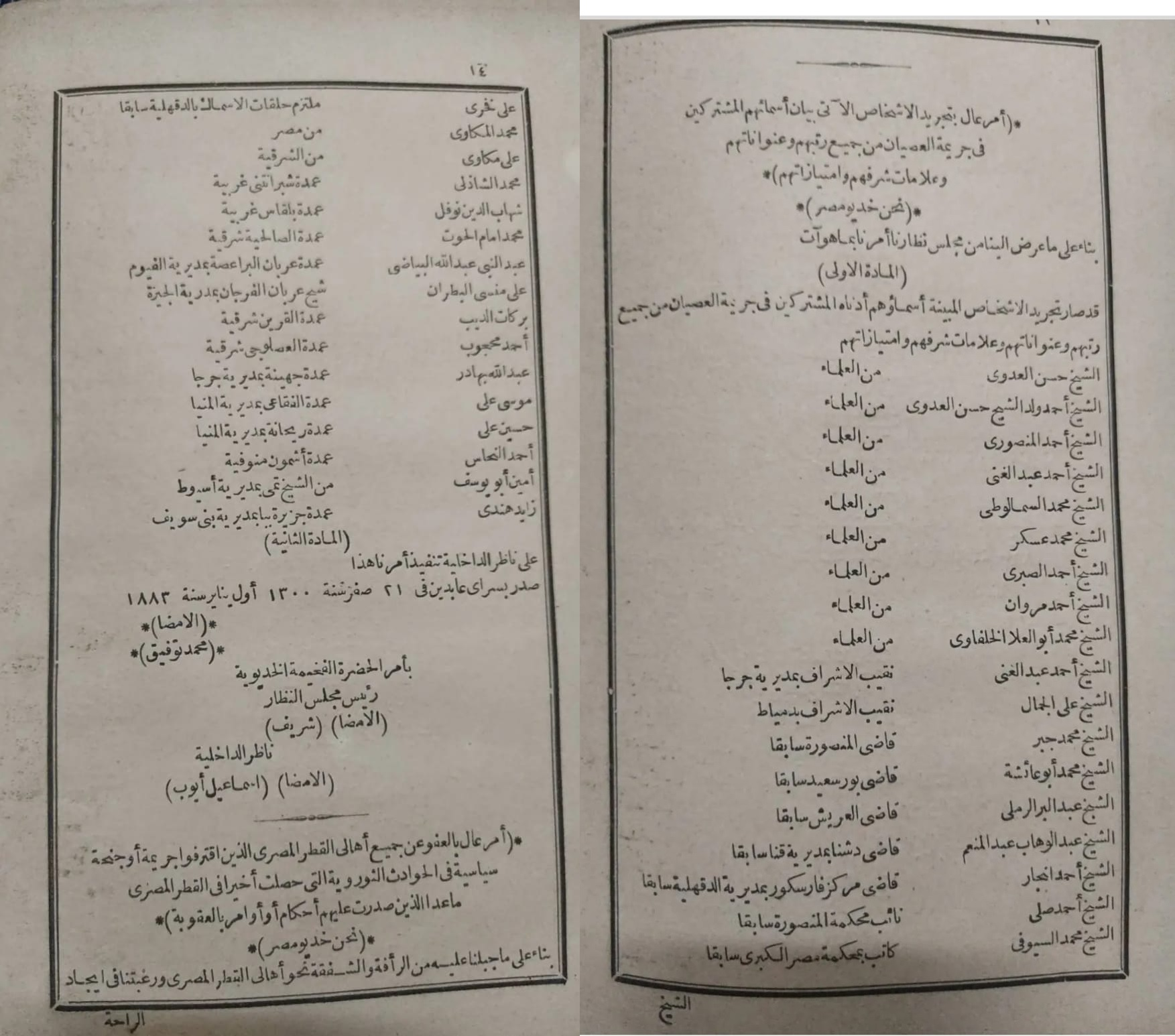
Khedive Tawfik Order at 1st January 1883 of punishing the civil leaders of the revilution including religious Shaikhs, Beduin tribes Sheikhs, city mayors, Judges, and other civil people.

== Exile and return ==
ʻUrabi was tried by the restored Khedivate for rebellion on 3 December 1882. He was defended by British solicitor Richard Eve and Alexander Meyrick Broadley. According to Elizabeth Thompson, ʻUrabi's defense stressed the idea that despite the fact that he had been illegally incarcerated by Riyad Pasha and the Khedive Tewfik he had still responded in a manner allowed under Egyptian law and with the hopes that the khedivate remain after his intervention, thus demonstrating loyalty to the Egyptian people as required by his duties. In accordance with an understanding made with the British representative, Lord Dufferin, ʻUrabi pleaded guilty and was sentenced to death, but the sentence was immediately commuted to one of banishment for life. He left Egypt on 28 December 1882 for Ceylon (now Sri Lanka). His home in Halloluwa Road, Kandy (formerly owned by Mudaliyar Jeronis de Soysa) is now the Orabi Pasha Cultural Center. During his time in Ceylon, ʻUrabi worked to improve the quality of education amongst the Muslims in the country. Hameed Al Husseinie College, Sri Lanka's first school for Muslims was established on 15 November 1884 and after eight years Zahira College, was established on 22 August 1892 under his patronage. In May 1901, Khedive Abbas II, Tewfik's son and successor permitted ʻUrabi to return to Egypt. Abbas was a nationalist in the vein of his grandfather, Khedive Isma'il the Magnificent, and remained deeply opposed to British influence in Egypt. ʻUrabi returned on 1 October 1901, and remained in Egypt until his death on 21 September 1911.

== Legacy ==
While the British intervention was meant to be a temporary state of affairs, British forces continued to occupy Egypt for decades afterwards. In 1914, fearing that the nationalist Khedive Abbas II would form an alliance with the Ottoman Empire against the United Kingdom during the First World War, the British administration in Egypt deposed him in favour of his uncle, Hussein Kamel. The legal fiction of Ottoman sovereignty was terminated, and the Sultanate of Egypt that had been destroyed by the Ottomans in 1517 was re-established, with Hussein Kamel as Sultan. No longer an Ottoman vassal state, Egypt was declared a British protectorate. Five years later, nationalist opposition to the United Kingdom's continued dominance of Egyptian affairs sparked the Egyptian Revolution of 1919, prompting the British to formally recognise Egypt as an independent sovereign state in 1922.

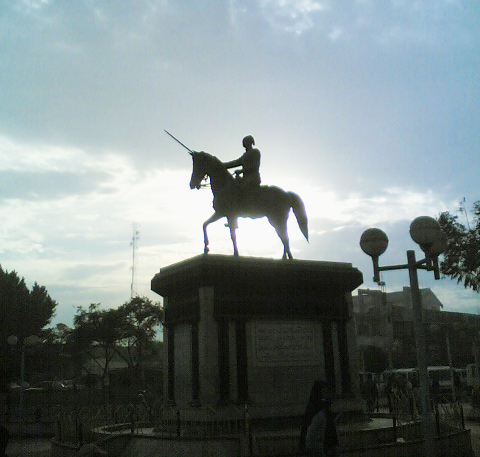
Statue of Ahmed Orabi in the city of Zagazig

ʻUrabi's revolt had a profound and long-lasting impact on Egypt, surpassing even the efforts of resistance hero Omar Makram in its significance as an expression of nationalistic sentiments in Egypt. It would later play a very important role in Egyptian history, with some historians noting that the 1881-1882 revolution laid the foundation for mass politics in Egypt. In July 1952, when Mohamed Naguib, one of the two principal leaders of the Egyptian Revolution of 1952, addressed crowds of supporters in Cairo's Ismailia Square on the toppling of King Farouk, he consciously linked this 20th century revolution to 'Urabi's revolt against the Egyptian monarch seven decades earlier, reciting 'Urabi's words to Khedive Tewfik that the people of Egypt were "no longer inheritable" by any ruler. The new revolutionary government mimicked 'Urabi in declaring that Ismailia Square, the main public plaza in Cairo, henceforth be Tahrir Square (Liberation Square). During the tenure of Gamal Abdel Nasser, who led the Revolution with Naguib and succeeded him as Prime Minister and later President, ʻUrabi would be hailed as an Egyptian patriot and a national hero. He also inspired political activists living in Ceylon.

== Tributes ==
=== Egypt ===
- Alexandria's Orabi Square
- Cairo's Al Mohandessin district has a main street and its underground station named after him.
- Zagazig's main square contains an equestrian statue of ʻUrabi, and its university's emblem bears his picture

=== Abroad ===
- Arabi, Louisiana, a suburb of New Orleans, was named in honour of 'Urabi as the residents of the suburb felt a sense of solidarity with him due to the fact that they were a part of New Orleans which sought to separate from the city.
- The Gaza Strip has a coastal road named Ahmed Orabi Street.
- Colombo, Sri Lanka, has an Orabi Pasha Street in its central district.
- Kandy, Sri Lanka, is home to the Orabi Pasha Cultural Centre.

== Quotes ==
- "How can you enslave people when their mothers bore them free?". The reference is: Once, a governor of Egypt punished a non-Muslim wrongly. The case was brought to the caliph of time (i.e. Umar ibn ul Khattab, the second Caliph of Islam) and the Muslim governor was proven to be wrong. Umar told the non-Muslim to punish the governor in same fashion, after it Umar said: Since when have you considered people as your slaves? Although their mothers gave birth to them as free living people.
- "Allah has created us free, and did not make us into heritage or estate. So by Allah, the only god, we shall be bequeathed or enslaved no more"

== Notes ==
- The earliest published work of Isabella Augusta, Lady Gregory – later to embrace Irish Nationalism and have an important role in the cultural life of Ireland – was Arabi and His Household (1882), a pamphlet (originally a letter to The Times newspaper) in support of ʻUrabi.

Political offices
Preceded by Isma'il Raghib Pasha	Prime Minister of Egypt (in rebellion)	Succeeded by Muhammad Sharif Pasha
