= Battle of Tell El Kebir =

Battle between Egyptian army and British military (1882)

Battle of Tel El Kebir
- Part of Anglo-Egyptian War
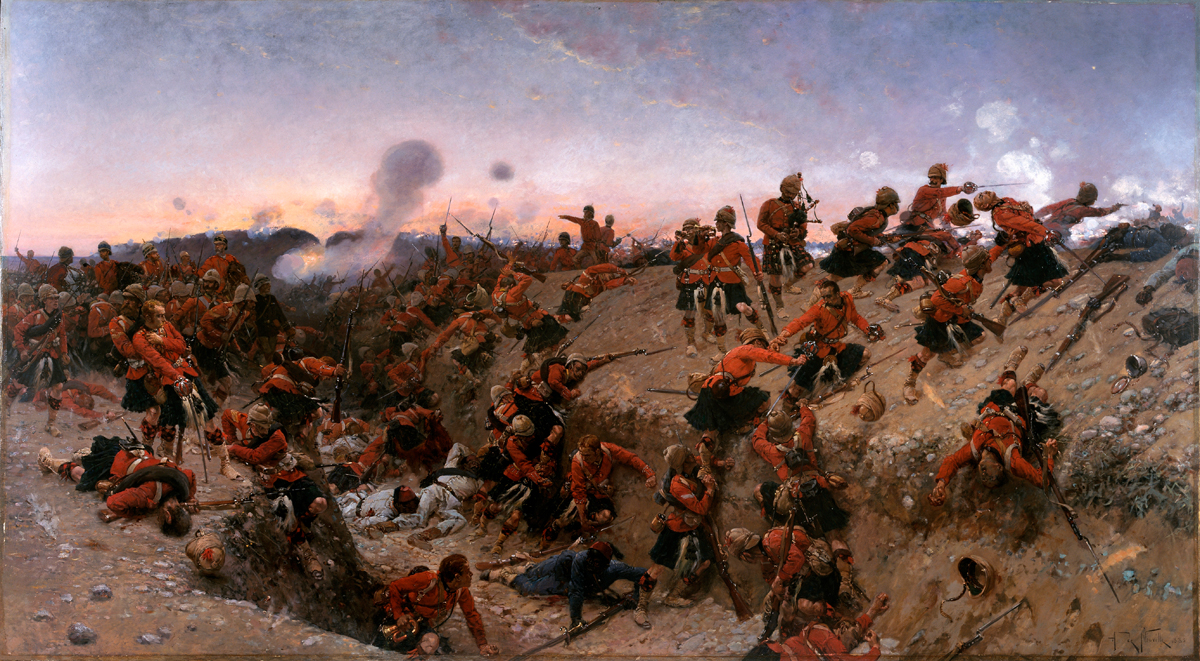
- The Storming of Tel el Kebir; Alphonse de Neuville, 1883
Date	13 September 1882
Location	near Kassassin, Canal Zone, Egypt 30°40′N 31°56′E
Result	British victory

Belligerents
United Kingdom: India	Khedivate of Egypt

Commanders and leaders
(United Kingdom) Garnet Wolseley	Ahmed ‘Urabi

Strength
13,000 troops 60 guns	18,000 troops (estimates); 60–75 guns

Casualties and losses
57 killed 380 wounded 22 missing	2,000 killed 58 guns captured
- Location within Egypt

The Battle of Tel El Kebir (often spelled Tel-El-Kebir), fought on 13 September 1882 at Tell El Kebir in Egypt, 110 km north-north-east of Cairo, proved the decisive engagement of the Anglo-Egyptian War of 1882. A British army led by Lieutenant General Sir Garnet Wolseley approached under cover of darkness and defeated an entrenched Egyptian force under the command of Ahmed ʻUrabi in a sudden assault.

== Background ==
=== Bombardment and invasion of Alexandria ===
On May 20, 1882, a combined Franco–British fleet arrived at Alexandria. At the same time, Egyptian troops were reinforcing the coastal defenses of the city in anticipation of an attack. These events heightened tension in Alexandria, and eventually triggered tumultuous rioting with loss of life on both sides. As a result of the riots, an ultimatum was sent to the Egyptian government demanding they order Urabi's officers in Alexandria to dismantle their coastal defence batteries. The Egyptian government refused. Meanwhile, tension increased between Britain and France over the crisis, as most of the losses had been non-French, the principal European beneficiaries of the revolution would be the French. Thus, the French government refused to support this ultimatum and decided against armed intervention.

When the ultimatum was ignored, Admiral Seymour gave the order for the Royal Navy to bombard the Egyptian gun emplacements at Alexandria. On July 11 at 7:00 am, the first shell was fired on Fort Adda by HMS Alexandra (1875) and by 7:10, the entire fleet was engaged. The coastal defenses returned fire soon after, with minimal effect and minimal casualties to the British fleet. No British ships were sunk. On July 13, a large naval force landed in the city. Despite heavy resistance from the garrison for several hours, the overwhelming firepower of the smaller British forces eventually forced the Egyptian troops to withdraw from the city.

== Prelude ==
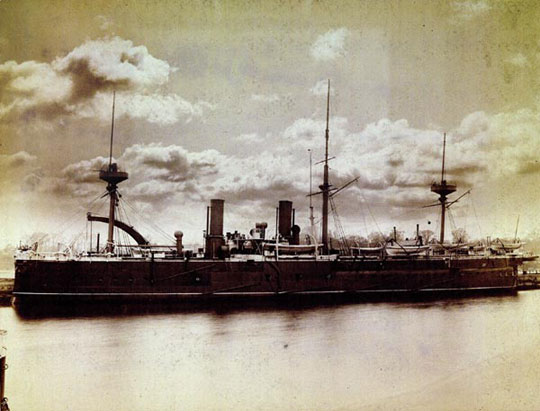
Photograph of HMS Alexandra

Lieutenant General Garnet Wolseley was placed in charge of a large force with the aim of destroying Urabi's regime and restoring the nominal authority of the Khedive Tawfiq. The total force was 24,000 British troops, which concentrated in Malta and Cyprus, and a force of 7,000 Indian troops which staged through Aden.

Wolseley first tried to reach Cairo directly from Alexandria. 'Urabi deployed his troops at Kafr El Dawwar between Cairo and Alexandria and prepared very substantial defences. There, attacks by British troops were repelled for five weeks at the Battle of Kafr El Dawwar.

=== Securing the canal ===
Wolseley then decided to approach Cairo from a different route. He resolved to attack from the direction of the Suez canal. 'Urabi knew that Wolseley's only other approach to Cairo was from the canal, and he wanted to block it. Ferdinand de Lesseps, upon knowing of Urabi's intentions, assured him the British would never risk damaging the canal, and would avoid involving it in operations at all costs according to Lutsky, he even "gave his word of honour to Urabi not to permit the landing of British troops in the Canal Zone, and Urabi trusted de Lesseps. By so doing, Urabi committed a grave military and political mistake". 'Urabi listened to his advice and did not block the canal, leaving it open for an invasion by British forces.

When Wolseley had arrived at Alexandria on 15 August he immediately began to organise the movement of troops through the Suez Canal to Ismaïlia. This was accomplished so quickly, Ismailia was occupied on 20 August without resistance.

Ismailia was quickly reinforced with 9,000 troops, with the engineers put to work repairing the railway line from Suez. A small force was pushed along the Sweet Water Canal to the Kassassin lock arriving on 26 August.

=== Egyptian attack at Kassassin ===
'Urabi attempted to repel the advance and attacked the British forces near Kassassin on 28 August. The British troops were caught by surprise, as they did not expect an attack. Fighting was intense but the two British battalions, with their 4 artillery pieces, held their position.

The British Heavy Cavalry, composed of the Household Cavalry and the 7th Dragoon Guards had been following the infantry and were encamped 4 miles (6.4 km) away. When the cavalry arrived, the British went onto the offensive and causing heavy casualties on the Egyptians, forced them to retreat 5 miles (8.0 km).

A further attack by Egyptian forces at Kassassin was repulsed and the Egyptians retired to their lines to build defences.

=== Capture of Mahmoud Fehmy ===
At around the same time as the first battle at Kassassin, the British scored a major success with the capture of the Egyptian chief military engineer, General Mahmoud Fehmy. The exact circumstances of his capture are unclear - according to one account, he had changed into civilian clothes due to the heat, and had gone for a walk accompanied by only one other officer when he was ambushed by a group of British cavalrymen. The loss of Fehmy was "a blow to the defence of Tel-el-Kebir for which there was no remedy", for the highly-regarded General had only recently arrived to oversee the construction of fortifications at the site.

== Battle ==
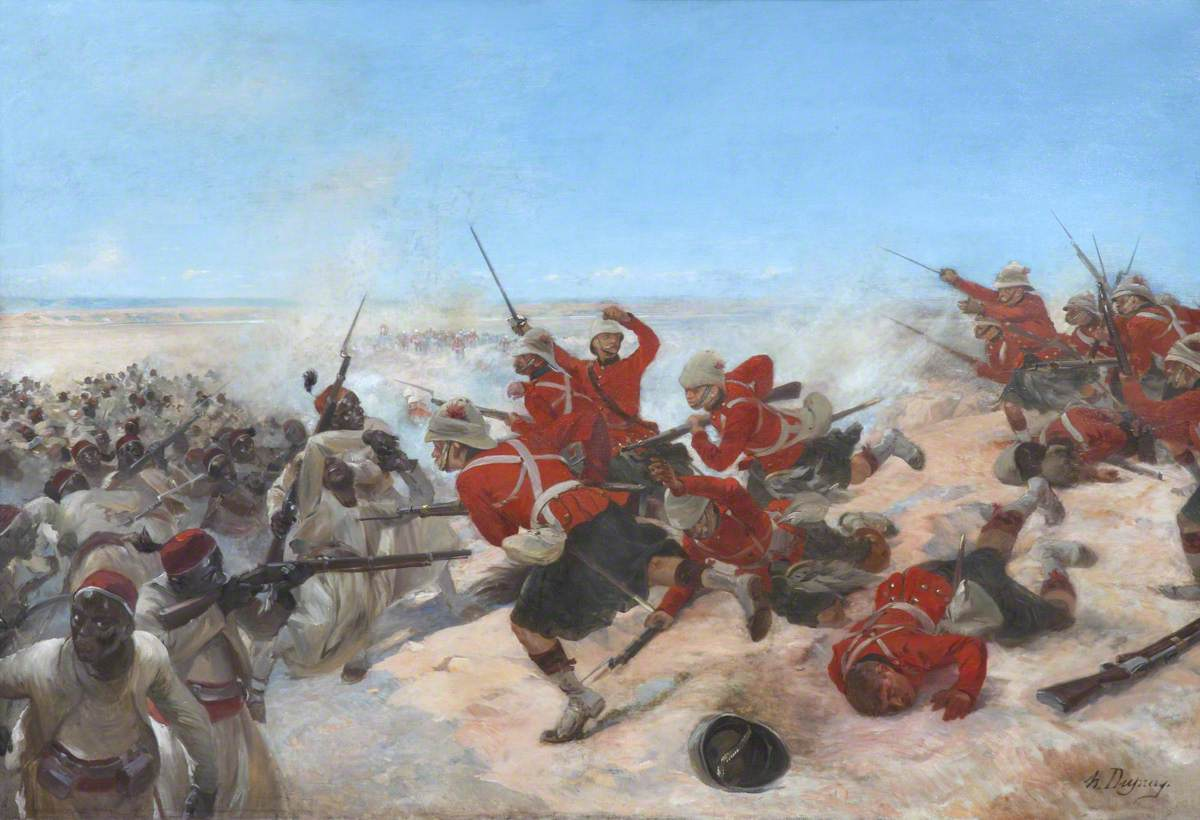
Tell El Kebir by Henri Louis Dupray

'Urabi had redeployed to defend Cairo against Wolseley. His main force dug in at Tel El Kebir, north of the railway and the Sweetwater Canal, both of which linked Cairo to Ismailia on the canal. The defences were hastily prepared, but included trenches and redoubts. Urabi's forces possessed 60 pieces of artillery and breech loading rifles. Wolseley made several personal reconnaissances, and determined that the Egyptians did not man outposts in front of their main defences at night, which made it possible for an attacking force to approach the defences under cover of darkness. Rather than make an outflanking movement around Urabi's entrenchments, which would involve a long march through waterless desert, or undertake formal bombardment and assault, Wolseley planned to approach the position by night and attack frontally at dawn, hoping to achieve surprise.

Wolseley began his advance from Ismailia on the night of 12 September, with two infantry divisions and a cavalry brigade. A brigade of Indian troops covered the flank on the southern bank of the Sweetwater Canal. The approach march of the main forces was made easier because the desert west of Kassassin was almost flat and unobstructed, making it look like a gigantic parade ground. Even though there were repeated halts to maintain dressing and alignment, the British troops reached the Egyptian position at the time Wolseley intended.

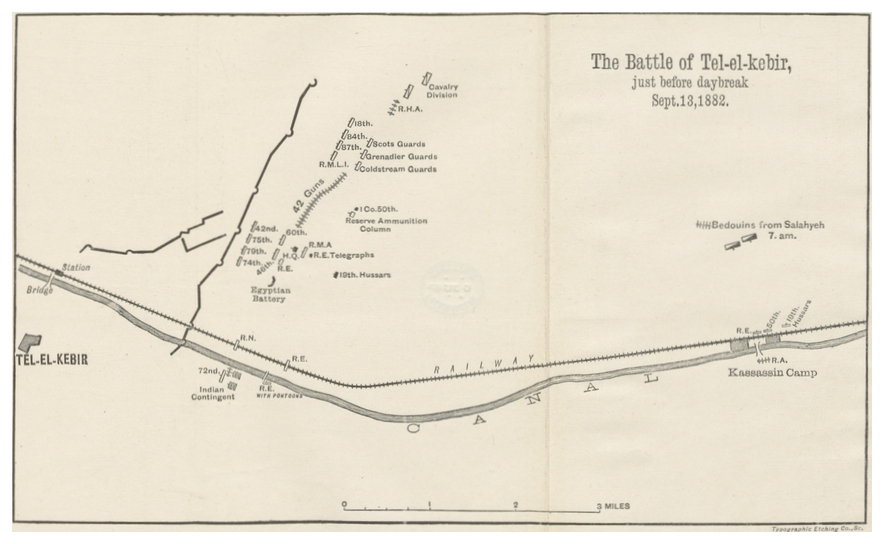
Tell El Kebir

At 5:45 a.m. Wolseley's troops were six hundred yards from the entrenchments and dawn was just breaking, when Egyptian sentries saw them and fired. The first shots were followed by multiple volleys from the entrenchments and by the artillery. British troops, led by the Highland Brigade on the left flank, and the 2nd Brigade on the right flank with the Guards Brigade (commanded by Queen Victoria's third son, Prince Arthur, the Duke of Connaught and Strathearn) in support, charged with the bayonet.

The British advance was shielded from view by the smoke from the Egyptian artillery and rifles. Arriving in the trenches at the same time, all along the line, the resulting battle was over within an hour. Most of the Egyptian soldiers were tired from having stood on the alert all night. Because of the haste with which Urabi's forces had prepared their defences, there were no obstacles in front of them to disrupt the attackers. Several groups stood and fought, mainly the Sudanese troops in the front of the 1st Battalion, of the Blackwatch Regiment, Highland Brigade, but those not overwhelmed in the first rush were forced to retreat. In the end, it was a crushing defeat for the Egyptians. Official British figures gave a total of 57 British troops killed. Approximately two thousand Egyptians died. The British army had more casualties due to heatstroke than enemy action.

British cavalry pursued the broken enemy towards Cairo, which was undefended. Power was then restored to the khedive, the war was at an end and the majority of the British Army went to Alexandria and took ship for home, leaving from November, just an army of occupation.

Lieutenant William Mordaunt Marsh Edwards was awarded a Victoria Cross for his gallantry during the battle. Army surgeon Patrick Murphy was awarded the Egypt Medal and Khedive's Star for his participation in the battle.

== See also ==
- History of Egypt under the British
