= Peter Hobson (cricketer) =

South African cricketer (born 1949)

Personal information
- Full name: Peter Howard Hobson
- Born: 7 June 1949 (age 77); Maseru, Basutoland
- Batting: Right-handed
- Bowling: Right-arm medium

Domestic team information
- Years: Team
- 1970/71: Orange Free State

Career statistics
Competition	First-class
Matches	1
Runs scored	30
Batting average	15.00
100s/50s	0/0
Top score	25
Balls bowled	90
Wickets	0
Bowling average	–
5 wickets in innings	–
10 wickets in match	–
Best bowling	–
Catches/stumpings	0/–
- Source: ESPNCricinfo, 10 September 2015

Peter Howard Hobson (born 7 June 1949) is a former South African cricketer who played a single first-class match for Orange Free State during the 1970–71 season.

Hobson was born in Maseru, in present-day Lesotho (formerly the British colony of Basutoland). He is one of only a small number of first-class cricketers to be born in that country. (Note: Others include Alan Barr, George Boyes, Harry Boyes, Reginald Lagden, Ronald Lagden, Arthur Lewis, and Dennis Piers.) Hobson's sole appearance for Orange Free State came in December 1970, against Border during the 1970–71 season of the Currie Cup. In the match, played at East London's Jan Smuts Ground, he opened the bowling with Michael Jones, taking 0/64 from 15 overs in the first innings. While batting, he came in tenth in the batting order in both innings, scoring five runs in the first and 25 in the second. His team lost by six wickets, having followed on.
