= Alan Barr =

Alan Barr may refer to:

- Alan Barr (footballer) (born 1946), Australian rules footballer
- Alan Barr (cricketer) (1912–1973), South African cricketer

== See also ==
- Allan David Stephen Barr (1930–2018), British engineer
