= Lagden =

Lagden is a surname which may refer to:

- Sir Godfrey Yeatman Lagden (1851–1934), British colonial administrator
- Godfrey William Lagden (1906–1989), British member of parliament
- Reginald Lagden (1893–1944), British businessman and sporting administrator
- Ronald Lagden (1889–1915), English sportsman
