= South Africa Native Affairs Commission =

1903–1905 British colonial commission of inquiry in South Africa

South African Native Affairs Commission
- Abbreviation: SANAC
- Formation: 1903
- Dissolved: 1905
- Type: Colonial commission of inquiry
- Legal status: Defunct
- Purpose: To investigate African affairs and recommend a common "native policy" for the British South African colonies
- Headquarters: Cape Town
- Region served: Cape Colony, Natal, Transvaal, Orange River Colony and Rhodesia
- Chairman: Sir Godfrey Lagden
- Main organ: Report of the South African Native Affairs Commission (1905, 5 vols.)
- Parent organization: Office of the High Commissioner for Southern Africa

The South African Native Affairs Commission (SANAC), often called the Lagden Commission after its chairman, Sir Godfrey Lagden, was a commission of inquiry appointed in 1903 by the British High Commissioner for Southern Africa, Lord Milner, to investigate the condition and administration of the African population of the British South African colonies and to recommend a common, region-wide "native policy". It sat between 1903 and 1905, taking evidence across the Cape Colony, Natal, the Transvaal and the Orange River Colony, as well as in Rhodesia, Bechuanaland and Basutoland, and published its findings in a five-volume report in 1905.

The commission's report is widely regarded by historians as the first comprehensive statement of a policy of territorial racial segregation in South Africa. Among other measures it recommended the permanent separation of Africans and whites in landownership, the restriction of African land purchase to defined reserves, separate political representation so that African voters could not outnumber white voters, the confinement of urban Africans to segregated "locations", and an emphasis on industrial rather than academic education for Africans. Its recommendations influenced subsequent segregationist legislation, including the Natives' Land Act, 1913 and the Natives (Urban Areas) Act, 1923, and are seen as anticipating the framework later elaborated under apartheid.

== Background ==
After the Second Boer War (1899–1902), the British administration under Lord Milner set about reconstructing the four South African colonies in preparation for an eventual union. Each colony had developed its own laws and practices governing its African population, ranging from the non-racial qualified franchise of the Cape Colony to the exclusion of Africans from political rights in the former Boer republics. Milner regarded these divergent traditions as an obstacle to unification and sought a uniform "native policy". Under Article 8 of the 1902 Treaty of Vereeniging, the question of an African franchise in the conquered territories had been deferred until after the grant of self-government, effectively leaving the matter to future white electorates.

The commission arose from the drive for inter-colonial co-operation that followed the war. It was charged with gathering accurate information on African affairs and administration and with offering recommendations to the several governments "with the object of arriving at a common understanding on questions of Native policy".

== Appointment and terms of reference ==
Milner appointed the commission in 1903 and named as its chairman Sir Godfrey Lagden, a colonial administrator who had served as Resident Commissioner of Basutoland. Its terms of reference directed it to inquire into the "status and condition of the Natives", the lines along which their advancement should proceed, and matters including education, land tenure, native law and administration, marriage, industrial training and labour.

== Composition ==
The commission was chaired by Lagden and drew its members from each of the participating colonies and territories. Most were English-speaking colonial officials or politicians regarded at the time as holding "progressive" views on native affairs.

Members of the commission
Colony / territory	Member
Cape Colony	Colonel Walter E. M. Stanford
Cape Colony	Francis Robert ("Matabele") Thompson
Natal	Samuel Olaf Samuelson
Natal	Marshall Campbell
Orange River Colony	Captain John Quayle Dickson
Orange River Colony	Johan Bestendig de la Harpe
Transvaal	Johannes Christoffel Krogh
Transvaal	James Alexander Hamilton
Rhodesia	Sir Thomas C. Scanlen
Basutoland	Herbert C. Sloley

The commission also included Henry Melville Taberer and Godfrey Archibald Godley.

== Proceedings ==
Between 1903 and 1905 the commission travelled widely, taking oral and written evidence from colonial officials, settlers, missionaries and a number of Africans across the four colonies and the neighbouring territories of Rhodesia, Bechuanaland and Basutoland. African witnesses included the editor and political figure John Tengo Jabavu and Josiah Tshangana Gumede, later a president of the African National Congress. The evidence and report were issued in five volumes: the report and annexures (Vol. I), evidence taken in the Cape Colony (Vol. II), evidence taken in Natal (Vol. III), evidence taken in the other territories (Vol. IV), and an index with written replies and memoranda by witnesses (Vol. V).

== Report and recommendations ==
The report was published in 1905. Its central recommendation was that Africans and whites should be kept permanently separate in both landownership and politics.

On land, it proposed that territory be demarcated into separate African and white areas "with a view to finality", that African landholding be concentrated in defined reserves, and that the purchase of land by Africans outside designated areas be restricted—a principle later embodied in the Natives' Land Act, 1913.

On the franchise, it recommended that African political representation be placed on a basis separate from that of whites, so that African voters could not outnumber whites on a common roll, while ultimate political power remained in white hands.

On urban areas, it advocated systematic segregation through the creation of separate "locations" for Africans living in towns and the removal of African "squatters" from white-owned farms.

On education and administration, it favoured industrial and manual training for Africans rather than an academic ("literary") education, emphasised the role of Christian missions, and made recommendations on native law, administration and marriage.

== Reception ==
The report shaped white political opinion across the colonies, and segregation subsequently became a recurring theme in colonial and Union legislation. African political organisations protested at the direction of policy. Lagden himself was dismissive of African political aspirations: responding to a Transvaal petition signed by 46 chiefs and some 25,700 other Africans, he characterised it as having been "rapidly engineered by a few half-educated natives" connected with African newspapers, and said it could not be taken to represent Africans in general.

== Legacy ==
Historians regard SANAC as a foundational moment in the development of South African segregation. Its report has been described as a blueprint that transformed segregationist practices long common across southern Africa into an explicit, countrywide political doctrine. It is widely treated as a precursor to the Natives' Land Act, 1913, the Natives (Urban Areas) Act, 1923 and, ultimately, the Group Areas Act of 1950.

Early accounts of native policy, such as that of Edgar Brookes (1924), already treated the commission as a turning point. Later scholars including Saul Dubow have situated SANAC at the start of the segregationist ideology elaborated in the decades before apartheid, noting that Lagden drew on the reserve model of Basutoland—a precedent also invoked by contemporary segregation advocates such as Howard Pim. Studies of urban policy have traced the "location" system endorsed by the commission to earlier sanitary and administrative measures in the Cape and Natal.

== Publication and archives ==
The report and evidence were printed by the Cape Times in Cape Town in five volumes (1905). The full text is available through the Internet Archive and other digital libraries. Lagden's own presentation set is held by Cambridge University Library, which, together with the University of Cape Town's Five Hundred Year Archive, digitised the volumes in 2023.

== See also ==
- Natives' Land Act, 1913
- Natives (Urban Areas) Act, 1923
- Racial segregation
- Union of South Africa
- Apartheid
