= Ismaïlia Canal =

Waterway in Egypt

Ismailia Canal
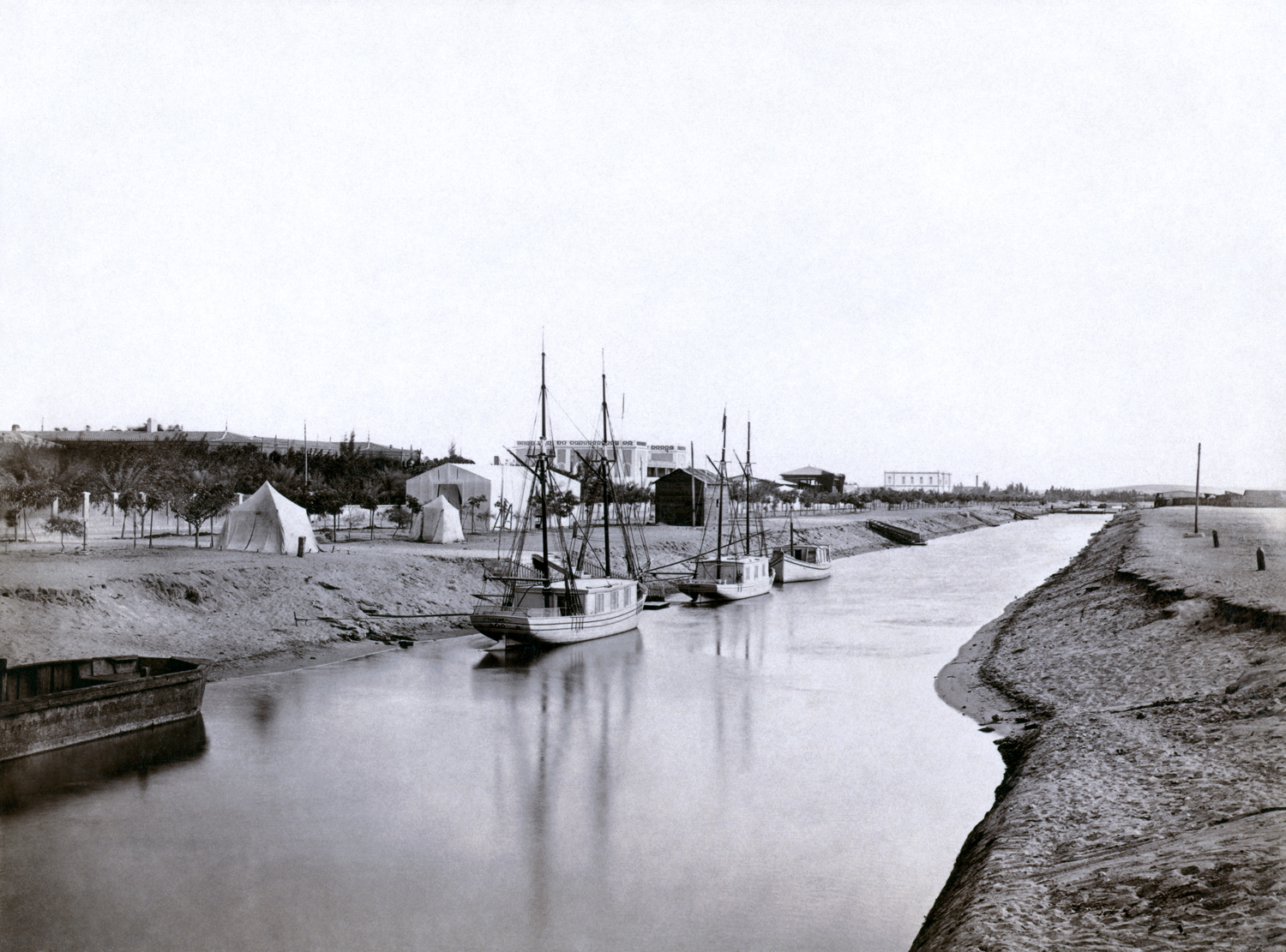
- Interactive map of Ismailia Canal

Specifications
- Status: Open

History
- Construction began: 1861
- Date completed: 1863

Geography
- Direction: East-West
- Start point: Zagazig (Nile)
- End point: Ismalia (Lake Timsah)
- Beginning coordinates: 30°6′18″N 31°14′30″E
- Ending coordinates: 30°35′21″N 32°17′0″E
- Branches: Al-Suways al-Ḥulwah Canal (Ismalia to Suez); Al-ʿAbbāsiyyah Canal (Ismalia to Port Said)

Ismailia Canal or the Al-Ismāʿīliyyah Canal, formerly known as the Sweet Water Canal or the Fresh Water Canal, is a canal which was dug by thousands of Egyptian fellahin to facilitate the construction of the Suez Canal. The canal travels east-west across Ismailia Governorate.

It was dug to provide fresh water to the arid area, from Lake Timsah to Suez and Port Said. The canal facilitated the growth of agricultural settlements along the Suez Canal, and it is particularly important for supplying water to the city of Port Said. Like the Suez Canal, it was designed by French engineers; construction lasted from 1861 until 1863. It runs through the now-dry distributary of the Wadi Tumilat, incorporating portions of an ancient Suez Canal that existed between Old Cairo and the Red Sea.

The Ismailia Canal proper ends at Ismalia. Additional branches connect the canal from Ismailia to Suez and Port Said. The Sweet Water Canal refers to a combination of the Ismailia Canal and its southern branch to Suez.

== Construction ==
In February 1862, after thousands of workers excavated 1.1 million cubic meters, the canal reached Lake Timsah. As soon as the fresh water reached the area, more labourers were hired for the Suez Canal construction project. The canal also allowed for the easy transportation of materials and food with ferries traveling along its narrow ways.

== Battle of Kassassin Lock ==
The Battle of Kassassin Lock was fought near Sweet Water Canal, on August 28, 1882.

== Anglo-Egyptian War ==
Less than 100 years later, the canal no longer provided clean, fresh water but was disturbingly polluted. During the 1950s when British soldiers were stationed in the area, some referred to the canal as an open sewer. Royal Air Force personnel were advised to avoid contact with the water and were warned that the canal was where deserters would end up. When the war became especially bloody, between national, Egyptian, resistance movements and British soldiers, from October 1951 to January 1952, the remains of some of the British soldiers who were tortured and killed, ended up in the canal.

== Present day ==
The Ismalia Canal remains the main source of drinking and irrigation water for many cities in the 21st century. According to a 2014 study, its water quality is excellent for irrigation, and ranges from good to poor for drinking. Pollution nowadays is mainly a combination of upstream Nile discharge, treated drainage into the canal, and seepage from trash.

== See also ==
- Tell El Kabir
- Khalij (Cairo)
