= Suez inscriptions of Darius the Great =

Achaemenid inscriptions in Egypt

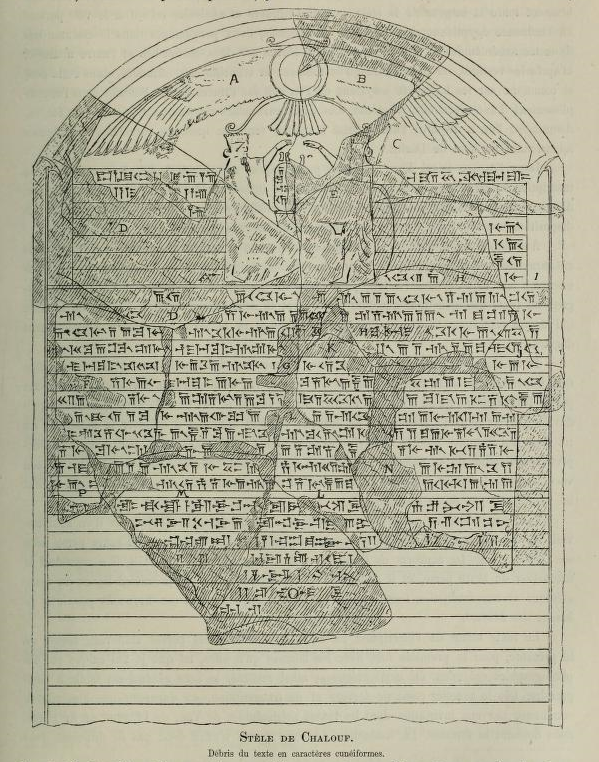
Drawing of the damaged Shaluf Stela

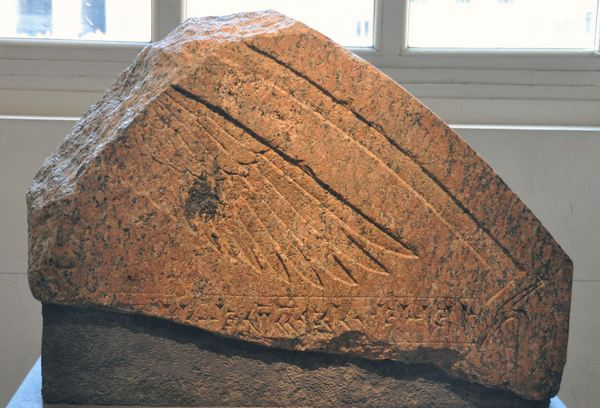
Fragment of the Shaluf Stela, Louvre Museum.

The Suez inscriptions of Darius the Great were texts written in Old Persian, Elamite, Babylonian and Egyptian on five monuments erected in Wadi Tumilat, commemorating the opening of the "Canal of the Pharaohs" between the Nile and the Bitter Lakes.

One of the best preserved of these monuments was a stele of pink granite, which was discovered by Charles de Lesseps, Ferdinand de Lesseps's son, in 1866, 30 kilometres from Suez near Kabret in Egypt. It was erected by Darius the Great, king of the Achaemenid Empire (or Persia), whose reign lasted from 522 to 486 BCE. The monument, also known as the Chalouf stele (alt. Shaluf Stele), records the construction of a forerunner of the modern Suez Canal by the Persians, a canal through Wadi Tumilat, connecting the easternmost, Bubastite, branch of the Nile with Lake Timsah, which was connected to the Red Sea by natural waterways. The stated purpose of the canal was the creation of a shipping connection between the Nile and the Red Sea, between Egypt and Persia.

== Text ==
Partial transliteration and translation of the inscription:

- Transliteration of the Old Persian text:

ϑātiy : Dārayavauš : XŠ : adam : Pārsa : amiy : hacā : Pārsā : Mudrāyam : agarbāyam : adam : niyaštāyam : imām : yauviyām : katanaiy : hacā : Pirāva : nāma : rauta : tya : Mudrāyaiy : danuvatiy : abiy : draya : tya : hacā : Pārsā : aitiy : pasāva : iyam : yauviyā : akaniya : avaϑā : yaϑā : adam : niyaštāyam : utā : nāva : āyatā : hacā : Mudrāyā : tara : imām : yauviyām : abiy : Pārsam : avaϑā : yaϑā : mām : kāma : āha

- English translation:

"King Darius says: I am a Persian; setting out from Persia I conquered Egypt. I ordered to dig this canal from the river that is called Nile and flows in Egypt, to the sea that begins in Persia. Therefore, when this canal had been dug as I had ordered, ships went from Egypt through this canal to Persia, as I had intended."

== See also ==
- History of Achaemenid Egypt
- List of Iranian artifacts abroad
