= Governor Porter =

Governor Porter may refer to:

- Albert G. Porter (1824–1897), 19th Governor of Indiana
- David R. Porter (1788–1867), 9th Governor of Pennsylvania
- George Bryan Porter (1791–1834), Territorial Governor of Michigan from 1831 to 1834
- James D. Porter (1828–1912), 20th Governor of Tennessee
- Ludovic Charles Porter (1869–1928), Acting Governor of the United Provinces in 1922
- Neale Porter (fl. 1860s–1890s), Chief Magistrate of Anguilla from 1869 to 1871
