= Al Isma'iliyah =

Al Isma'iliyah may refer to:

- Ismaïlia, Egypt
- Ismailia Governorate, Egypt

== See also ==
- Isma'ilism
