= George Boyes =

South African cricketer

Personal information
- Full name: George Wroughton Boyes
- Born: 9 September 1910; Maseru, Basutoland
- Died: 19 May 1986 (aged 75); Pietermaritzburg, Natal, South Africa
- Batting: Right-handed
- Relatives: Harry Boyes (brother)

Domestic team information
- Years: Team
- 1939/40: Natal

Career statistics
Competition	First-class
Matches	1
Runs scored	9
Batting average	9.00
100s/50s	0/0
Top score	6*
Catches/stumpings	0/–
- Source: CricketArchive, 10 September 2015

George Wroughton Boyes (9 September 1910 – 19 May 1986) was a South African cricketer who played a single first-class match for Natal during the 1939–40 season. He was a right-handed middle-order batsman.

Boyes was the younger brother of Harry Boyes, who also played first-class cricket for Natal. The brothers were both born in Maseru in what is now Lesotho (previously part of the British colony of Basutoland). They represent two of only a handful of first-class cricketers to be born in that country. (Note: Others include Alan Barr, Peter Hobson, Reginald Lagden, Ronald Lagden, Arthur Lewis, and Dennis Piers.) George Boyes played his only match for Natal in December 1939, against Orange Free State in Bloemfontein. He made three runs in the first innings and six not out in the second, and was in the middle when the winning runs were hit. The match was not part of the Currie Cup, which was not being contested during the 1939–40 season. Boyes died in Pietermaritzburg in 1986, aged 75.
