= Harry Boyes (cricketer) =

South African cricketer

Personal information
- Full name: Harry Edward Boyes
- Born: 17 March 1908; Maseru, Basutoland
- Died: 21 June 1979 (aged 71); Pietermaritzburg, Natal, South Africa
- Relatives: George Boyes (brother)

Domestic team information
- Years: Team
- 1929/30: Natal

Career statistics
Competition	First-class
Matches	1
Runs scored	11
Batting average	5.50
100s/50s	0/0
Top score	6
Catches/stumpings	0/–
- Source: CricketArchive, 10 September 2015

Harry Edward Boyes (17 March 1908 – 21 June 1979) was a South African cricketer who played a single first-class match for Natal during the 1929–30 season.

Boyes was the younger brother of George Wroughton Boyes, who also played first-class cricket for Natal. The brothers were both born in Maseru, in present-day Lesotho (formerly part of the British colony of Basutoland). They represent two of only a handful of first-class cricketers to be born in that country. (Note: Others include Alan Barr, Peter Hobson, Reginald Lagden, Ronald Lagden, Arthur Lewis, and Dennis Piers.) Harry Boyes played his only match for Natal in December 1939, against Border in Queenstown. A middle-order batsman, he made five runs in the first innings and six in the second. Three other players – John Beveridge, Cecil Warner, and Murray Whitehead – were also making their first-class debuts in the match, which was part of 1929–30 season of the Currie Cup. Boyes died in Pietermaritzburg in 1979, aged 71.
