= Claude Reignier Conder =

British Army officer, explorer and antiquarian (1848–1910)

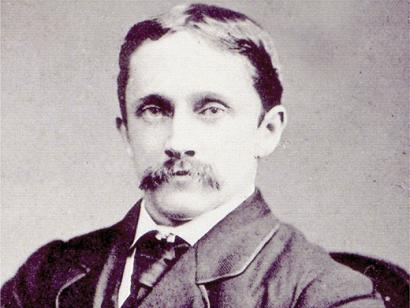
- Born: 29 December 1848; Cheltenham, England
- Died: 16 February 1910 (aged 61); Cheltenham, England

Claude Reignier Conder (29 December 1848 – 16 February 1910) was a British Army officer, explorer and antiquarian. He was a great-great-grandson of Louis-François Roubiliac and grandson of editor and author Josiah Conder.

== Life ==
Conder was educated at University College London and the Royal Military Academy, Woolwich. He became a lieutenant in the Corps of Royal Engineers in 1870. He carried out survey work in Palestine in 1872–1874, latterly in conjunction with Lt Kitchener, later Lord Kitchener, whom he had met at school, and was seconded to the Palestine Exploration Fund from 1875 to 1878 and again in 1881 and 1882, when he was promoted to captain. He retired with the rank of colonel in 1904.

Conder joined the expedition to Egypt in 1882, under Sir Garnet Wolseley, to suppress the rebellion of Urabi Pasha. He was appointed a deputy assistant adjutant and quartermaster-general on the staff of the intelligence department. In Egypt his perfect knowledge of Arabic and of Eastern people proved most useful. He was present at the action of Kassassin, the Battle of Tel el-Kebir, and the advance to Cairo, but then, seized with typhoid fever, he was invalided home. For his services he received the war medal with clasp for Tel el-Kebir, the Khedive's bronze star and the fourth class of the Order of the Medjidie.

While surveying the area of Safed in July 1875, Conder and his party were attacked by local residents and Conder sustained a serious head injury which left him bedridden for a while and unable to return to Palestine. The work of surveying the country of Palestine commenced again only in late February 1877, without Conder.

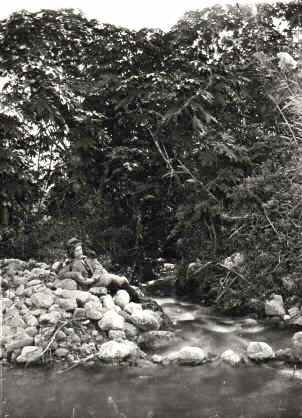
Claude Reignier Conder

In recent years Conder's reputation have been linked to the notorious Jack the Ripper in 1888 London, England. The suggestion is as a Middle East military colleague of Sir Charles Warren, Conder perpetrated the Ripper murders while attempting to retrieve ill-gotten antiquities. The conjecture is specious and not supported by other researchers.

== Publications ==
- 1878: Tent Work in Palestine ISBN 1-4179-2238-9
- 1879: Judas Maccabæus, and the Jewish War of Independence
- 1880: Memoires: The Survey of Western and Eastern Palestine ISBN 1-85207-835-9
- 1883: Heth and Moab, Explorations in Syria in 1881 and 1882
- 1886: Syrian Stone-lore, Or, The Monumental History of Palestine
- 1887: Altaic Hieroglyphs and Hittite Inscriptions ISBN 1-4326-0939-4
- 1889: Palestine
- 1889: The Survey of Eastern Palestine, Memoirs of the Topography, Orography, Hydrography, Archaeology, Etc.
- 1893: The Tell Amarna Tablets
- 1896: The Bible and the East
- 1897: The Latin Kingdom of Jerusalem
- 1898: The Hittites and their Language
- 1900: The Hebrew Tragedy
- 1902: The First Bible
- 1909: The City of Jerusalem

== Books (with online access) ==
- Conder, Claude Reignier (1879) Tent Work in Palestine, vol 1
- Conder, Claude Reignier (1879) Tent Work in Palestine, vol 2
- Conder, C.R.; Kitchener, H.H. (1881). The Survey of Western Palestine: memoirs of the topography, orography, hydrography, and archaeology. Vol. 1. London: Committee of the Palestine Exploration Fund. OCLC 5785377. (The full text, archive.org, Can download PDF)
- Conder, C.R.; Kitchener, H.H. (1881). The Survey of Western Palestine: memoirs of the topography, orography, hydrography, and archaeology. Vol. 2. London: Committee of the Palestine Exploration Fund. OCLC 5785377. (The full text, archive.org, Can download PDF)
- Conder, Claude Reignier and H.H. Kitchener (1881): The Survey of Western Palestine: memoirs of the topography, orography, hydrography, and archaeology. London:Committee of the Palestine Exploration Fund. vol 3 The full text, archive.org, Can download PDF.
- Conder, C.R.; Warren, C. (1884). Jerusalem. London: Committee of the Palestine Exploration Fund. OCLC 5785377.
- Conder, Claude Reignier (1885), Heth and Moab : explorations in Syria in 1882
- Conder, Claude Reignier (1887), Altaic Hieroglyphs and Hittite Inscriptions
- Conder, C.R. (1889). Syrian Stone-lore; or, The Monumental History of Palestine. London: Alexander P. Watt. OCLC 751757461.
- Conder, Claude Reignier (1889), Altaic Hieroglyphs and Hittite Inscriptions

== Articles (with online access) ==
- Conder, C.R. (1909). "Notes on New Discoveries" (PDF). Palestine Exploration Fund Quarterly Statement. 41 (4). Palestine Exploration Fund: 266–275. doi:10.1179/peq.1909.41.4.266.
- Conder, C.R. (1910). "Recent Hittite Discoveries" (PDF). Palestine Exploration Fund Quarterly Statement. 42 (1). Palestine Exploration Fund: 42–53. doi:10.1179/peq.1910.42.1.42.
- Conder, C.R. (1910). "Notes and Queries" (PDF). Palestine Exploration Fund Quarterly Statement. 42 (1). Palestine Exploration Fund: 78–80. doi:10.1179/peq.1910.42.1.78.
