= Dennis Piers =

South African cricketer

Personal information
- Full name: Dennis Walter Piers
- Born: 10 May 1929; Leribe, Basutoland
- Died: 9 September 2005 (aged 76); Randburg, Gauteng, South Africa

Domestic team information
- Years: Team
- 1947/48: Orange Free State

Career statistics
Competition	First-class
Matches	2
Runs scored	41
Batting average	10.25
100s/50s	0/0
Top score	24
Catches/stumpings	0/–
- Source: CricketArchive, 10 September 2015

Dennis Walter Piers (10 May 1929 – 9 September 2005) was a South African cricketer who played two first-class matches for Orange Free State during the 1947–48 season.

Piers was born in Leribe (or Hlotse), in what is now Lesotho (previously part of the British colony of Basutoland). He is one of only a handful of first-class cricketers to be born in that country. (Note: Others include Alan Barr, George Boyes, Harry Boyes, Reginald Lagden, Ronald Lagden, and Arthur Lewis.) Both of Piers' matches for Orange Free State came in March 1948, towards the end of that season's Currie Cup. On debut against Western Province, he scored 24 and 6, while in the next match, against Eastern Province, he scored a duck in the first innings and 11 run in the second. In all four of his innings, he came in ninth in the batting order. Despite making his debut at the age of 17, Piers played no further matches for Orange Free State. He died in Randburg, a suburb of Johannesburg, in September 2005, aged 76.
