= Alan Barr (cricketer) =

South African cricketer

Personal information
- Full name: Alan Irvine Barr
- Born: 15 September 1912; Quthing, Basutoland
- Died: 30 October 1973 (aged 61); Ficksburg, Orange Free State, South Africa

Domestic team information
- Years: Team
- 1929/30–1937/38: Orange Free State

Career statistics
Competition	First-class
Matches	9
Runs scored	233
Batting average	14.56
100s/50s	0/0
Top score	43
Catches/stumpings	2/–
- Source: CricketArchive, 10 September 2015

Alan Irvine Barr (15 September 1912 – 30 October 1973) was a South African cricketer who played nine first-class matches for Orange Free State from 1930 to 1937.

Barr was born in Quthing, in what is now Lesotho (previously part of the British colony of Basutoland). He is one of only a handful of first-class cricketers to be born in that country. (Note: Others include George Boyes, Harry Boyes, Peter Hobson, Reginald Lagden, Ronald Lagden, Arthur Lewis, and Dennis Piers.) Barr made his first-class debut at 17, playing against Natal during the 1929–30 season of the Currie Cup. He continued making regular appearances for Orange Free State until the 1937–38 season, but never played more than two matches in a single season. Barr's highest first-class score was an innings of 43 against Eastern Province in February 1937, made from third in the batting order. He finished his career with a batting average of only 14.56, and never bowled at first-class level. Barr died in October 1973 in Ficksburg, which lies on the border between Lesotho and Orange Free State Province.
