= Abu Suwir El Mahata =

Abu Suwir El Mahata أبو صوير المحطة
- Town
- Location in Egypt
- Coordinates: 30.563268°N 32.115535°E
- Country: Egypt
- Governorate: Ismailia

Area
  - Total: 49.2 km^{2} (19.0 sq mi)

Population (2023)
  - Total: 34,358
  - Density: 698/km^{2} (1,810/sq mi)
- Time zone: UTC+2 (EET)
  - Summer (DST): UTC+3 (EEST)

Abu Suwir El Mahata (Arabic: أبو صوير المحطة), also called Abu Suweir, is a town in the Ismailia Governorate, Egypt. Its population was estimated at 34,358 people in 2023.
