= Kassassin =

Place in Ismailia, Egypt, site of battle

Kassassin القصاصين
- Town
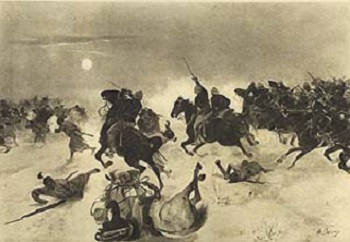
- Charge at Kassassin

- Location in Egypt
- Coordinates: 30°34′N 31°56′E
- Country: Egypt
- Governorate: Ismailia

Area
  - Total: 13.8 km^{2} (5.3 sq mi)

Population (2023)
  - Total: 25,551
  - Density: 1,850/km^{2} (4,800/sq mi)
- Time zone: UTC+2 (EET)
  - Summer (DST): UTC+3 (EEST)

Kassassin (Arabic: القصاصين) is a town in Lower Egypt 22 miles (35 km) by rail west of Ismailia, a major city on the Suez Canal.

== Battle of Kassassin ==
The Battle of Kassassin was fought at the Sweet Water Canal, when on August 28, 1882, the British force was attacked by the Egyptians, led by Amed Urabi Pasha. They needed to carve a passage through Ismailia and the cultivated Delta. Both attacks were repulsed. The Household Cavalry under the command of General Drury Drury-Lowe led the "Moonlight Charge", consisting of the Royal Horse Guards and 7th Dragoon Guards galloping at full tilt into enemy rifle fire. Their ranks were whittled down from the saddle, but still they charged headlong, ever forward. Sir Baker Russell commanded 7th on the right; whereas the Household was led by Colonel Ewart, c/o of the Life Guards. They captured 11 Egyptian guns. Despite only half a dozen casualties, Wolseley was so concerned about the quality of his men that he wrote Cambridge for reforms to recruiting. Nonetheless, these were the elite of the British army and, these skirmishes were costly. Legend and a poem "At Kassassin", say the battle began as it was getting dark.

On September 9, Urabi seized what he considered his last chance to attack the British position. A fierce battle ensued on the railway line at 7 am. General Willis sallied out from emplacements to drive back the Egyptians, who at 12 pm returned to their trenches. Thereupon Sir Garnet Wolseley arrived with the main force, while the Household Cavalry guarded his flank from a force at Salanieh. A total force of 634 officers and 16,767 NCOs and men were stationed at Kassassin before they marched on September 13, 1882, towards the main objective at Tell El Kebir where another battle was fought, the Battle of Tell El Kebir.

== Battle immortalized in poetry ==
The battle as described in the poem by Arthur Clark Kennedy, At Kassassin, mentions the battle began as the day turned to evening.

AT KASSASSIN

RAINED on all day by the sun,
Beating through helmet and head,
Through to the brain.
Inactive, no water, no bread,
We had stood on the desolate plain
Till evening shades drew on amain;
And we thought that our day's work was done,
When, lo! it had only begun.

'Charge!' And away through the night,
Toward the red flashes of light
Spurting in fire on our sight,
Swifter and swifter we sped.
'Charge!' At that word of command,
On through the loose-holding sand,
On through the hot, folding sand,
Through hailstorms of iron and lead,
Swifter and swifter we sped.

Thud! fell a friend at my hand;
No halt, ne'er a stay, nor a stand.
What though a comrade fell dead?
Swifter and swifter we sped.

Only the red, flashing light
Guided our purpose aright;
For night was upon us, around,
Deceptive in sight as in sound.
We knew not the enemy's ground,
We knew not his force;
But on, gaining pace at each bound,
Flew man and horse.

Burst on the enemy's flank,
On through his gunners and guns,
Swifter and swifter we sped;
Over each bayonet-ranged rank,
Earthward their dusky waves sank,
Scattered and fled.
They ran as a startled flock runs;
But still we pursued o'er the plain,
Till the rising moon counted the slain,
And some hundred Egyptians lay dead.

Oh! 'twas a glorious ride,
And I rode on the crest of the tide.
We dashed them aside like the mud of the street,
We threshed them away like the chaff from the
wheat,
We trod out their victory under our feet,
And charged them again and again;
For demons were loose on the hot-breathing wind,
And entered the souls of our men.
A feverish delight filled our bones,
Heightened by curses and groans—
The mind taking hold of the body, the body react-
ing on mind.

Ha! 'twas a glorious ride,
Though I miss an old friend from my side,
And sadness is mingled with pride.
Still, 'twas a glorious ride—
That race through the darkness, the straining, the
shock,
The struggle, and slaughter by Kassassin lock.
