= Arthur Lewis (English cricketer) =

English cricketer

Personal information
- Full name: Arthur Hamilton Lewis
- Born: 16 September 1901; Maseru, Basutoland
- Died: 23 August 1980 (aged 78); Heavitree, Devon, England
- Batting: Right-handed

Domestic team information
- Years: Team
- 1929: Hampshire
- 1931–1937: Berkshire

Career statistics
Competition	First-class
Matches	1
Runs scored	20
Batting average	20.00
100s/50s	–/–
Top score	20
Catches/stumpings	1/–
- Source: Cricinfo, 6 January 2010

Arthur Hamilton Lewis (16 September 1901 — 23 August 1980) was an English cricketer who represented Hampshire in first-class cricket and Berkshire in minor counties cricket.

Lewis was born in Maseru in what is now Lesotho (previously part of the British colony of Basutoland). He is one of only a few first-class cricketers to be born in that country. (Note: Others include Alan Barr, George Boyes, Harry Boyes, Reginald Lagden, Ronald Lagden, and Dennis Piers.) He was educated on the Isle of Man, before matriculating to Jesus College, Cambridge. After graduating from Cambridge, he became an assistant master at Wellington College, Berkshire. Lewis made a single appearance in first-class cricket for Hampshire against Surrey at The Oval in the 1929 County Championship. Opening the batting alongside George Brown in Hampshire's first and only innings, he was dismissed for 20 runs by Alan Peach. Between 1931 and 1937, Lewis played minor counties cricket for Berkshire, making 35 appearances in the Minor Counties Championship. Outside of county cricket, he was known for his remarkable scoring feats in club cricket. He was described by Wisden as being a "cross-bat hitter with a wonderful eye and a magnificent cover-point".

Lewis married Mary Perceval Newhouse, the daughter of a clergyman, in August 1930. He died in August 1980 in Heavitree, Devon.
