= 1894 New Year Honours =

Appointments by Queen Victoria

The 1894 New Year Honours were appointments by Queen Victoria to various orders and honours to reward and highlight good works by members of the British Empire. They were published in The Times on 1 January 1984 and in The London Gazette on 2 January 1894.

The recipients of honours are displayed here as they were styled before their new honour, and arranged by honour, with classes (Knight, Knight Grand Cross, etc.) and then divisions (Military, Civil, etc.) as appropriate.

== Baronetcies ==
- Leonard Lyell MP
- Theodore Fry MP

== Knighthoods ==
- Thomas Roe MP
- Donald Horne Macfarlane MP
- Robert Hunter, Solicitor to the Post Office.

Colonial list

- Fielding Clarke, Chief Justice of Hong Kong
- John Winfield Bonser, Chief Justice of Ceylon
- Hartley Williams, Senior Puisne Judge of the Supreme Court of Victoria
- William Patrick Manning, Mayor of Sydney

== Victoria Cross (VC) ==
- Surgeon-Major Owen Edward Pennefather Lloyd

== Order of the Bath ==
=== Knights Grand Cross (GCB) ===
Civil division

- Abdul Rahman Khan, Amir of Afghanistan GCSI

=== Knights Commander (KCB) ===
Civil division

- Sir Thomas Henry Sanderson KCMG CB Assistant Under Secretary of State, Foreign Office.
- The Hon. Robert Meade CB Permanent Under-Secretary of State for the Colonies

=== Companions (CB) ===
Military division

- Colonel Edmond Roche Elles, Assistant Quartermaster-General (Intelligence Branch), Headquarters India

Civil division

- William James Colville, Colonel in the Army (Retired List)
- Cornelius Neale Dalton CB, Assistant-Secretary to the Local Government Board
- Charles E. Gifford, Secretary to the Commander-in-Chief at Portsmouth
- J. Norman Lockyer FRS, Professor of Astronomy in the Royal College of Science
- William Henry Preece, Engineer-in-Chief to the General Post Office

== Order of the Star of India ==
=== Knights Commander (KCSI) ===
- Sir Henry Mortimer Durand KCIE CSI Secretary to the Government of India in the Foreign Department

=== Companions (CSI) ===
- Richard Udny, Commissioner and Superintendent, Peshawur Division
- Jervoise Athelstane Baines, Member of the Indian Civil Service
- William John Cuningham, Deputy Secretary and Acting Secretary to the Government of India in the Foreign Department
- Thomas Salter Pyne

== Order of the Indian Empire ==
=== Knights Commander (KCIE) ===
- The Maharao Raja of Bundi
- The Maharaja of Karauli
- The Maharaja of Orchha
- Prince Jehan Kader Mirza Bahadur, of Oudh
- Colonel John Charles Ardagh CB CIE Private Secretary to His Excellency the Viceroy
- Colonel Lord William Leslie de la Poer Beresford CIE VC Military Secretary to His Excellency the Viceroy.
- James Lyle Mackay CIE

=== Companions (CIE) ===
- Pherozeshah Merwanji Mehta, Additional Member of the Council of the Governor-General of India
- William Robert Brooke, Director-General of Telegraphs in India
- Paul Gregory Melitus, Deputy Secretary to the Government of India in the Home Department
- Lieutenant-Colonel George Montgomery Moore, RA, Retired, President of the Madras Municipal Commission
- Surgeon-Major Ernest Harrold Fenn
- Major Richard Carnac Temple, Indian Staff Corps.
- Major John William Hogge, Indian Staff Corps
- Edward Claudius Scotney George, Officiating Deputy Commissioner of the Bhamo District
- Robert William Edward Hampe Vincent, Acting Commissioner of Police, Bombay
- Lieutenant Arthur Henry McMahon, Indian Staff Corps.
- Lieutenant John Manners Smith VC Indian Staff Corps
- John Stuart Donald, Assistant-Commissioner, Punjab.
- Rai Bahadur Bankim Chunder Chatterjee.

== Order of St Michael and St George ==
=== Knights Commander ===
- Neale Porter CMG Colonial Secretary of the Island of Jamaica
- Jenkin Coles, Speaker of the House of Assembly of the Colony of South Australia
- Westby Perceval, Agent-General in London for the Colony of New Zealand

=== Companions (CMG) ===
- Captain Edward Henry Meggs Davis RN For services connected with certain islands in the Western Pacific.
- John Edward Tanner MICE late Director of Public Works and General Superintendent of Railways in the Island of Trinidad.
- Frederick William Webb, Clerk of the Legislative Assembly of the Colony of New South Wales
- Godfrey Yeatman Lagden, Government Secretary and Accountant of Basutoland.
- George Edward Yorke Gleadowe, of Her Majesty's Treasury, for services connected with the award of compensation to British Sealers excluded from Behring Sea, under the modus vivendi with the United States of 1891.
- (Honorary) Tungu Mohamed bin Antah, Yam Tuan Besar of Sri Menanti, President of the State Council of the Negri Sembilan Confederated States

== Distinguished Service Order (DSO) ==
- Captain Gordon Napier Caulfeild, Indian Staff Corps
- Captain Hugh Neufville Taylor, Indian Staff Corps
- Lieutenant John Henegan, Indian Staff Corps
