= Canal of the Pharaohs =

Forerunner of the Suez Canal, Egypt

Approximate location of Canal of the Pharaohs

The Canal of the Pharaohs, also called the Ancient Suez Canal or Necho's Canal or Darius Canal, is the forerunner of the Suez Canal, constructed in ancient times and kept in use, with intermissions, until being closed in 767 AD for strategic reasons during a rebellion. It followed a different course from its modern counterpart, by linking the Nile to the Red Sea via the Wadi Tumilat. Work began under the pharaohs. According to Darius the Great's Suez Inscriptions and Herodotus, the first opening of the canal was under Persian king Darius the Great, but later ancient authors like Aristotle, Strabo, and Pliny the Elder claim that he failed to complete the work. Another possibility is that it was finished in the Ptolemaic period under Ptolemy II, when engineers solved the problem of overcoming the difference in height through canal locks.

== Egyptian and Persian works ==
At least as far back as Aristotle there have been suggestions that perhaps as early as the 12th Dynasty, Pharaoh Senusret III (1878–1839 BC), called Sesostris by the Greeks, may have started a canal joining the River Nile with the Red Sea. In his Meteorology, Aristotle wrote:

One of their kings tried to make a canal to it (for it would have been of no little advantage to them for the whole region to have become navigable; Sesostris is said to have been the first of the ancient kings to try), but he found that the sea was higher than the land. So he first, and Darius afterwards, stopped making the canal, lest the sea should mix with the river water and spoil it.

Strabo also wrote that Sesostris started to build a canal, as did Pliny the Elder (see quote further down).

However, the canal was probably first cut or at least begun by Necho II (r. 610–595 BC), in the late 7th century BC, and it was either re-dug or possibly completed by Darius the Great (r. 550–486 BC). Classical sources disagree as to when it was finally completed.

Darius the Great's Suez Inscriptions comprise five Egyptian monuments, including the Chalouf Stele, that commemorate the construction and completion of the canal linking the Nile River with the Red Sea by Darius I of Persia. They were located along the Darius Canal through the valley of Wadi Tumilat and probably recorded sections of the canal as well. In the second half of the 19th century, French cartographers discovered the remnants of the north–south section of Darius Canal past the east side of Lake Timsah and ending near the north end of the Great Bitter Lake.

Pliny the Elder wrote:

165. Next comes the Tyro tribe and, on the Red Sea, the harbour of the Daneoi, from which Sesostris, king of Egypt, intended to carry a ship-canal to where the Nile flows into what is known as the Delta; this is a distance of over 60 miles. Later the Persian king Darius had the same idea, and yet again Ptolemy II, who made a trench 100 feet wide, 30 feet deep and about 35 miles long, as far as the Bitter Lakes.

Although Herodotus (2.158) tells us Darius I completed the canal, Aristotle (Aristot. met. I 14 P 352b.), Strabo (Strab. XVII 1, 25 C 804. 805.), and Pliny the Elder (Plin. n. h. VI 165f.) all say that he failed to complete it, while Diodorus Siculus does not mention a completion of the canal by Necho II.

== Greek, Roman and Islamic works ==
After the death of Alexander the Great, the general Ptolemy gained control of Egypt, declared himself Pharaoh and began the Ptolemaic dynasty. His son, the 2nd leader of that dynasty, Ptolemy II took up the canal work again, but also stopped because of the differences of water level. Diodorus, however, reports that it was completed by Ptolemy II after being fitted with a water lock.

Ptolemy II is credited by some for being the first to solve the problem of keeping the Nile free of salt water when his engineers invented the lock around 274/273 BC.

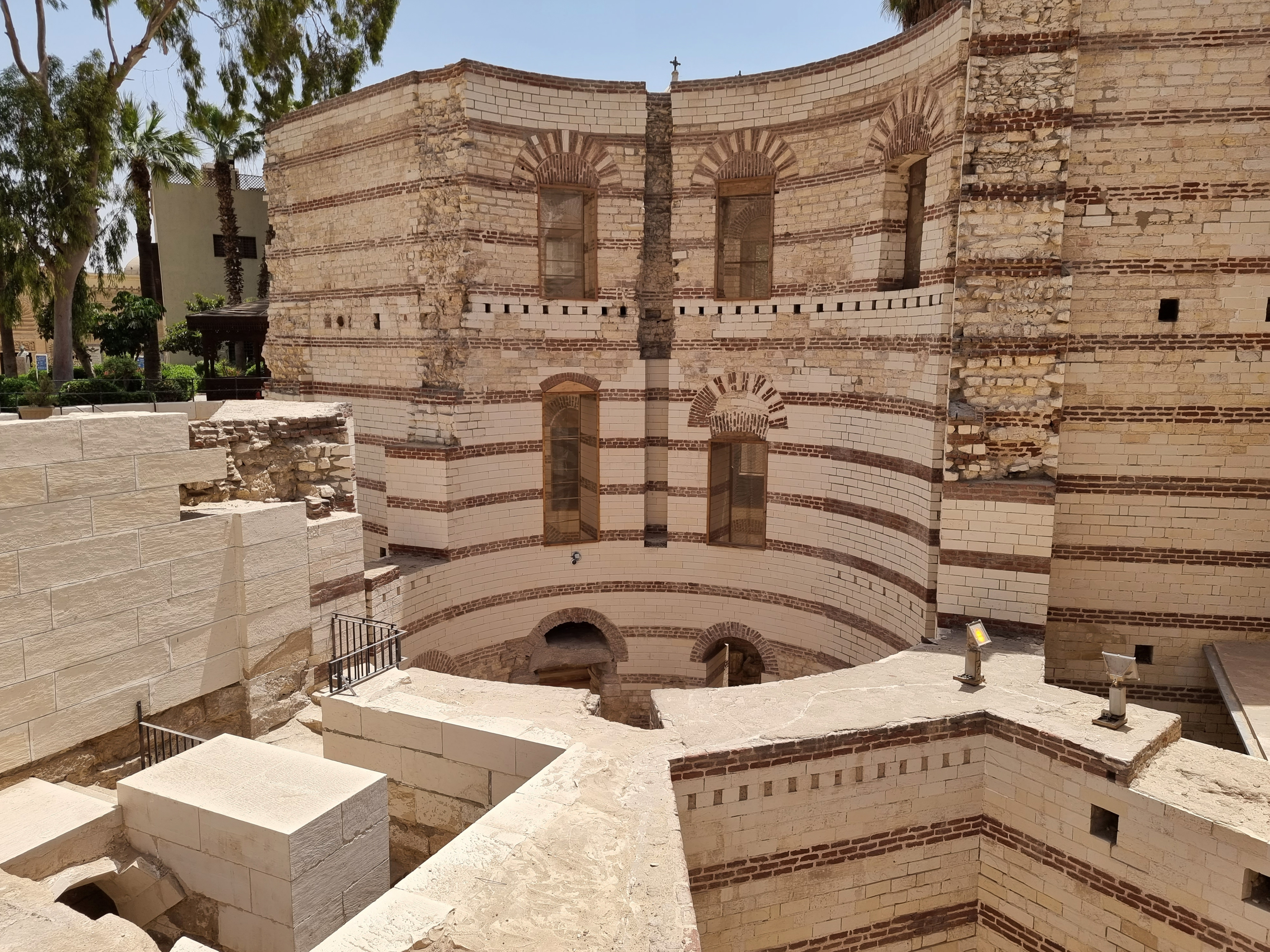
Remains of a large circular tower in the Babylon Fortress (present-day Old Cairo), built by Diocletian in the 3rd century AD to defend the Roman canal's entrance on the Nile

The canal was reconstructed by Roman emperor Trajan, who moved its mouth on the Nile further south to what is now Old Cairo, and named it Amnis Traianus after himself. Remains of the massive stone walls that made up the entrance to Trajan's canal have been found under the present-day Coptic Church of Saint Sergius and the Coptic Church of Saint George. The walls are 6 metres (20 ft) thick and are set 40 metres (130 ft) apart. Where the canal joined the Nile, Trajan constructed a harbor and fortifications, which Diocletian expanded in the 3rd century AD along with the construction of the present Babylon Fortress. In the 2nd century AD, Claudius Ptolemy refers to the canal as the "River of Trajan". Diocletian's fortress enveloped the Nile entrance of the canal and protected it on either side. The canal passed between two massive round towers and then through the middle of the fortress. In later centuries, this entry was blocked with a new wall constructed between the towers.

The canal was difficult to maintain and by the time of the Muslim conquest in 641 AD, it had fallen out of use and into disrepair. Islamic texts discuss the canal, which they say had been silted up, but was reopened in 641 or 642 AD by 'Amr ibn al-'As, the commander of the Muslim army in Egypt. The new canal dug by Amr was excavated further north, joining the Nile close to what is now the Sayyida Zaynab neighbourhood of Cairo. Its connection to the Red Sea remained open until 767, when it was closed to stop supplies reaching Mecca and Medina, which were in rebellion. The canal's remaining section near the Nile, known as the Khalij, continued to serve a local function as part of Cairo's water infrastructure up until the late 1890s, when it was completely filled in and converted into what is now Port Said Street.

== Aftermath ==
Thereafter, the land routes to tranship camel caravans' goods were from Alexandria to ports on the Red Sea or the northern Byzantine silk route through the Caucasus Mountains transhipping on the Caspian Sea and then to India.

Following the discovery of a direct sea route to India via the Cape of Good Hope by Portugal, the Venetians and Mamluks negotiated with each other to fund the construction of a new canal in order to weaken Portuguese trade. However, the Ottoman conquest of Egypt by Selim I and its subsequent annexation ended any hopes for Venice to maintain their trade dominance in the Mediterranean.

Sokollu Mehmed Pasha, the Grand Vizier of the Ottoman Empire from 1565 to 1579, also considered constructing a new canal to reduce Portuguese dominance in the Indian Ocean and connect the divided Ottoman navy in the Mediterranean Sea and the Indian Ocean, but it was deemed too expensive to construct and was cancelled.

During the Egyptian expedition, Napoleon Bonaparte learnt about the canal in 1799 when his surveyor, Jacques-Marie Le Père, discovered the remains of the canal. Napoleon considered rebuilding the canal but ultimately cancelled it.

After over a millennium since its closure in 767, the Suez Canal re-established a direct sea route between the Mediterranean Sea and the Red Sea in 1869.

== See also ==
- Ancient Egyptian trade
- Indo-Mediterranean
