= Neale Porter =

British colonial governor

Sir Neale Porter KCMG (died 1905) was a British colonial administrator. After working as a merchant and insurance agent in London he moved to Birmingham where he was partner in an iron foundry. He served in the Warwickshire Militia and reached the rank of captain before retiring in 1859. Porter moved to the Caribbean where he became president of the council of Anguilla in 1869, he served in various administrative roles there and at Dominica, Montserrat, the British Leeward Islands and Saint Christopher and Nevis. He served as colonial secretary of Jamaica from 1887 until his retirement in 1895.

== Early life and military career ==
Porter was a merchant and insurance agent in St Clement's, Eastcheap, London until 31 December 1852. He afterwards served as an officer in the Warwickshire Militia, being appointed lieutenant on 1 February 1853. Porter was a partner in the spring Hill Works, an iron foundry in Birmingham, until 2 October 1854. He had risen to captain in the militia by 1859 when he resigned his commission.

== Colonial administrator ==
Porter moved to the Caribbean by 1869 when he was appointed president of the Council of the British colony of Anguilla. He served until 1871, in which year he was also acting colonial secretary of the colony. In 1871 he was appointed acting lieutenant-governor of Dominica and served as president of its council in 1872. Porter was appointed president of the council of Montserrat on 13 February 1873 and served in that role for 10 years. He was additionally appointed a member of the Executive Council of the British Leeward Islands on 7 March 1877. Porter was appointed colonial secretary of the British Leeward Islands on 18 April 1883, serving until 1887, during which time he was thrice acting governor. On 20 June 1883 he was appointed to the executive council of Saint Christopher and Nevis, a new union of colonies which included Anguilla.

On 28 September 1887 Porter was appointed colonial secretary of Jamaica, serving in that role until his retirement in 1895. On 24 May 1888 his service was rewarded with appointment as a member of the Order of St Michael and St George; he was advanced to knight commander of the order in the 1894 New Year Honours. Porter was a member of the Oriental Club. In retirement he lived in Kensington, at the time of his death in 1905 he was resident at the Alexandra Hotel in St Leonards-on-Sea in East Sussex.

Preceded by Alexander Augustus Melfort Campbell	Chief Magistrate of Anguilla; 1869-1871	Succeeded by D.S. Lloyd
