= Alan Barr (footballer) =

Former Australian rules footballer

Personal information
- Full name: Alan Barr
- Born: 6 January 1946 (age 80)
- Original team: Birregurra

Playing career^{1}
Years	Club	Games (Goals)
1965 — 1967	Geelong	22 (11)
- ^{1} Playing statistics correct to the end of 1967.

Alan Barr (born 6 January 1946) is a former Australian rules footballer who played for Geelong in the Victorian Football League (now known as the Australian Football League). He played in the 1964 VFL Reserves Premiership and later played for Oakleigh in the VFA.
