= Commission of inquiry =

Commission of inquiry may refer to:

- Public inquiry, a review of events ordered by a government body.
  - Commission of Inquiry (India)
  - Presidential Commission of Inquiry
- Royal commission, a formal public inquiry into a defined issue in some monarchies.
- United Nations commission of inquiry, a United Nations mission carried out with the intention to discover facts.
