= Ronald Lagden =

English sportsman

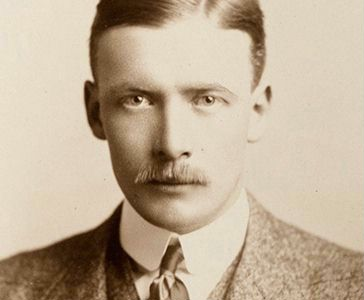

Personal information
- Full name: Ronald Owen Lagden
- Born: 21 November 1889; Maseru, Basutoland
- Died: 1 March 1915 (aged 25); St. Eloi, Belgium
- Batting: Right-handed
- Bowling: Right-arm fast
- Role: All-rounder

Domestic team information
- Years: Team
- 1909–1912: Oxford University

Career statistics
| Competition | First-class |
|---|---|
| Matches | 31 |
| Runs scored | 1,197 |
| Batting average | 25.46 |
| 100s/50s | 0/8 |
| Top score | 99* |
| Balls bowled | 2,729 |
| Wickets | 56 |
| Bowling average | 25.10 |
| 5 wickets in innings | 1 |
| 10 wickets in match | 0 |
| Best bowling | 6/57 |
| Catches/stumpings | 18/– |
- Source: CricketArchive, 16 November 2022

Ronald Owen Lagden (21 November 1889 – 1 March 1915) was an English sportsman who played first-class cricket for Oxford University and represented England at rugby union.

== Early life and family ==
Lagden was born in Maseru in what was then the British colony of Basutoland (now Lesotho). He is one of only a handful of first-class cricketers to be born in that country. (Note: Others include his brother (Reginald Lagden), Alan Barr, George Boyes, Harry Boyes, Arthur Lewis, and Dennis Piers.) Lagden had a younger brother, Reginald, who was a first-class cricketer for Oxford's rivals, Cambridge University, as well as playing with Surrey. Their father, Godfrey, later appeared in a single first-class match for the Marylebone Cricket Club at the age of 54. Ronald Lagden was educated at Marlborough College and Oriel College, Oxford.

== Cricket ==
A right arm fast bowler, Lagden batted in the lower order but often contributed valuable runs. His best innings was 99 not out, which he made in 1912 against H. D. G. Leveson-Gower's XI, missing out on a century when Australian Neville Fraser was adjudged leg before wicket to Ernest Smith for a duck.

Apart from University Matches, Lagden also played against touring international sides, Australia in 1909, India in 1911 and South Africa in 1912. One of his two victims in the match against India was captain Bhupinder Singh of Patiala.

The final time Lagden played with Oxford was at Lord's in July 1912, another University Match. He scored 68 in his final innings and dismissed his brother Reginald as his 56th and last first-class wicket.

== Rugby ==
While at Oxford University, Lagden took part in three Varsity matches. He was capped once for England, in the final match of their 1911 Five Nations Championship campaign, a Calcutta Cup match against Scotland at Twickenham. Lagden, a number eight, kicked two conversions in the 13 to 8 win.

== War ==
In 1914, Lagden joined the King's Royal Rifle Corps and was then attached to the 4th Battalion which were to fight in the Western Front. Just before the Second Battle of Ypres, Captain Lagden was one of 300 soldiers that ventured over the trench walls in an attack on the Germans, but was killed.

== See also ==
- List of cricketers who were killed during military service
- List of international rugby union players killed in action during the First World War
