= Tell El Kebir =

Place in Ismailia, Egypt

Tell El Kebir التل الكبير
- Location in Egypt
- Coordinates: 30°32′44″N 31°46′41″E
- Country: Egypt
- Governorate: Ismailia
- Time zone: UTC+2 (EET)
  - Summer (DST): UTC+3 (EEST)

Tell El Kebir (Arabic: التل الكبير lit."the great mound") is 110 km north-north-east of Cairo and 75 kilometres south of Port Said on the edge of the Egyptian desert at the altitude of 29 m. Administratively, it is a part of the Ismailia Governorate.

In the ancient times the city of On (modern Matariyah) mentioned in Genesis 41:45 was identified by some as located south-west of the mound, which according to the Egyptian legend was the first place where cotton was cultivated.

The location is famous for the Battle of Tell El Kebir which was fought in 1882 between the Egyptian army led by Ahmed 'Urabi and the British military. The ancient ruins of On were fortified into an entrenched camp by the Egyptian troops

== Relation with Abu Kabir in Palestine ==
The Egyptian troops of Ibrahim Pasha captured the city of Jaffa and its environs following a battle with the forces of the Ottoman Empire in 1832. Though Egyptian rule over this area continued only until 1840, Egyptian Muslims settled in and around Jaffa, founding among others the village of Abu Kabir. Many of the Egyptians who populated it came from Tell El Kebir and named it for their hometown.

== First World War ==
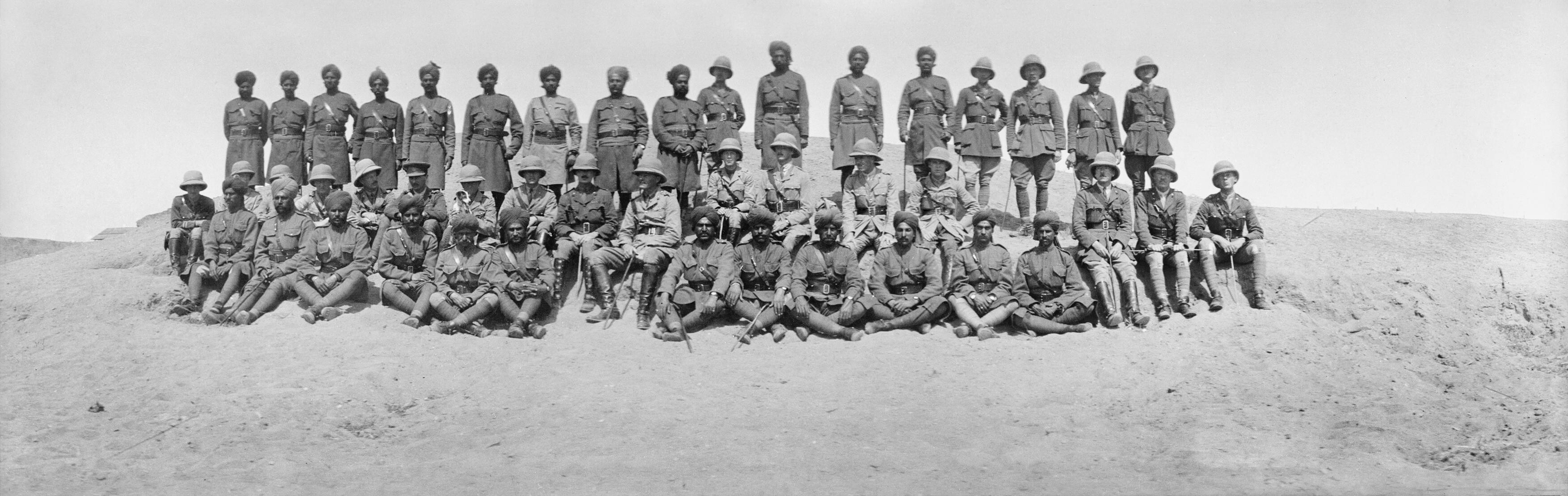
British and Indian officers of the 18th King George's Own Lancers at Tel el Kebir on arrival from France in April 1918.

During the Gallipoli landings and the Sinai and Palestine Campaign of the First World War, Tell El Kebir was a training centre for the First Australian Imperial Force reinforcements, No 2 Australian Stationary Hospital, and also a site of a large prisoner of war camp. Some 40,000 Australians camped in a small tent city at Tell El Kebir of six miles in length. A military railway was eventually constructed to take troops from the camp to their vessels in Alexandria and elsewhere for embarkation to Gallipoli landings.

The Tell El Kebir village was described by an Australian soldier in 1916 as

a very dirty little place with a few dirty shops in it

The Allied War Memorial Cemetery is situated about 175 metres east of the railway station and the Ismailia Canal. The War Memorial Cemetery was used from June 1915 to July 1920, and was enlarged after the Armistice many graves were transferred in from other temporary interment sites. The camp was converted for use as a holding camp for refugees fleeing the Russian Civil War from what used to be southern Russian Empire.

== Second World War ==
During the North African campaign of the Second World War, Tell El Kebir was a site for the Eighth Army vehicle park, a military hospital and a large ordnance depot, with many military mechanical and electrical repair workshops including the RAOC Base Vehicle Depot Tell El Kebir BVD(E) which remained for several years after the war as part of the Tell El Kebir Garrison which was surrounded by a perimeter wire and minefield, and heavily guarded due to the tense atmosphere in Egypt at the time, that supplied every type of vehicle used by the British Army in the Middle East Theatre until the Suez Emergency was declared, and fought in the Canal Zone.

The cemetery now contains 65 Commonwealth graves from the First World War and 526 from the Second World War. There are also 84 military graves of other nations in the cemetery. It is maintained by the Commonwealth War Graves Commission.

== See also ==
- List of cities and towns in Egypt
