= Allan David Stephen Barr =

Chartered Engineer

- Born: 11 September 1930; Glasgow, Scotland
- Died: 11 February 2018 (aged 87); Lincoln, England
- Education: The University of Edinburgh
- Known for: An academician in mechanical engineering

Allan David Stephen Barr (A. D. S. Barr) (11 September 1930 – 11 February 2018) was a British Chartered Engineer who was a professor at the University of Aberdeen.

Barr was selected as Fellow of the Royal Society of Edinburgh in 1983.

== Family ==
Allan David Stephen Barr was born on 11 September 1930, in Glasgow, Scotland, son of Allan and Agnes Barr. His father, Allan Barr, was a professor, a theologian and a moderator of the United Free Church of Scotland. (David, Barr, 2018) His grandfather, Rev James Barr, was elected as the first moderator of the United Free Church of Scotland in 1929.

== Education ==
Barr was educated at the University of Edinburgh, where he studied mechanical engineering in the early 1950s. In May 1956 he submitted his PhD thesis in the title “Approximate theories for the flexural vibration of uniform beams and their derivation from the general elastic equations”.

In this theis, Barr described experimental work on three deep rectangular sectioned beams against theories of flexural vibration. He first introduced how this experiment had been conducted,

“The approximate theories of flexural vibration dealt with in the thesis are those in which the problem is reduced to the solution of a differential equation with one dependent variable (the transverse displacement of the neutral line of the beam) by a process of making reasonable assumptions during the derivation of the equation, In order to facilitate comparisons of the effects of the various assumptions made in the different theories, the differential equations are derived from the general elastic equilibrium equations written in terms of the stress components.”

He went on,

“Particular attention is given to the equation which includes the effects of rotatory inertia and transverse shear (usually referred to as the Timoshenko equation) because of Its interesting prediction for a finite beam of the possible existence of more than one natural frequency with the same number of nodes (i.e, a second spectrum of frequencies).”

Barr then reported his research findings that “the predictions of the Timoshenko theory are closely followed, including the second spectrum frequencies. Third spectrum frequencies are detected very faintly for only one of the three beams, this is probably because lateral inertia is relatively unimportant for a cross-section of deep rectangular form”.

Barr's research was supervised by R. N. Arnold and J. D. Robson, and this was acknowledged in his thesis.

== Career ==
Barr worked as an academic and a researcher in mechanical engineering at different universities, for example, the University of Edinburgh, University of Dundee, as a lecturer, Reader, Head of the Department of Mechanical Engineering, Dean of the Faculty of Engineering and Applied Science. When he retired from the University of Aberdeen in 1996, he was emeritus Professor of Engineering.

As an academician, Barr successfully supervised research students. For example, Haxton acknowledged his gratitude to Barr in his PhD thesis submitted to the University of Edinburgh in 1971, noting that "The author wishes to gratefully acknowledge the valuable guidance given by his supervisor, Dr. A.D.S. Barr of the Department of Mechanical Engineering, and the Studentship support of the Science Research Council, London, during the period of this research."

== Life ==
Barr had a broad range of interests, including “flying as a member of the University Air Squadron, motorcycle racing, music, painting, fly fishing and nature conservation,”

Barr died from dementia in Lincoln on 11 February 2018.
