= Godfrey Lagden =

British colonial administrator

Sir Godfrey Lagden
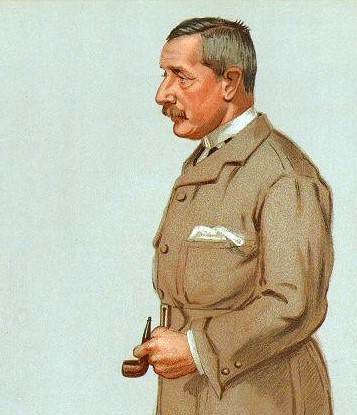

Personal details
- Born: 1 September 1851 Yetminster, Dorset, England
- Died: 26 June 1934 (aged 82) Weybridge, Surrey, England

Sir Godfrey Yeatman Lagden KCMG KBE (1 September 1851 – 26 June 1934) was a British colonial administrator in southern Africa. He served as Resident Commissioner of Basutoland (1893–1901) and, under Lord Milner, as Commissioner of Native Affairs for the Transvaal Colony from 1901. He is best known as chairman of the South Africa Native Affairs Commission (SANAC) of 1903–1905, whose report is widely regarded by historians as a foundational blueprint for the territorial racial segregation later entrenched in South Africa, and a precursor to the Natives' Land Act, 1913, the Natives (Urban Areas) Act, 1923 and, ultimately, the Group Areas Act of 1950.

== Early life ==
Lagden was born at Yetminster, Dorset, the son of Reverend Richard Dowse Lagden of Balsham House, Cambridgeshire and was educated at Sherborne School. He joined the British civil service as a clerk in the General Post Office where he worked from 1869 to 1877, when he decided to move to South Africa.

== Career in Africa ==
There he was introduced to the South African High Commissioner Sir Bartle Frere who sent him to the Transvaal Republic which had been newly annexed by Sir Theophilus Shepstone. There he would be initially appointed to its executive council.

He entered the colonial secretary's office in Pretoria and was private secretary to the new Administrator of the Transvaal, Sir Owen Lanyon, 1878–81. Lagden and Lanyon were in Pretoria when the town was besieged during the First Boer War. After the war, Lanyon was recalled to London, but Lagden remained and was briefly private secretary to Sir Evelyn Wood before returning to England in 1882. There he was engaged as war correspondent for the Daily Telegraph in Egypt, covering the British campaign against the ‘Urabi Revolt. He was one of a small party that entered Cairo ahead of the main force to demand its surrender. He took part in the charge at Kassassin and would deliver information essential to Sir Garnet Wolseley in his efforts to harass the army of Ahmed ʻUrabi and its eventual fall at the Battle of Tell El Kebir.

On his return in 1883, he was appointed Assistant Colonial Secretary in Sierra Leone but was sent to do some brief work in the Gold Coast. On the completion of the work there he was ordered to return to Sierra Leone by the Governor Sir Samuel Rowe. He decided to take leave instead and visited Kumasi, the first by a white man in twenty years, where he was captured and tried and he then escaped after being sentenced to die. After that, he fell out with the governor Rowe, and was sacked by the Colonial Office. However, a friend he had made in Pretoria, Marshal Clarke, had just been appointed resident commissioner in Basutoland in 1884 and insisted that Lagden be re-engaged to work for him as his secretary, which he did and eventually succeeded Clarke as resident commissioner 1893–1901. In Basutoland, he managed to control the infighting between tribes in the country and succeed in establishing hut taxes and their collection.

During the Second Boer War, which broke out in 1899, Lagden did all he could to keep Basutoland neutral ensuring the war did not draw in black soldiers. When he raised a force of 10,000 Basotho's and refused to use them to ensure the relief of Wepener other than to watch over the Cape Mounted Rifles, who were besieged by Boer forces until they were relieved by other British units. During the war, he raised and commanded the Transvaal Light Infantry.

In 1901 he was appointed commissioner of native affairs by Lord Milner in the Transvaal Colony, by then under British control and was also a member of its executive and legislative councils. During 1903 until 1905, he was chairman of the South African Native Affairs Commission and took evidence from all over South Africa and Rhodesia.

== South African Native Affairs Commission ==
In 1903 Lord Milner appointed Lagden to chair the South African Native Affairs Commission (SANAC), tasked with devising a uniform "native policy" for the four colonies that were to be united in the Union of South Africa. The commission took evidence from white officials and settlers, and from Africans, across the Cape, Natal, Transvaal and Orange River colonies, as well as in Rhodesia, Bechuanaland and Basutoland, between 1903 and 1905.

The report, published in 1905, recommended the permanent separation of black and white people in both landownership and politics. It proposed that land be demarcated into separate racial areas "with a view to finality"; that African political representation be confined to a separate voters' roll so that white voters could not be outnumbered; and that Africans in urban areas be restricted to segregated "locations". These recommendations established the framework for later segregationist legislation, including the Natives' Land Act of 1913, the Natives (Urban Areas) Act of 1923 and, ultimately, the Group Areas Act of 1950. The historian Martin Meredith has written that the commission's chief significance was that it transformed segregationist practices long common across southern Africa into an explicit political doctrine.

Lagden was dismissive of African political aspirations. Responding to a Transvaal petition signed by 46 chiefs and some 25,700 other Africans, he characterised it as having been "rapidly engineered by a few half-educated natives" connected with African newspapers, and said it could not be taken to represent Africans in general.

== Later life ==
He retired in 1907 after the Transvaal Colony gained self-rule and returned to Weybridge in England and served on various public bodies including the Royal Colonial Institute of which he was secretary and later vice-president, serving until 1923.

== Marriage ==
He married Frances Rebekah Bousfield in 1887, the daughter of the Bishop of Pretoria.

== Honours ==
Lagden was appointed a Companion of the Order of St Michael and St George (CMG) in the 1894 New Year Honours, promoted to Knight Commander of the Order (KCMG) in the 1897 Diamond Jubilee Honours for his work in Africa, and appointed a Knight Commander of the Order of the British Empire (KBE) in the 1927 Birthday Honours "in recognition of public services."

Lagden played cricket from time to time, including one first-class cricket match for the Marylebone Cricket Club (MCC) when a team visited South Africa in 1906.

== Works ==
- "The Native Question in South Africa" . The Empire and the century. London: John Murray. 1905. pp. 539–556.
