= Ismailia Governorate =

Governorate of Egypt

Coordinates: 30°36′N 32°17′E

- Governorate
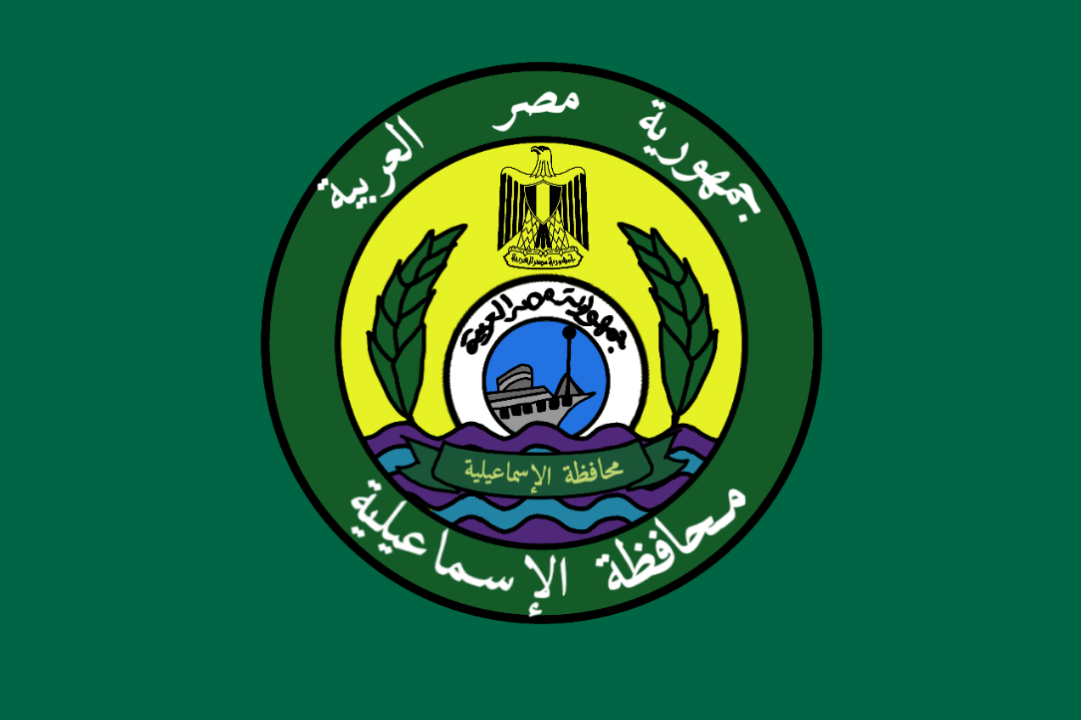
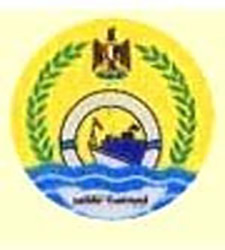
- Flag

- Ismailia Governorate on the map of Egypt
- Country: Egypt
- Seat: Ismailia (capital)

Government
  - Governor: Nabil El-Sayyed Mohamed Hasaballah

Area
  - Total: 5,066 km^{2} (1,956 sq mi)

Population (January 2023)
  - Total: 1,479,511
  - Density: 292.0/km^{2} (756.4/sq mi)

GDP
  - Total: EGP 91 billion (US$ 5.8 billion)
- Time zone: UTC+2 (EGY)
  - Summer (DST): UTC+3 (EEST)
- HDI (2021): 0.745 high · 8th
- Website: www.ismailia.gov.eg

Ismailia (Arabic: محافظة الإسماعيلية) is one of the Canal Zone governorates of Egypt. Located in the northeastern part of the country, its capital is the city of Ismailia. It was named after Ismail Pasha, who as Ottoman Viceroy of Egypt, oversaw the country during the building of the Suez Canal. It is located between the other two Canal governorates; Port Said Governorate, in the Northern part of Egypt and Suez Governorate.

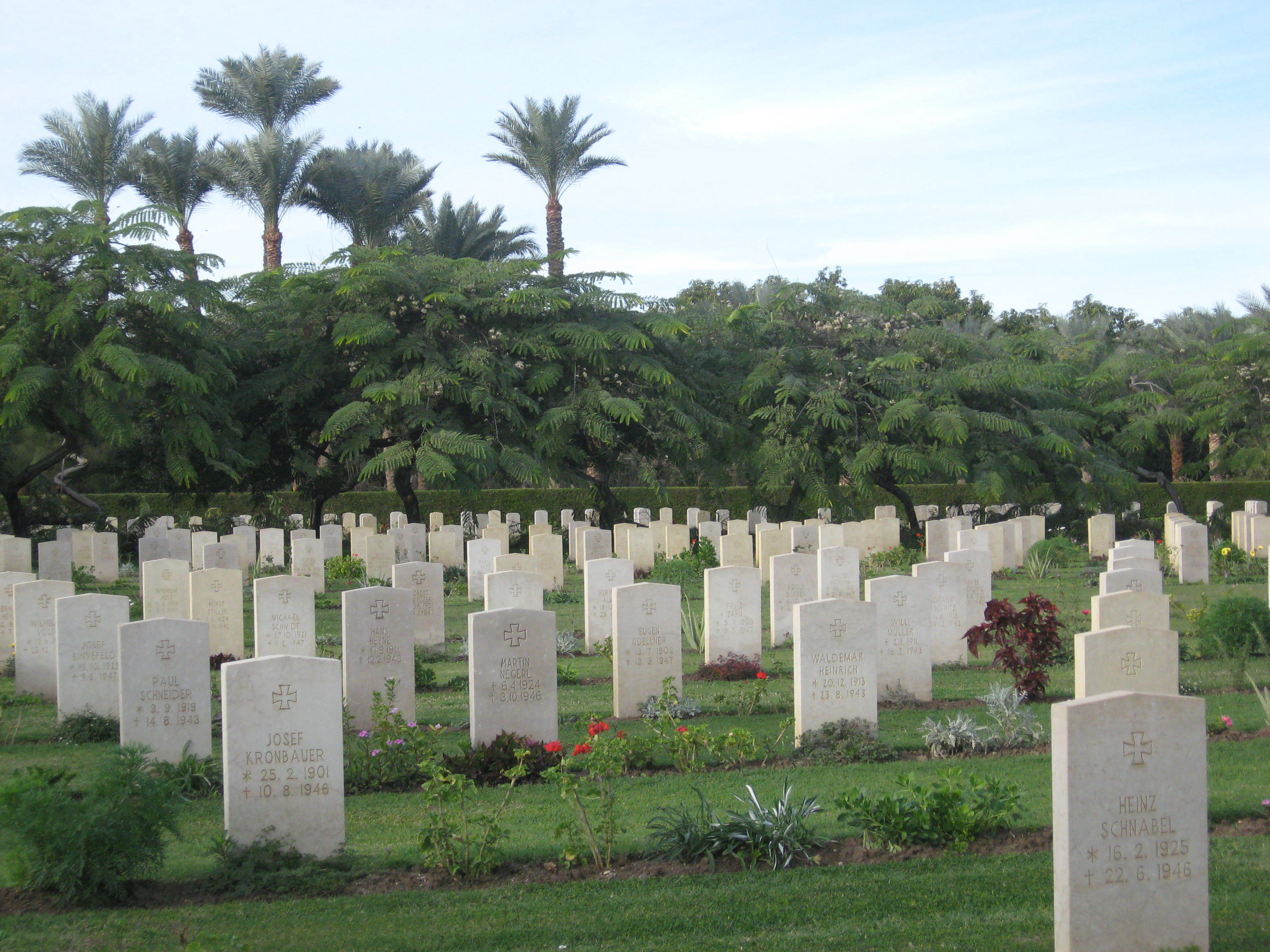
Fayed War Cemetery

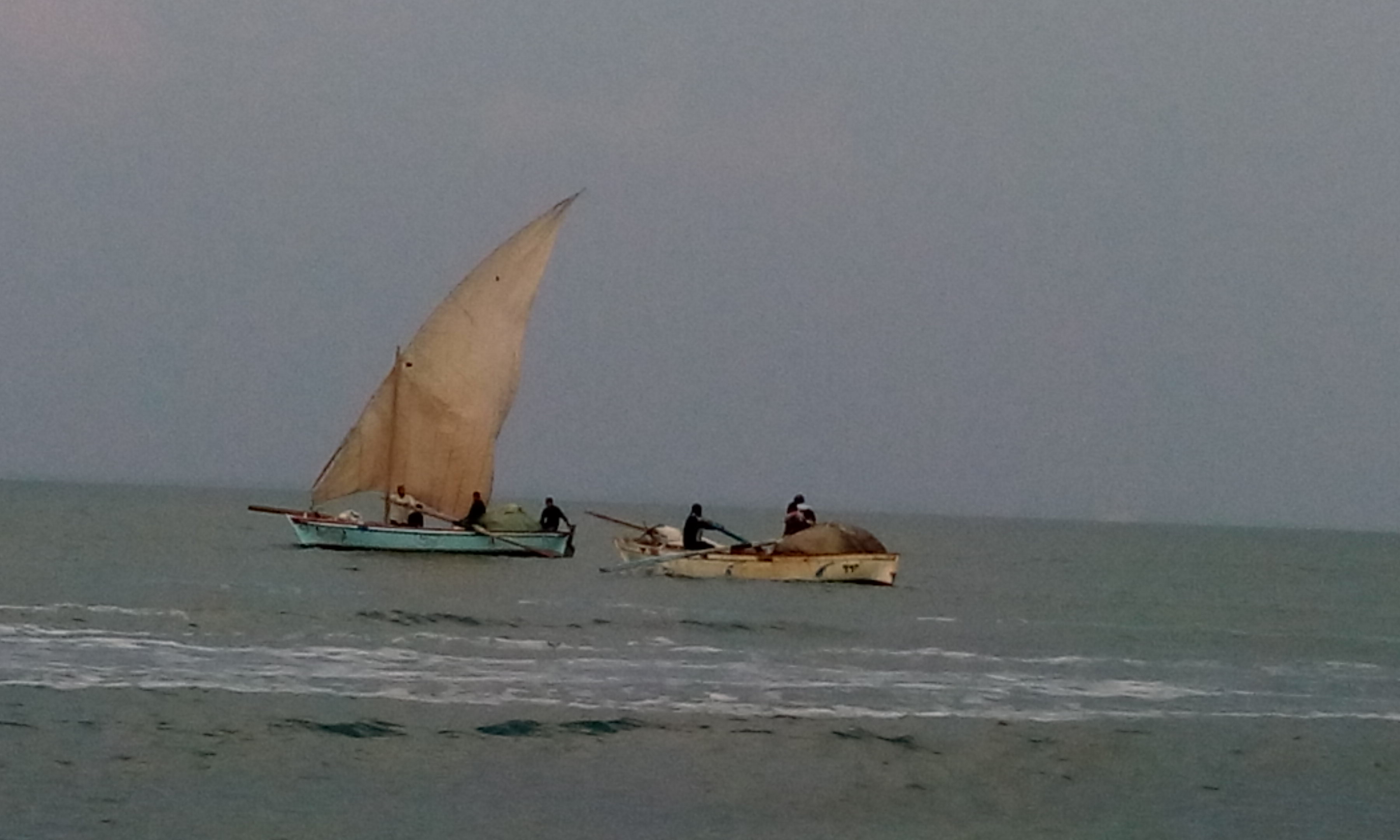
Boats in Great Bitter Lake (Fayed)

Historical population
Year	Pop.	±%
1966	345,000	—
1976	351,889	+2.0%
1986	544,427	+54.7%
1996	715,009	+31.3%
2006	942,832	+31.9%
2015	1,178,641	+25.0%
2023	1,442,402	+22.4%
1966–2006, 2015 is an estimate

== Municipal divisions ==
The governorate is divided into municipal divisions, with a total estimated population as of January 2023 of 1,479,511. In the case of Ismailia governorate, there are 4 kism, 5 markaz and 1 new city.

The divisions are generally seven: Ismailia which is the capital, Tell El Kebir, Abu Suwir, Qassasin, Fayid, Qantara West and Qantara East.

Municipal Divisions
Anglicized name	Native name	Arabic transliteration	Population (July 2017 Est.)	Type
Abu Suwir	مركز أبو صوير	Abū Ṣuwīr	221,994	Markaz
Ismailia	مركز الاسماعيلية	Al-Ismā'īliyah	170,065	Markaz
Ismailia 1	قسم أول الاسماعيلية	Al-Ismā'īliyah 1	49,859	Kism (fully urban)
Ismailia 2	قسم ثان الاسماعيلية	Al-Ismā'īliyah 2	264,376	Kism (fully urban)
Ismailia 3	قسم ثالث الاسماعيلية	Al-Ismā'īliyah 3	131,422	Kism (fully urban)
El Qantara West	مركز القنطرة غرب	Al-Qanṭarah Gharb	162,101	Markaz
El Qantara El Sharqiya	مركز القنطرة شرق	Al-Qanṭarah Sharq	62,600	Markaz
New Kasaseen	مركز القصاصين الجديده	Al-Qaṣāṣīn al-Jadīdah	120,788	New City
Tell El Kebir	مركز التل الكبير	At-Tall al-Kabīr	111,635	Markaz
Fayid	مركز فايد	Fa'id	147,562	Markaz

== Population ==
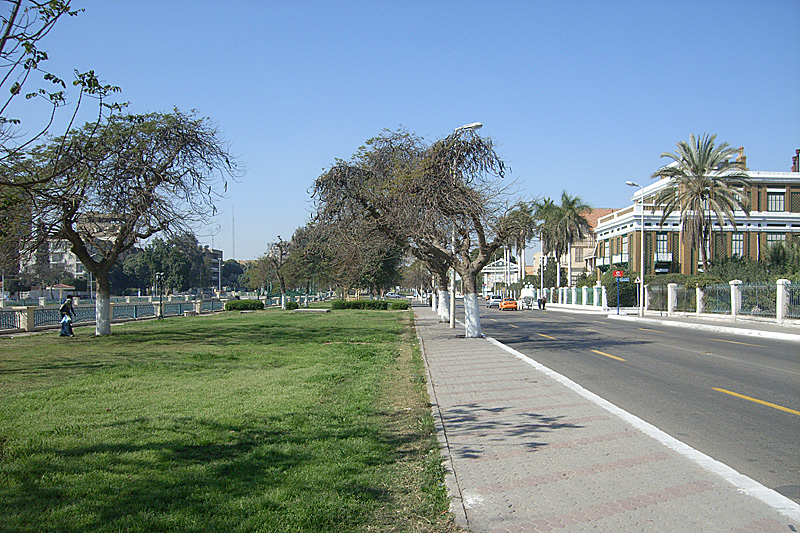
A street in the city

According to population estimates, in 2015 the majority of residents in the governorate lived in rural areas, with an urbanization rate of only 45.4%. Out of an estimated 1,479,511 people residing in the governorate, 807,813 people lived in rural areas as opposed to only 671,678 in urban areas.

== Cities and towns ==
As of 2017, seven cities (or towns) in Ismailia had a population of over 15,000 inhabitants.

Cities and towns with over 15,000 inhabitants
Anglicized name	Native name	Arabic transliteration	Nov. 1996 Census	Nov. 2006 Census	Population (July 2017 Est.)
Abu Suwir El Mahata	أبو صوير المحطة	Abū Ṣuwayr al-Maḥaṭṭah	18,331	24,265	29,476
Ismalia	الإسماعيلية	Al-Ismā'īliyah	255,134	293,184	386,372
New Kasaseen	القصاصين الجديدة	Al-Qaṣāṣīn al-Jadīdah	11,948	15,611	22,000
Tell El Kebir	التل الكبير	At-Tall al-Kabīr	31,410	26,891	37,000
Fayid	فايد	Fa'id	15,652	21,808	31,545

== Industrial zones ==
According to the Governing Authority for Investment and Free Zones (GAFI), the following industrial zones are located in Isamilia:

Zone name
Abo Khalifa Industrial Zone
East Qantra Industrial Zone
First and Second Industrial Zone
Technology Valley Industrial Zone

== Annual film festival ==
Hashim El Nahas founded the Ismailia International Film Festival for Documentaries and Shorts and originally considered establishing it in Luxor. Instead this festival has been celebrating its annual events in Ismailia Governorate. It is sponsored by the Ministry of Culture, Ismailia Governorate, The National Cinema Center and other sponsors.

== Ismailia Canal ==
The Ismailia Governorate is on the banks of the Suez Canal and its Ismailia Canal extends from the Nile River near Cairo to the Suez Canal at the city of Ismailia, on Lake Timsah. The Ismailia Canal was built to provide fresh water to workers during the building of the Suez Canal. The Suez Canal Authority headquarters is located in Ismailia.

== Conflicts and wars ==
From 1967 to 1970, Ismailia became a war zone and was damaged in the conflict with Israel. Many battles were fought, in and around Ismailia, including at the end of the conflict in the Battle of Ismailia and the area was able to begin rebuilding after a cease-fire was negotiated between Egypt and Israel in 1973.

== Fishing landing sites ==
There are several official fishing landing sites in Ismailia. One is at Lake Timsah and the other at Bitter Lake.

== UN sustainable programme ==
After a successful SIP (Sustainable Ismailia Programme) from 1992 to 1997, the United Nations expanded the project to include the entire Governorate of Ismailia calling it SGIP (Sustainable Ismailia Governorate Programme). Its goal is to work with local partners to improve the communities in Ismailia.
