= Lake Timsah =

Lake in Egypt

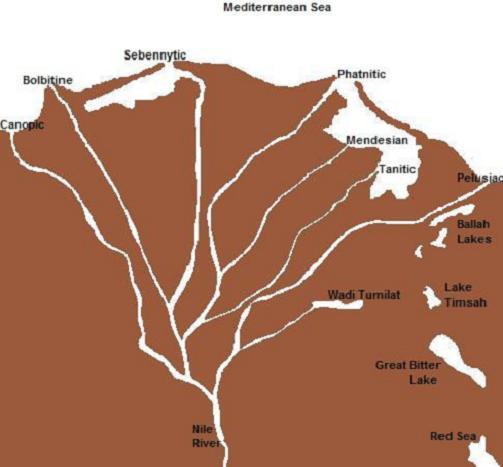
- Map of the Nile Delta showing Lake Timsah at center right.

- Location within Egypt
- Location: Al Isma'iliyah, Egypt
- Coordinates: 30.56667°N 32.28333°E
- Lake type: Hydrographic
- Surface area: 14 km^{2} (5.4 sq mi)
- Water volume: 80,000,000 m^{3} (2.8×10^{9} cu ft)

Lake Timsah, Arabic for Crocodile Lake (Arabic: بُحَيْرة التِّمْسَاح), is a lake in Egypt on the Nile Delta. It lies in a basin developed along a fault extending from the Mediterranean Sea to the Gulf of Suez through the Bitter Lakes region. In 1800, a flood filled the Wadi Tumilat, which caused Timsah's banks to overflow and moved water south into the Bitter Lakes about nine miles (14 km) away. In 1862, the lake was filled with waters from the Red Sea, and became part of the Suez Canal.

== Geography ==
Lake Timsah lies within a depression that spans the isthmus between the Red Sea and the Mediterranean Sea. The lowest points of the depression form shallow natural lakes, of which Timsah is one. The surface area of Lake Timsah covers 5.4 square miles. Most of the lake is marshy and depth rarely exceeds 3 feet (0.91 metres).

It has been asserted that, in ancient times, Lake Timsah was the northern terminus of the Red Sea.

On March 4, 1863, the city of Ismailia, named in honor of the viceroy Ismail Pasha, arose on Lake Timsah's northern bank. Several beaches overlook the lake, including the Moslem Youth, Fayrouz, Melaha, Bahary, Taawen, and a few Suez Canal Authority beaches.

== Canals ==
=== Canal of the Pharaohs ===
Approximate location of Canal of the Pharaohs

Lake Timsah possibly first became a juncture for canal construction approximately 4,000 years ago during the Middle Kingdom of Egypt, and was expanded by Darius I.

=== Suez Canal ===
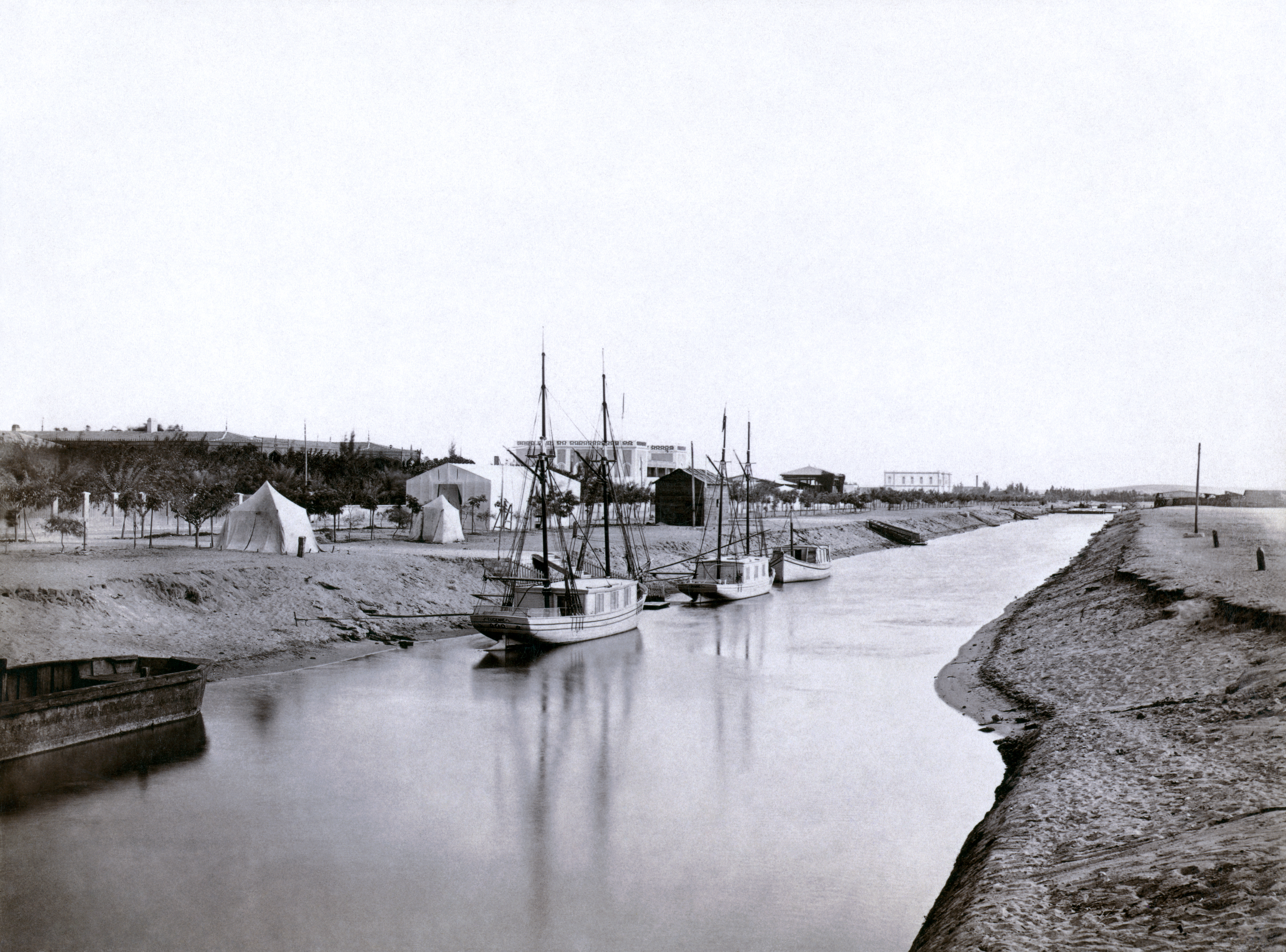
The Suez Canal at Ismailia by the northern bank of Lake Timsah, c. 1860. Completion of the segment brought waters from Lake Manzaleh to Lake Timsah.

Suez Canal construction in the vicinity of Lake Timsah began in 1861 on the segment north of the lake. Initial preparations included the construction of sheds to house 10,000 workers, steam sawmills, and importation of large quantities of wheelbarrows and wooden planks. 3,000 laborers dug a channel (Ismailia Canal) from the Nile to Lake Timsah in 1861 and 1862, which brought a fresh water supply to the area. It was also proposed to construct a halfway port at this point along the canal. The Ismailia section of the Suez Canal, which connected Lake Manzala to Lake Timsah, was completed in November 1862. Construction of the segment was completed with forced labor, which expanded the workforce to 18,000 men. The trench measured 50 feet (15 m) wide by four to six feet deep and connected Lake Timsah to the Mediterranean Sea. Work began south of Lake Timsah in 1862–1863 as expansion continued on the northern segment. Forced labor was used during canal construction from March 1862 until Ismail Pasha outlawed the practice in 1864. As a result of the canal, waters from Lake Manzaleh flowed into Lake Timsah. Expansion continued on the northern segment until 1867 and on the southern segment until 1876.

== Environment ==
=== Salinity ===
Lake Timsah is a brackish lake that experiences significant variations in salinity. Human engineering projects have impacted salinity, with resulting changes in the lake's biota. Decreases in salinity were noted as early as 1871 following Suez Canal construction, and subsequent enlargement of the channel from the Nile and other construction projects increased the inflow of fresh water to the lake. The El-Gamil outlet serves as Lake Timsah's principal source of salt water. Timsah's main source of fresh water was annual Nile flooding until the Aswan High Dam interrupted these flows in 1966, although groundwater also accounts for much of the lake's freshwater supply. Lake Timsah experiences both stratification variations in salinity and seasonal surface variations in salinity, and in recent decades freshwater taxa have been overtaking brackish taxa.

=== Pollution ===
In 2002, a study was conducted to check the concentrations of polycyclic aromatic hydrocarbons (PAHs) in fish and shellfish species that locals consume from the lake. Samples included tilapia, crabs, bivalves, clams and gastropods. The results showed that crabs contained "significantly higher concentrations of both total and carcinogenic PAHs than other species, while clams contained significantly lower levels of PAHs."

In 2003, a number of groups attempted to relieve the lake of pollution. It was a significant event for the local community, since the lake is of economic importance to the city and its fishermen.
