= Reginald Lagden =

English cricketer

Personal information
- Full name: Reginald Bousfield Lagden
- Born: 15 April 1893; Maseru, Basutoland
- Died: 20 October 1944 (aged 51); Karachi, British India
- Relatives: Ronald Lagden (brother)

Domestic team information
- Years: Team
- 1912–1914: Cambridge University
- 1912: Surrey
- 1926: Europeans

Career statistics
Competition	First-class
Matches	32
Runs scored	1,751
Batting average	31.83
100s/50s	6/6
Top score	153
Balls bowled	609
Wickets	11
Bowling average	31.18
5 wickets in innings	0
10 wickets in match	0
Best bowling	2/22
Catches/stumpings	18/–
- Source: CricketArchive, 10 September 2015

Reginald Bousfield Lagden OBE, MC (15 April 1893 – 20 October 1944) was a British businessman and sporting administrator in Calcutta. He was a double blue at the University of Cambridge, in cricket and field hockey, and went on to represent England in the latter sport, although his sporting career was interrupted by the First World War. After the war, Lagden settled in India, where he became prominent in Bengal business circles. He served as a president of the Calcutta Cricket and Football Club, and the Cricket Association of Bengal, but died in a plane crash in 1944, aged 51.

== Early life and sporting career ==
Lagden was born in Maseru, Basutoland (now Lesotho). His older brother, Ronald Owen Lagden, had also been born in Maseru, and was a first-class cricketer and England rugby union representative. Their father, Sir Godfrey Yeatman Lagden, was an Englishman who had been Resident Commissioner in Basutoland, while their mother was a South African, the daughter of Henry Bousfield, the first Bishop of Pretoria. The brothers were sent to school at Marlborough College, but then went their separate ways, with Ronald going on to Oriel College, Oxford, and Reginald going on to Pembroke College, Cambridge.

Making his first-class debut for the Cambridge University Cricket Club during the 1912 season, Lagden went on to score two centuries during the year – 101 against Yorkshire and 132 against Hampshire. In the 1912 University Match against Oxford, he played against his brother, who dismissed him for six runs in the second innings of what was to be his final first-class match. Towards the end of the season, in July, Lagden also played a single County Championship match for Surrey, appearing against Yorkshire at The Oval. Lagden added three more centuries in 1913 – 142 against Middlesex in the opening match of the season, a career-high 153 against Hampshire, and 125 against the MCC. Owing to this good form, he was selected in both of the Gentlemen v Players fixtures at the season's end, representing the Gentlemen (the amateur players). In Lagden's final year at Cambridge, he scored only a single century, an innings of 106 which once again came against Hampshire. In the same time, he was serving as captain of the Cambridge University Hockey Club. His hockey was played as a centre half-back, and he represented England in several internationals during both 1913 and 1914. He also captained the CC&FC in Calcutta, Bengal.

== Military service and later life ==
In the First World War, which saw his brother killed in action, Lagden served as an officer in the Rifle Brigade (Prince Consort's Own). He reached the substantive rank of Captain and the temporary rank of Major by the war's end, and was also awarded the Military Cross. After the war, Lagden moved to Bengal, India, setting himself up as a businessman in Calcutta. He remained involved in cricket, and in December 1926 played one final first-class match, captaining the "Europeans of the East" against a touring English team. Over twelve years had passed since his previous match at that level. In 1928, he and Alexander Hosie, a former Hampshire player, were "the moving force behind the formation" of the Cricket Association of Bengal (CAB). Lagden served as one of the first presidents of the association, and was also president of the Calcutta Cricket and Football Club (CC&FC), first elected in 1933. In 1926, Lagden sent an invitation to Lord Harris for M.C.C. to send a cricket team to India. This played a part in the first tour of India by the M.C.C. that winter.

In May 1937, Lagden was made an Officer of the Order of the British Empire (OBE), at which time he was a partner at McLeod & Co., a Calcutta tea firm. He had also served as chairman of the Indian Tea Association. In October 1944, while returning to Calcutta from England, the RAF plane in which Lagden was travelling overshot the runway at Karachi Airport, killing several of those on board in the subsequent explosion. He was survived by a widow and six children, who were awarded £17,300 in compensation after a six-year legal battle. After his death, the CC&FC erected a stone archway in his memory, which is known as the Lagden Gate.
