= List of museums in Egypt =

Egypt has one of the oldest civilizations in the world. Thus, it has been in contact with many other civilizations and nations and also has been through so many eras, starting from pre-historic age to the modern age, passing through so many ages such as; Pharonic, Roman, Greek, Islamic and many other ages. Because of this wide variation of ages and the continuous contact with other nations, many museums may be found in Egypt, covering a wide area of these ages.

Following is a sortable list of museums in Egypt.

Name	Arabic-language native name	City	Type	Year established	Official website	Coordinates
Abdeen Palace Museum	قصر عابدين	Cairo		1863		30°02′30″N 31°14′54″E
Agricultural Museum		Cairo	agriculture	1930		
Ahmed Shawki Museum		Cairo				
Alexandria National Museum		Alexandria				
Al Minya Museum						
Al-Alemein War Museum						
Aswan Museum		Elephantine		1912		24°05′5″N 32°53′12″E
Bayt Al-Suhaymi		Cairo				
Beit El-Umma (House of the People)		Cairo				
Beshtak Palace		Cairo				
Carriage Museum		Cairo				
Child Museum		Cairo	children's	1985		
Coptic Museum		Cairo				
Denshway Museum		al-Minufiyah				
Egyptian Geological Museum		Cairo				
Egyptian Military museum		Cairo	Citadel	1938		
Egyptian Museum		Cairo	Ancient Egypt Antiquities			
Gamal Abdel Nasser Museum		Cairo				
Gayer-Anderson Museum		Cairo				
Gezira Center for Modern Art (also known as the Egyptian Modern Art Museum)		Cairo	contemporary and modern art			
Graeco-Roman Museum		Alexandria		1892	grm.gov.eg	
Hurghada Museum		Hurghada		2020	https://hurghadamuseum.com/	
Imhotep Museum		Saqqara		2006		
Ismaïlia Museum		Ismaïlia	archaeology	1932		
Karanis Site Museum		Faiyum	archaeology			
Kasr (Qasr) El-Gawhara (Jewel Palace)		Cairo				
Kharga Museum		El Kharga				
Library of Alexandria Museum		Alexandria				
Luxor Museum		Luxor				
Manyal Palace		Cairo				
Marine Museum		Hurghada				
Mellaoui Museum						
Military Museum		Port Said				
Mohamed Mahmoud Khalil Museum		Giza		1962		
Mohamed Nagy Museum		Cairo				
Mukhtar Museum		Cairo				
Mummification Museum		Luxor		1997		
Museum of Egyptian Railways		Cairo				
Museum of Islamic Art, Cairo		Cairo				
Museum of Islamic Ceramics		Cairo				
National Museum of Egyptian Civilization		Cairo		2017		
Museum of Modern Art in Egypt		Port Said	contemporary and modern art	1995		
Museum of Tal Basta Antiquities		Zagazig	archaeology	2006		
Nubian Museum		Aswan		1997		41°23′37″N 2°09′53″E
Om Kalthoum Museum		Cairo				
Grand Egyptian Museum		Giza				
Postal Museum		Cairo				
Qasr Al-Eini Museum		Cairo	medical	1998		
Ramses Wessa Wassef Art Center						
Royal Jewelry Museum		Alexandria	art and history	1986		
Taha Hussein Museum		Cairo	historic house			
Museum in the University of Al-Zagazig		Zagazig	archaeology	1981		

== See also ==
- Culture of Egypt
- List of museums
