= Mausoleum of Saad Zaghloul =

Mausoleum in Cairo, Egypt

Coordinates: 30.037583°N 31.237894°E

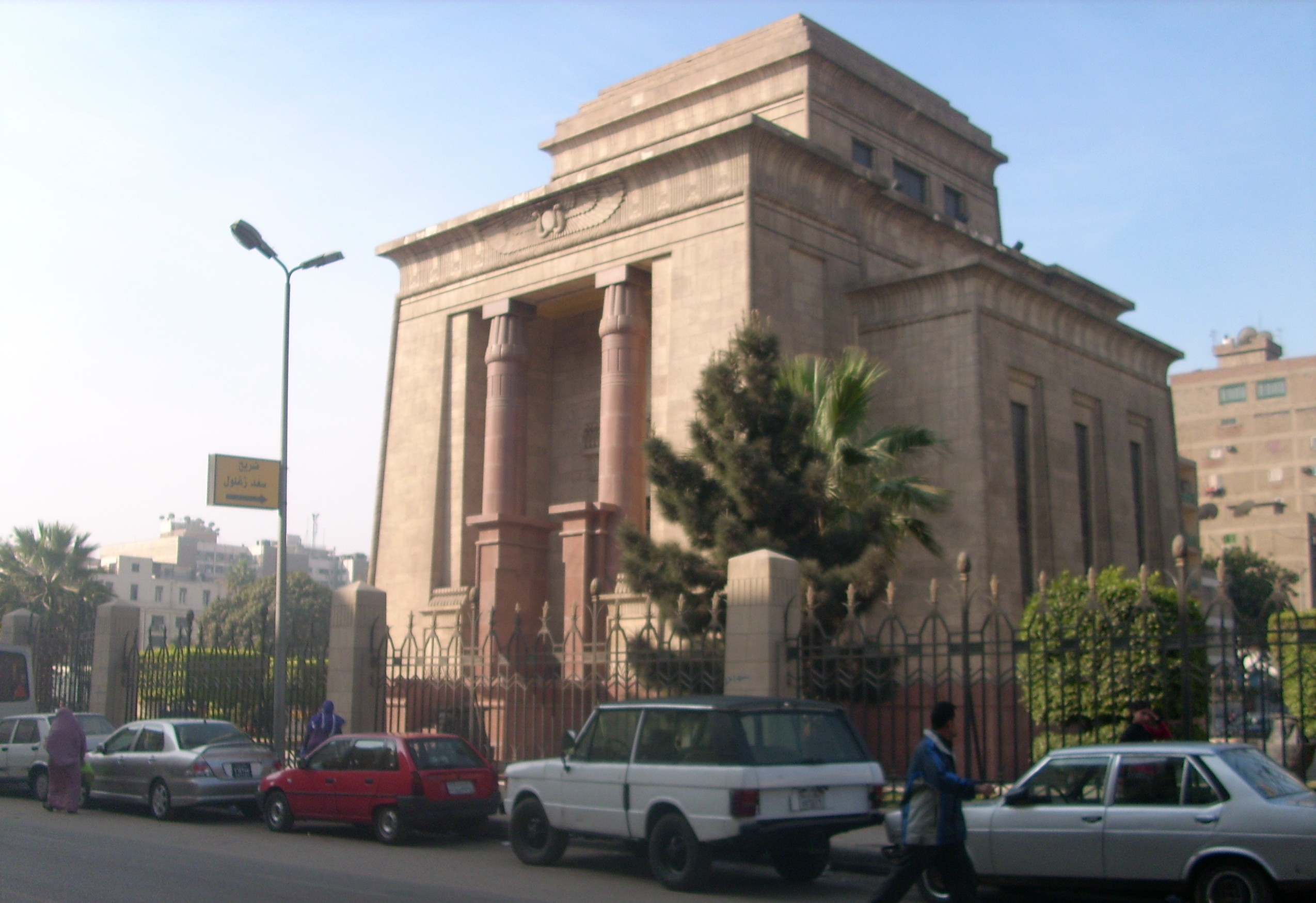
Mausoleum of Saad Zaghloul

The Saad Zaghloul Mausoleum (Arabic: ضريح سَعد زَغلول) was built following the death of Egyptian prime minister Saad Zaghloul, and was completed by architect Mustafa Fahmy in 1936. It is located in Downtown Cairo, Egypt near Zaghloul's old house, which is known as Beit El-Umma or the "House of the Nation".

== Overview ==
While Zaghloul died in 1927, his interment did not occur until June 1936 due to disagreements over the mausoleum's design. The Egyptian coalition government favored an Arabo-Islamic style, and the construction of a mosque was also considered, although this idea was rejected with the rationale that Zaghloul was a national leader rather than a religious figure. Fahmy ultimately constructed a mausoleum that adhered to a neo-Pharaonic motif, a decision that opponents of the project attributed to Makram Ebeid and other Copts. However, in his academic article, The Politics of the Funereal: The Tomb of Saad Zaghloul, Ralph M. Coury posited that the design was instead finalized by the Department of Works.

Budgetary concerns related to the project also plagued the project, with Mohamed Mahmoud Pasha and his ministry successfully stalled the project during his tenure. Once the Wafd Party returned to power in 1930, the restrictions on construction were lifted, although the Liberal Constitution Party soon returned back to power later that year. The mausoleum itself was completed by 1931, although Ismail Sidky delayed the transfer of Zaghloul's body for the remainder of his tenure. Safiya Zaghloul, the widow of the Saad, rejected Sidky's suggestion of burying Zaghloul with other notable figures, so Sidsky instead transferred mummies from an Egyptian museum to Zaghloul's mausoleum, where they remained for several years. Upon the Wafd's return to power in 1936, the mummies were removed and replaced with Zaghloul's body.

Built partly of granite, the mausoleum's design features an outward-curving cornice and entrance flanked by two great lotus pillars with a pylon gate leading to the interior space, which also houses an unmarked sarcophagus.

== See also ==
- Emir Qurqumas Complex
