= Saad Zaghloul =

Prime Minister of Egypt (1924)

The Honourable Saad Zaghloul Pasha
- سعد زغلول
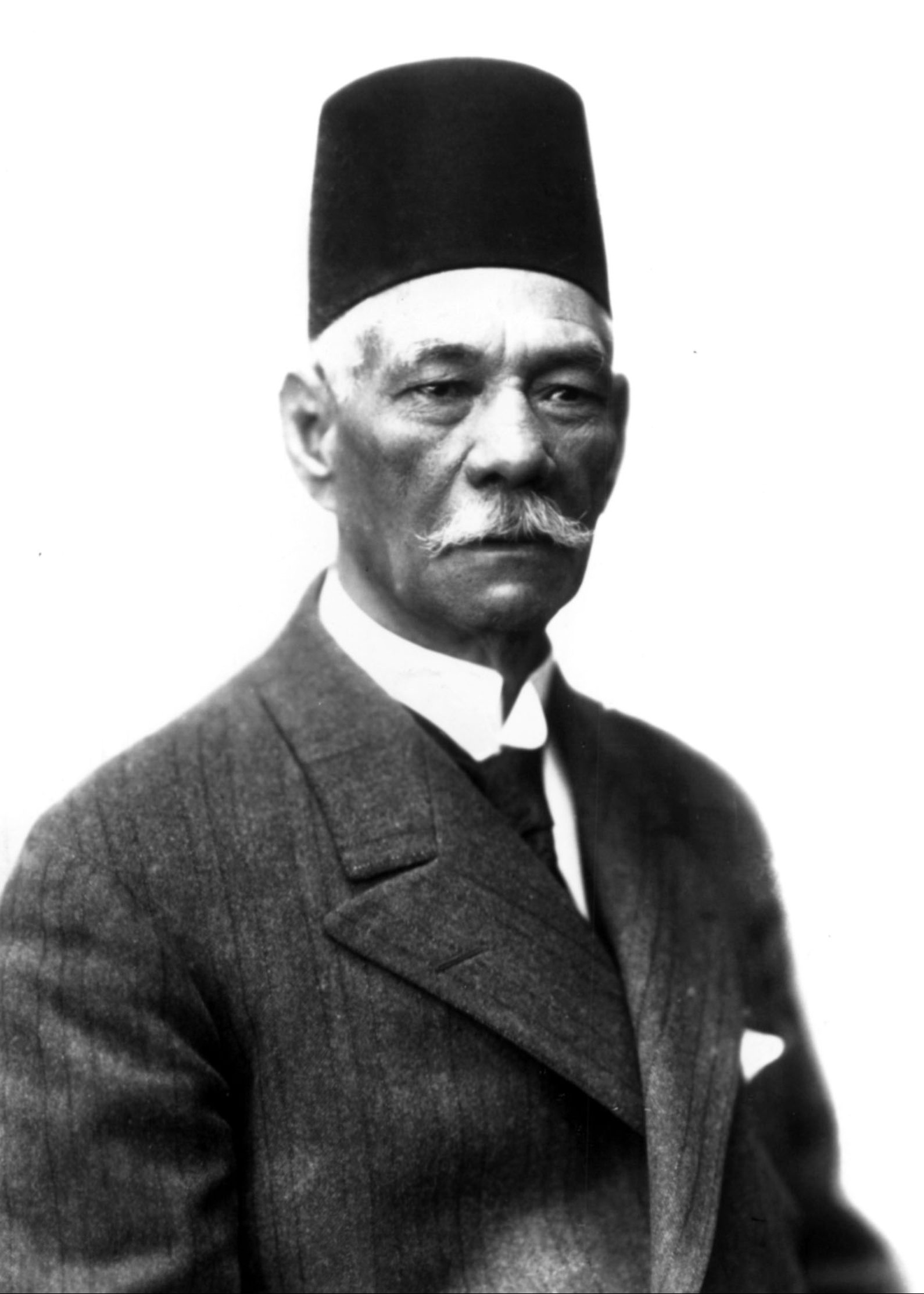
- Zaghloul in 1925

17th Prime Minister of Egypt
- In office 26 January 1924 – 24 November 1924
- Monarch: Fuad I
- Preceded by: Yahya Ibrahim Pasha
- Succeeded by: Ahmad Ziwar Pasha

Minister of Justice
- In office 1910–1912
- Monarch: Abbas II

Minister of Education
- In office 28 October 1906 – 23 February 1910
- Monarch: Abbas II

Personal details
- Born: 1 July 1859 Ibyana, Kafr el-Sheikh Governorate, Khedivate of Egypt
- Died: 23 August 1927 (aged 68) Cairo, Kingdom of Egypt
- Resting place: Mausoleum of Saad Zaghloul , Cairo
- Party: Wafd Party
- Spouse: Safiya Zaghloul

Saad Zaghloul Pasha (Arabic: سعد زغلول / ALA-LC: Saʻd Zaghlūl; also Sa'd Zaghloul Pasha ibn Ibrahim) (July 1857 – 23 August 1927) was an Egyptian revolutionary and statesman. He was the leader of Egypt's nationalist Wafd Party.

He led a civil disobedience campaign with the goal of achieving independence for Egypt (and Sudan) from British rule. He played a key role in the Egyptian Revolution of 1919, as well as played a role in prompting the British Unilateral Declaration of Egyptian Independence in 1922. He served as Prime Minister of Egypt from 26 January 1924 to 24 November 1924.

== Education, activism and exile ==
Zaghloul was born in Ibyanah village in the Kafr el-Sheikh Governorate of Egypt's Nile Delta. For his post-secondary education, he attended Al-Azhar University and a French law school in Cairo. By working as a Europeanized lawyer, Zaghloul gained both wealth and status in a traditional framework of upward mobility. Despite this, Zaghloul's success can equally be attributed to his familiarity with the Egyptian countryside and its many idioms. He was part of the Egyptian freemason lodge. In 1918, he became politically active, as the founding leader of the Wafd Party, for which he was later arrested.

== Rise in the bureaucracy ==
Upon his release from prison, he practiced law and distinguished himself; amassed some independent means, which enabled him to participate in Egyptian politics, then dominated by the struggle of moderate and extremist against British occupation; and effected useful, permanent links with different factions of Egyptian nationalists. He became close to Princess Nazli Fazl, and his contacts with the Egyptian upper class led to his marriage to the daughter of the Egyptian prime minister Mustafa Fahmi Pasha, whose friendship with Evelyn Baring, 1st Earl of Cromer, then the effective British ruler of Egypt, accounts in part for the eventual acceptability of Zaghloul to the British occupation. In succession, Zaghloul was appointed judge, minister of education (1906–1908), minister of justice (1910–1912); and in 1913 he became vice-president of the Legislative Assembly.

In all his ministerial positions, Zaghloul undertook certain measures of reform that were acceptable to both Egyptian nationalists and the British occupation. Throughout this period, he kept himself outside extreme Egyptian nationalist factions, and although acceptable to the British occupation, he was not thereby compromised in the eyes of his Egyptian compatriots. The relationship between Britain and Egypt continued to deteriorate during and after the Great War.

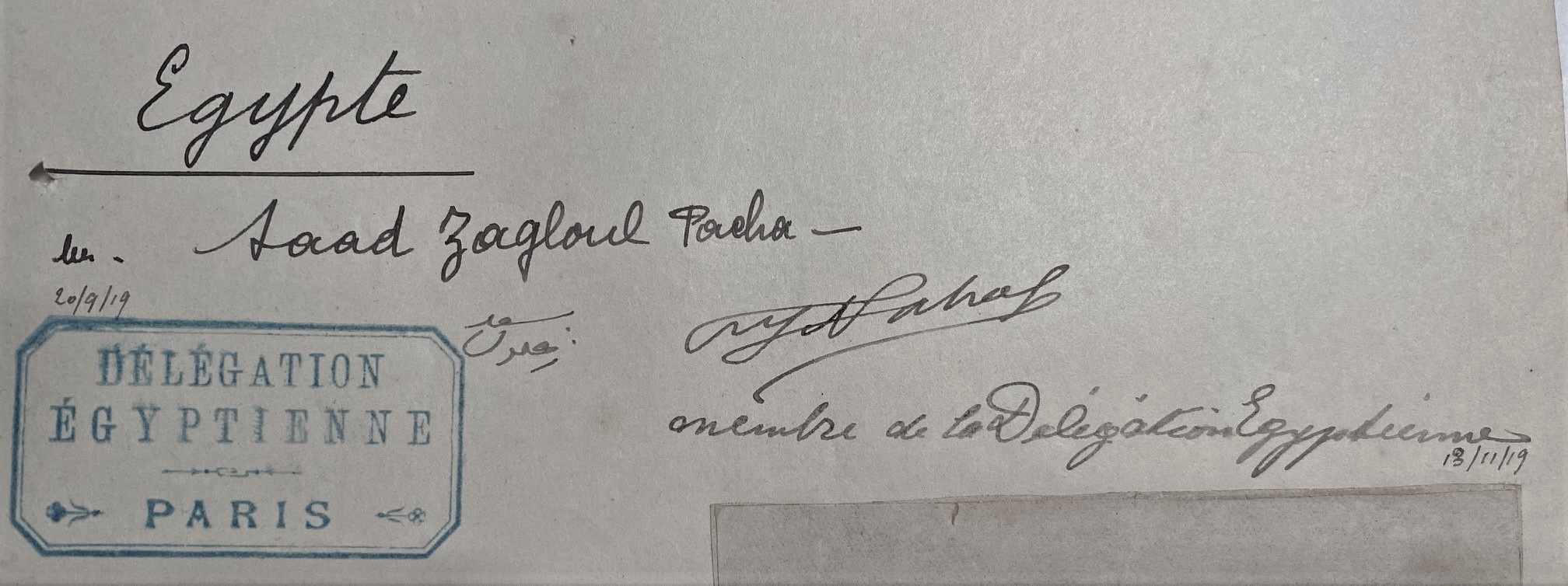
Signature of Saad Zaghloul as Head of the Egyptian Delegation to the Paris Peace Conference, Versailles 1919.

== Exile ==
Zaghloul became increasingly active in nationalist movements, and in 1919 he led an official Egyptian delegation (or wafd, the name of the political party he would later form) to the Paris Peace Conference demanding that the United Kingdom formally recognize the independence and unity of Egypt and Sudan (which had been united as one country under Muhammad Ali Pasha). Other members of the delegation were Hamad Mahmoud El Bassel Pasha and Abdel Latif Mikabbaty. Britain had occupied the country in 1882, and declared it a protectorate at the outbreak of the First World War. Though Egypt and Sudan had its own Sultan, parliament and armed forces, it had effectively been under British rule for the duration of the occupation.

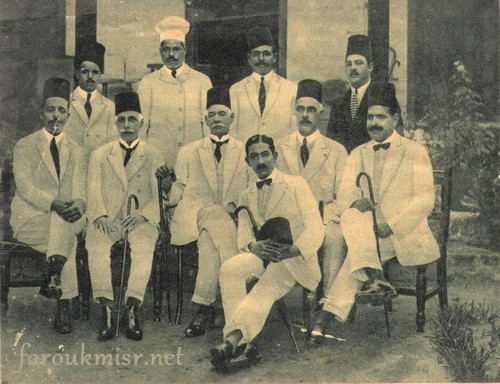
Saad Zaghloul before exile

The British in turn demanded that Zaghloul end his political agitation. When he refused, they exiled him to Malta, and later to the Seychelles. In 1922, he was moved from the Seychelles and was taken to Gibraltar due to ill health arriving there on board HMS Curlew and he was released in 1923. They had employed a similar tactic against Egyptian nationalist leader Ahmed Orabi in 1882, whom they exiled to Ceylon. At the time of Zaghloul's arrival in the Seychelles, a number of other prominent anti-imperialist leaders were also exiled there, including Mohamoud Ali Shire, the 26th Sultan of the Warsangali, with whom Zaghloul would soon develop a rapport. In order to avoid engendering anti-colonial sentiments, the colonial government imposed edicts which censored letters that exiled individuals sent to their family and compatriots back home. Zaghloul regularly found a way around these controls. He and other prominent exiles employed letter-writing as major non-violent political tools of communication, through which they were able to describe their time in exile beyond the Seychelles.

== Political history ==
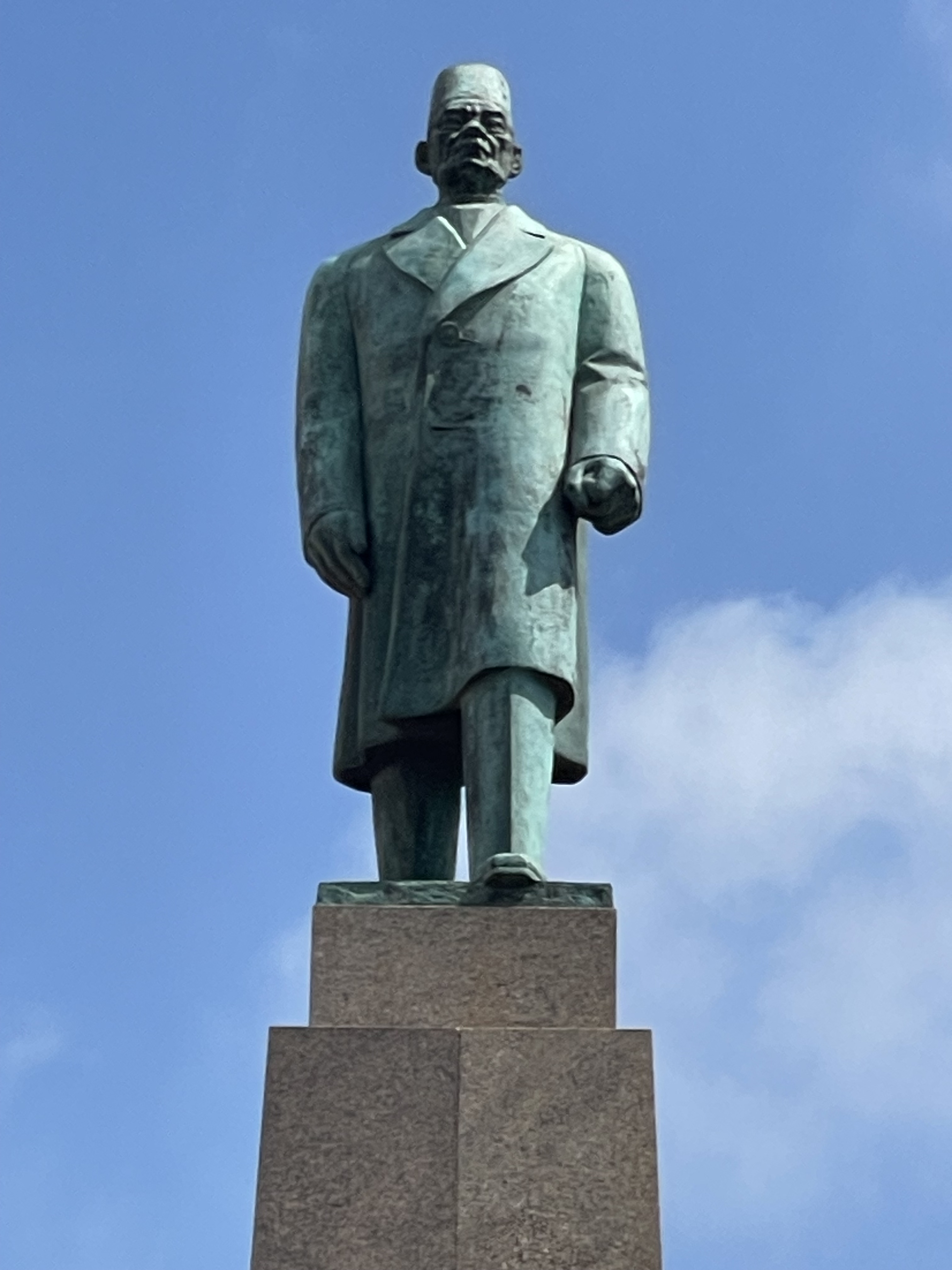
The Saad Zaghloul Pasha statue in Alexandria.

Zaghloul's absence caused disturbances in Egypt, ultimately leading to the Egyptian Revolution of 1919.

Upon his return from exile, Zaghloul led the Egyptian nationalist forces. He began to formulate a strong base amid his return which led to the elections of 12 January 1924 giving the Wafd Party an overwhelming majority, and two weeks later, led to Zaghloul forming the first Wafdist government. As P. J. Vatikiotis writes in The History of Modern Egypt (4th ed., pp. 279 ff.):

The masses considered Zaghloul their national leader, the za'im al-umma, the uncompromising national hero. His opponents were equally discredited as compromisers in the eyes of the masses. Yet he also had finally come to power partly because he had compromised with the palace group and implicitly accepted the conditions governing the safeguarding of British interests in Egypt.

Following the assassination on 19 November 1924 of Sir Lee Stack, the Sirdar and Governor-General of the Sudan, and subsequent British demands which Zaghloul felt to be unacceptable, Zaghloul resigned. Yet he returned to active politics two years later and, though he never again held the Prime Ministership, he remained an extremely influential figure until his death in 1927.

== Family ==
Zaghloul's wife, Safiya Khānūm, was the daughter of Mustafa Fahmi Pasha, the Egyptian cabinet minister and two-time prime minister of Egypt. A feminist and revolutionary, she was also active in politics.

Zaghloul's brother, Ahmad Fathy Zaghlul was a lawyer and politician. He had several administrative and government posts, and at one point was Deputy Minister of Justice. In 1906 he was amongst the Egyptian judges at the summary trial for the Denshawai Incident.

He is buried with his wife in their mausoleum Beit El-Umma in Cairo.

== Timeline ==
- 1857 July: Born into a middle-class peasant family in Ibaynah in the Nile delta.

Education: Attended the Al-Azhar in Cairo, as well as at the Egyptian School of Law.

- 1892: Appointed judge at the Court of Appeal
- 1895: Marries the daughter of the Prime minister of Egypt, Mustafa Pasha Fahmi
- 1906: Becomes head of the Ministry of Education.

— Partakes in the establishment of Hizbu l-Ummah, which was a moderate group in a time when more and more Egyptians claimed to revive their independence from the British.

- 1910: Zaghloul appointed Minister of justice.
- 1912: Resigns from the post as Minister of justice after a disagreement with Khedive Abbas Hilmi II.
- 1912: Is elected to the Legislative Assembly.
- 1913: Is appointed vice-president of the Legislative Assembly, a position he uses to criticise the government.
- 1914–18: During World War I, Zaghloul and many members from the old Legislative Assembly form activist groups all over Egypt. The World War I leads to much hardship on the Egyptian population, because of the many British restrictions.
- 1918 November 13: With the end of World War I, Zaghloul and two other former members from the Legislative Assembly call upon the British high commissioner, asking for the abolition of the protectorate. They also ask to be representatives of Egypt in the peace negotiations after the war. These demands are refused, and Zaghloul's supporters, a group now known as Wafd, instigated disorder all over the country.
- 1919 March: Zaghloul and three other members of Wafd are deported to Malta. Zaghloul is soon released after that General Edmund Allenby takes over as high commissioner of Egypt. He travels to Paris, France in an attempt to present his version of Egypt's case to representatives of the Allied countries, but without much success.
- 1920: Zaghloul has several meetings with the British colonial secretary, Lord Milner. They reach an understanding, but Zaghloul is uncertain of how the Egyptians will see him if he forges an agreement with the British, so he withdraws.

— Zaghloul returns to Egypt, and is welcomed as a national hero.

- 1921: Zaghloul uses his supporters to hinder the establishment of a British-friendly government. Allenby responds by deporting Zaghloul to the Seychelles in the Indian Ocean.
- 1922 February: Egypt receives limited independence, according to Lord Milner's recommendations, as these were designed through the talks with Zaghloul.
- 1923: Zaghloul is allowed to return to Egypt.
- 1924 February: Zaghloul becomes Prime minister after that Wafd wins 90% of the parliament seats in elections.

— Zaghloul experiences that not even he is able to stop demonstrations and riots among Egyptians. — November: After that the British commander in chief over the Egyptian army is killed, Zaghloul is forced to leave office.

- 1926: Zaghloul becomes president of the parliament, and from this position he is able to control the actions of extreme nationalists.
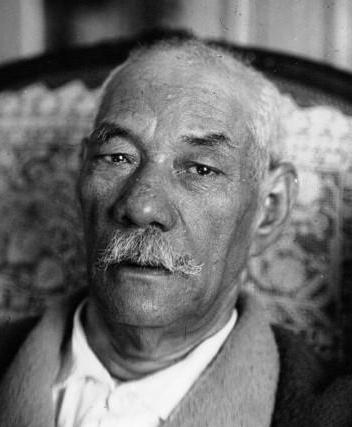
- Saad Zaghloul in 1924
  1927 August 23: Zaghloul dies in Cairo.

== Death ==
Saad Zaghloul died in Cairo on 23 August 1927, and was buried in the tombs of Imam Al-Shafi'i. His remains were later transferred to a mausoleum built for him at 1936, nine years after his death.

== Gallery ==
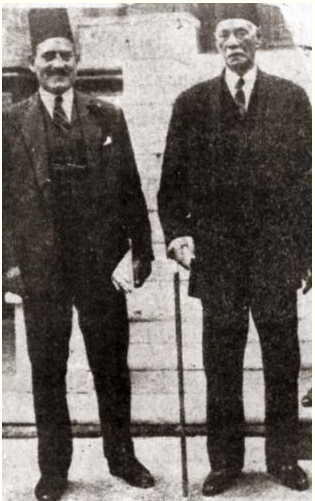
Mustafa el-Nahhas with Saad Zaghlul

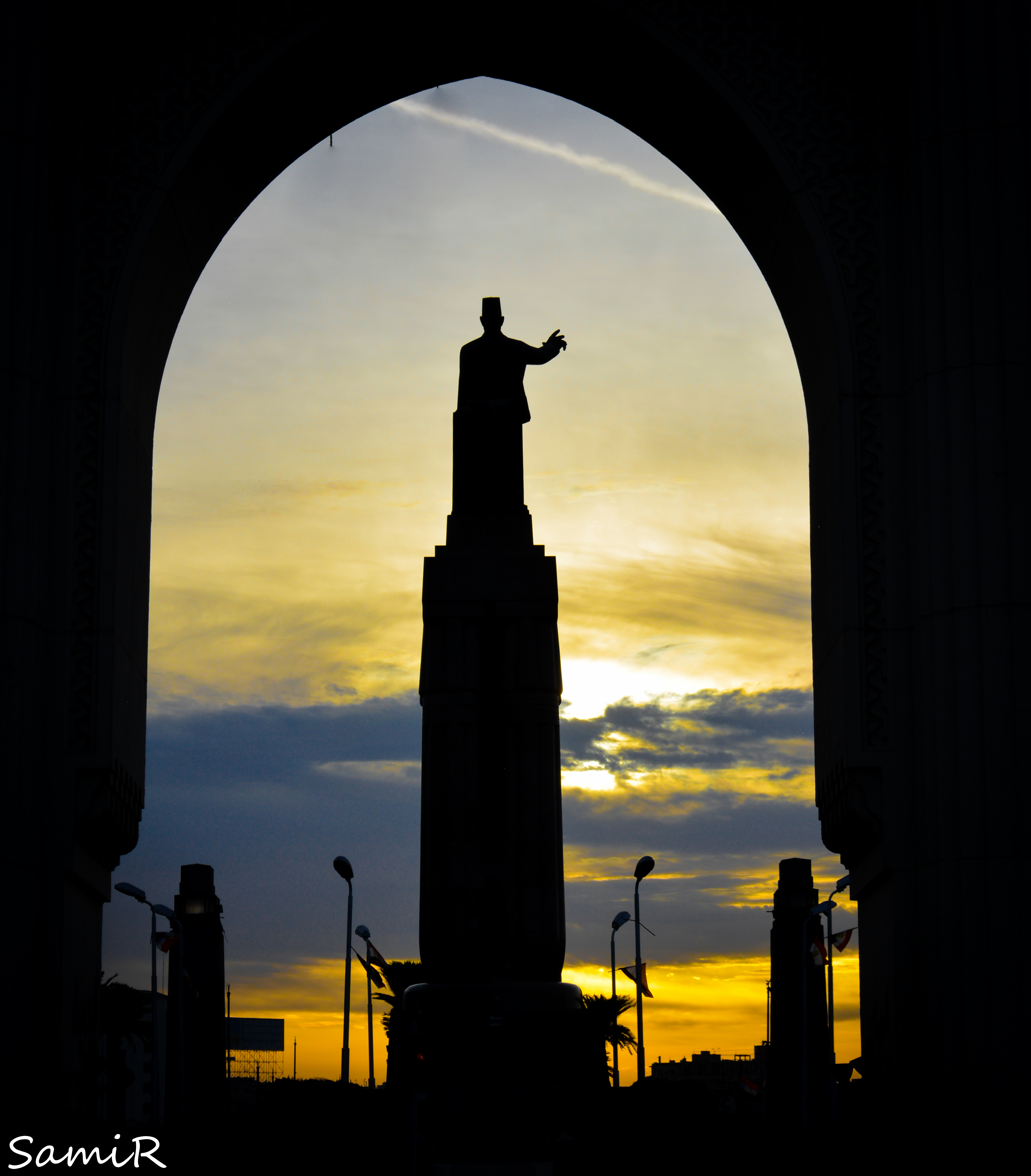
Saad Zaghloul Square

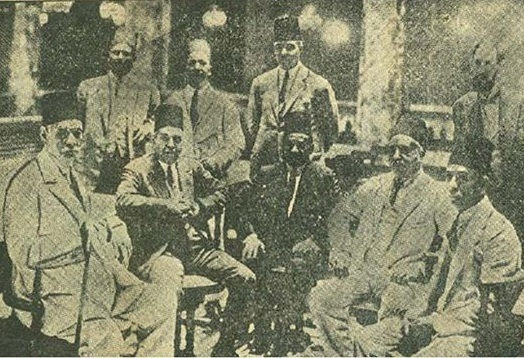
Saad Zaghlol with Talaat Harb

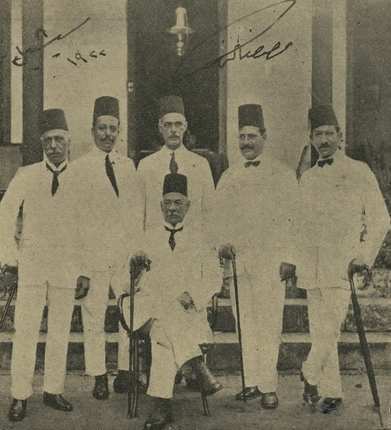
The Egyptian Wafd Members in the Seychelles, 1922

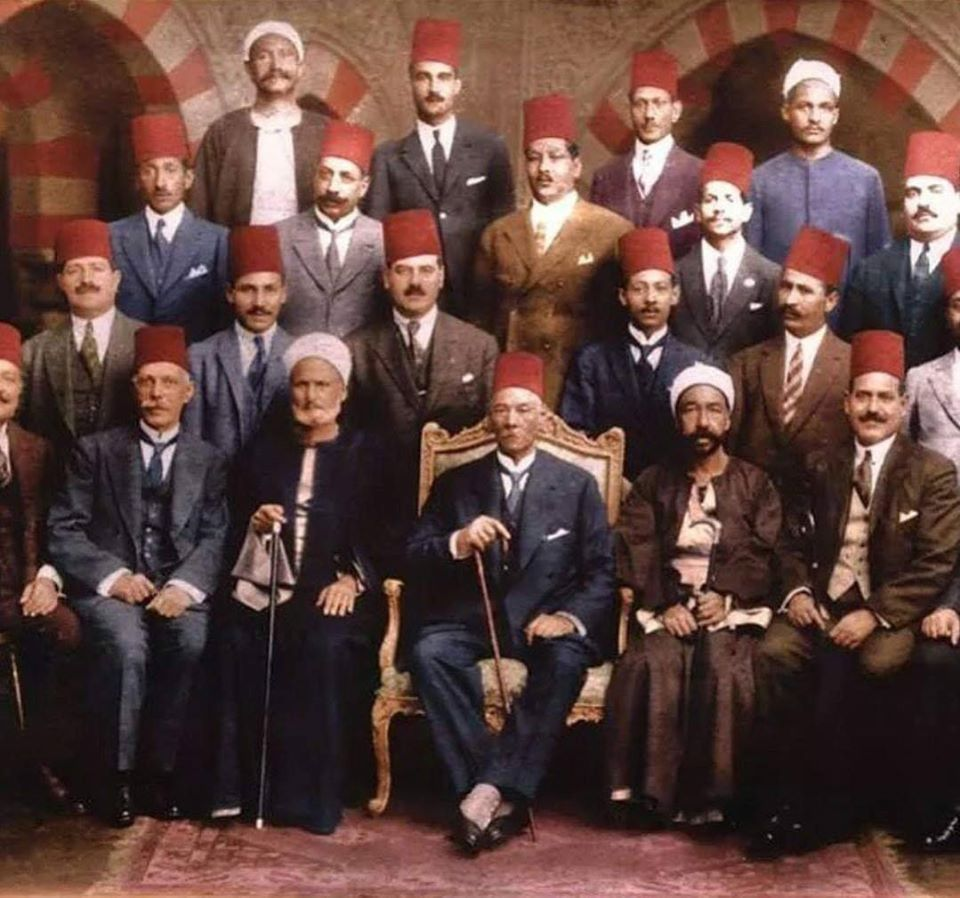
Saad Zaghloul with some members of the delegation

== See also ==
- Mausoleum of Saad Zaghloul
- Safiya Zaghloul

Political offices
| Preceded by Yehya Ibrahim Pasha | Prime Minister of Egypt; 1924 | Succeeded by Ahmad Ziwar Pasha |
