= Denshway Museum =

Coordinates: 30°36′07″N 30°51′13″E

- متحف دنشواي
- Established: July 1999
- Location: Denshawai, Al-Minufiyah, Egypt
- Type: History museum

The Denshway Museum is a museum in Denshawai, Al-Minufiyah, Egypt. It was established to commemorate the Denshawai incident.

== Establishment ==
The museum, which opened in July 1999, commemorates the Denshawai incident, a confrontation between five British Army officers and Egyptian citizens over the officers hunting of local pigeons which the villagers grew for food. The museum honours the four villagers of Denshawai who were hanged on 26 June 1906 after being sentenced at a trial two dates later.

== Museum idea ==
In creating the museum, it was hoped to remind villagers of the history that helped to shape the region and also to provide a cultural center which would increase tourism in the region.

== Museum design ==
The museum's design is that of an Egyptian pigeon tower, referring to the incident being sparked by the officers hunting pigeons for sport. The building has three levels, connected by stone spiral stairs. The museum includes a replica of the gallows, paintings and sculptures that tell the story of the incident as it unfolded, five exhibition halls and public space.
