= Agricultural Museum, Egypt =

Coordinates: 30°2′48″N 31°12′32″E

Agricultural Museum المتحف الزراعي
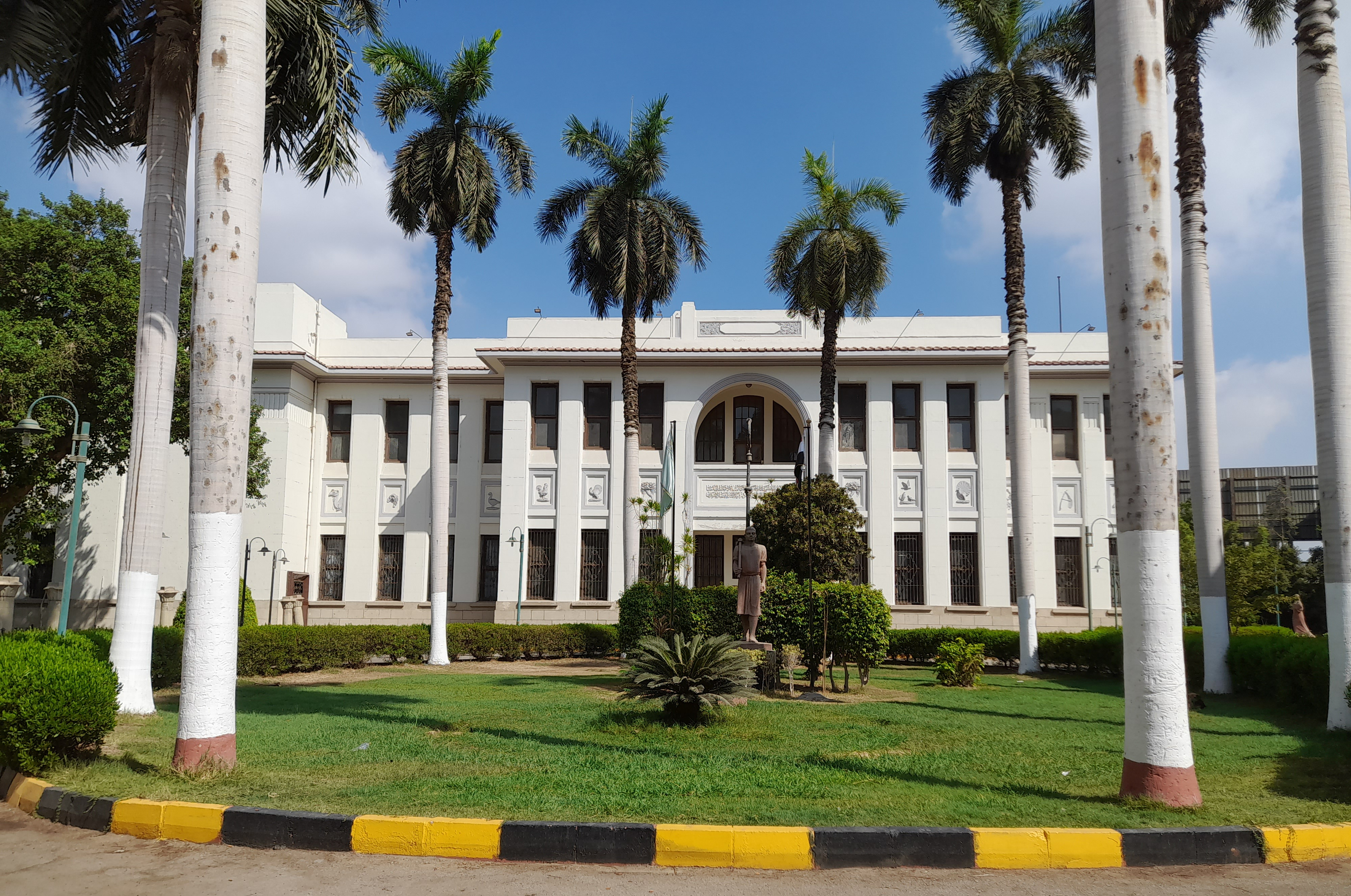
- Museum main building facade
- Established: 1938; 88 years ago
- Location: Dokki, Giza, Egypt
- Type: Agricultural museum
- Website: Official website

The Agricultural Museum is a museum in Giza, Egypt.

== History and profile ==
The Palace of Princess Fatima, the daughter of Khedive Ismail, was chosen to be remodeled to house the museum, and construction of the museum started in November 1930. During the planning of the museum the director of Hungary's Royal Agricultural Museum directed the work. A Hungarian national, Ivan Nagy, was the first director of the museum which was opened in 1938. It was the first agricultural museum in the world (after the Hungarian museum).

The museum is made up of separate museums: the museum of Ancient Egyptian agriculture; museum of scientific models; museum of plant wealth; Syria museum; the Greek, Roman, Coptic, and Islamic museum; and the cotton museum. In addition to the museum buildings there are also gardens with trees and rare plants and greenhouses.

== See also ==
- List of museums in Egypt
