= Karanis Site Museum =

Coordinates: 29.518598°N 30.898527°E

- Established: 1974; 52 years ago
- Location: Tamiya, Faiyum, Egypt
- Type: archaeological museum
- Collection size: 300+ artifacts

Karanis Site Museum, also known as Kom Aushim Museum, (Arabic: متحف كوم أوشيم) is an archaeological museum located in Tamiya, Faiyum Governorate, Lower Egypt. It is situated directly adjacent to the archaeological site of Karanis.

This was the site of the ancient city of Shedt, which later became Arsinoe, the city of the crocodiles, and is the present-day city of Faiyum. The artifacts on display are among the few remaining physical remains of the important city and its temple dedicated to Sobek, the chief crocodile god of Faiyum.

== Overview ==
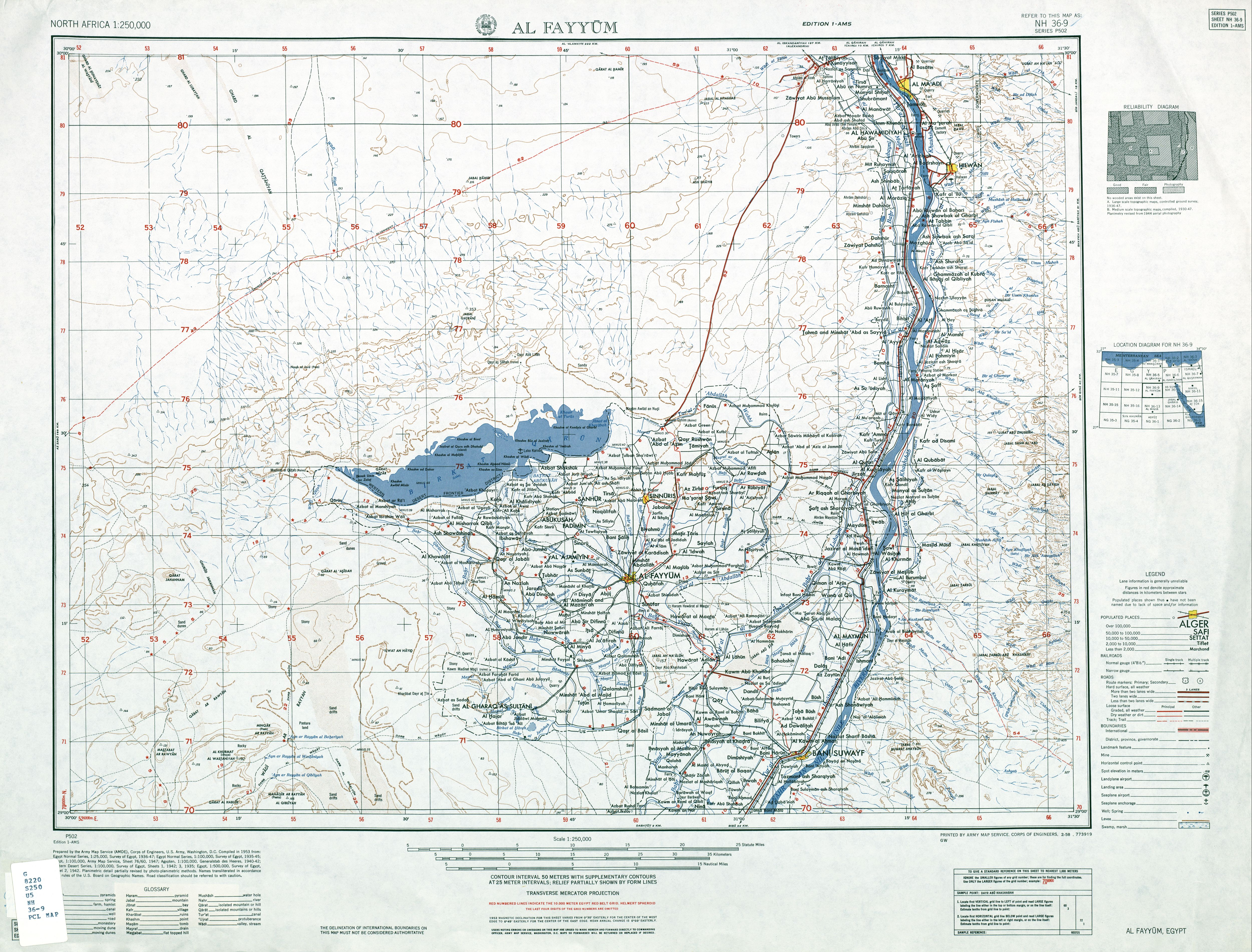
Map sheet showing Faiyum Oasis site

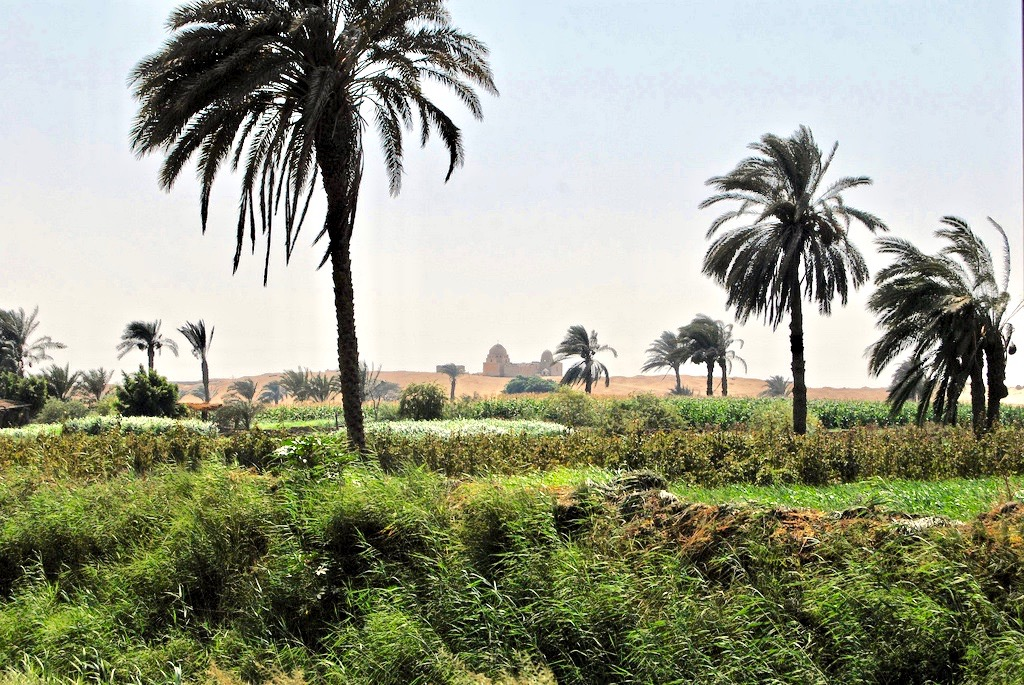
A scenic view of Faiyum Oasis archaeology region

The museum displays ancient Egyptian relics from Crocodilopolis and the Faiyum Oasis archaeological region. It covers the history of the Faiyum Governorate, customs and traditions, and religious beliefs. The museum has two floors which contain 313 artifacts which date back to pre-history. Originally built in 1974, it underwent a restoration and reopened in 2017.

The museum houses rare mummy portraits, which are lifelike paintings on wood or linen covering mummies, reflecting a blend of Egyptian and Roman funerary customs. The surrounding Karanis site includes an open-air display of stone sculptures and architectural fragments, including a red granite column, found during excavations.

== See also ==
- Fayum mummy portraits
- List of museums in Egypt
