= Denshawai incident =

1906 scandal in British-occupied Egypt

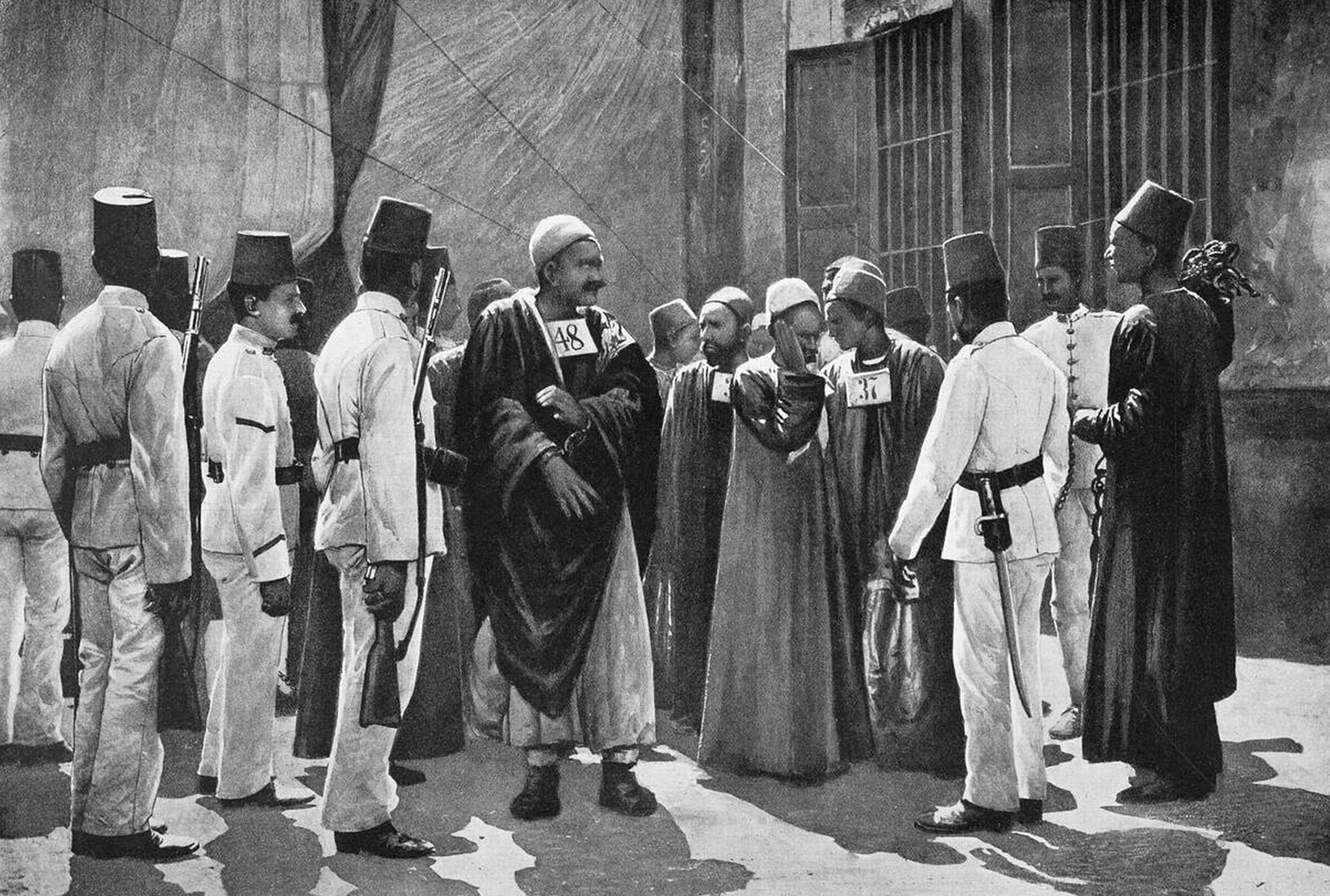
Egyptian prisoners condemned to death after the incident

The Denshawai incident is the name given to a dispute which occurred in 1906 between five British Army officers and Egyptian villagers in Denshawai which played a major role in opposition to the British occupation of Egypt. It is considered by some historians, such as Peter Mansfield who wrote The British in Egypt (1971), to mark a turning point in the history of Egypt under the British. Though it was fairly minor in terms of the number of casualties and injuries, the British authorities' response to the incident and the significant consequences led to it having a lasting impact. The incident has been commemorated by the establishment of the Denshway Museum.

== Background ==
There were many tensions that led up to the Denshawai incident. The Egyptian public had had a growing sense of nationalism long before the British occupation of Egypt in 1882 and the Urabi revolt. The revolt, led by and named after Ahmad Urabi, was motivated by a desire to liberate Egypt from the Khedival regime of Tewfik Pasha; it led to the Anglo-Egyptian War. The Egyptian government was taken over and directed by the British official Evelyn Baring, 1st Earl of Cromer. He was in charge of economic reforms and worked to eliminate the debt caused by the Khedival regime primarily during the reign Ismail Pasha. The success of these reforms was mainly enjoyed by the Egyptian upper classes. Since the end of the Khedival regime, the upper classes, who were mostly ethnic Turks, were the primary beneficiaries of British rule. The Egyptian middle class, on the hand, did not benefit from the new regime and believed that Britain did not take enough measures to deal with the Khedival regime's corruption. Positions in the Egyptian government were filled by Britons, and Egyptian nationalists argued that those positions could have been easily filled by capable, educated Egyptians and further increased their opposition to British rule.

== Incident ==
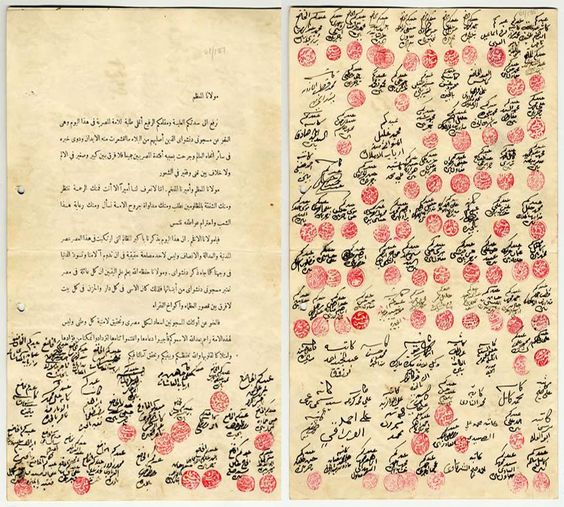
Egyptian Pashas and Beys appeal for forgiveness of the Denshway incident prisoners to the Khedive

The incident was reported in The Egyptian Gazette, which was under a British editor, Rowland Snelling. Cromer, the Consul-General of Egypt, actively influenced the reporting and publication of news articles in the newspaper.

At 1 pm, on 13 June 1906, five British Army officers, Captain Bull, Lieutenant Smithwick, Captain Bostock, Lieutenant Porter and Major Pine-Coffin, set off to hunt pigeons at the village of Denshawai. Pine-Coffin had hunted in the area before without incident. Along the way, they were met by Egyptian villagers who warned them in Arabic not to hunt pigeons in the area, though the five officers ignored them. After the officers started hunting, the villagers became angered as the pigeons were cultivated by them as a source of food. A fire broke out, which the Egyptians accused the officers of starting through negligent discharge of their firearms. The villagers became increasingly aggressive towards the five Britons and eventually a scuffle broke out; one of the officers' guns went off after the villagers attempted to seize it, wounding four Egyptians.

One of the British officers managed to escape from the scene and fled back on foot towards his camp in the intense noontime heat. He later collapsed outside the camp and died, most likely of heatstroke. An Egyptian villager who found him there tried to assist the officer, but when other soldiers from the camp saw the villager alongside the body of the dead officer, they assumed that he had murdered the officer, and killed him in turn.

== The trial ==
Once Cromer heard of the incident, he decided to use it to "as a way of teaching the locals to respect British authority and teach the fellaheen (Egyptian peasants) a lesson." Additionally, Major-General Bullock, the Commanding Officer of the Army of Occupation, requested that the accused be tried under Khedival Decree rather than the reformed Egyptian penal code introduced by the British. The decree was established in 1895 to "deal very swiftly and summarily" with crimes by Egyptians against British officials and servicemen, and allowed more severe punishments than was possible under the new penal code. On 14 June, Egyptian police arrested 52 men in the village identified as being involved in the scuffle. Five judges were assigned to adjudicate: Egyptian Minister of Justice Boutros Ghali, Ahmad Fathy Zaghlul, William Hayter, Lieutenant-Colonel Ludlow, and Mr. Bond.

The trial was ten days later on 24 June; no minutes were taken. The defendants were indicted under charges of pre-meditated murder and robbery with violence. All 52 defendants testified for a total of 34 minutes, barely enough time to state their names and alibis. Hassan Aly Mahfouz (the owner of the pigeons), Youssef Hussein Selim, El Sayed Issa Salem, and Mohamed Darweesh Zahran, were convicted of pre-meditated murder of the officer who had died of heatstroke, with the claim that their actions had put him in that deadly position. It was necessary to convict them with pre-mediated murder in order to sentence them to death. It was reported in the Al Muqattam at the time that gallows were erected in Denshawai before the trial was concluded. 12 other defendants were found guilty and sentenced to various prison terms; eight defendants were sentenced to be whipped 50 times.

Hassan was hanged in front of his own house and family, which was uncharacteristic of the usual protocol in capital punishment. This decision sparked outrage among the Egyptian public and was described by the nationalist press as being especially cruel and an "outright symbol of tyranny". Darweesh's last words from the gallows were: "May God compensate us well for this world of meanness, for this world of injustice, for this world of cruelty".

== Aftermath ==
Some Egyptian leaders later affirmed that the incident, and the British response to it, led them to suppose that co-operation with the British Empire was "totally unacceptable" and impossible. The belief that co-operation was impossible increased their concerns about British pressure to widen the franchise in Egypt, and caused them to push harder for the removal of British forces from Egypt. On 20 February 1910, Ghali, one of the five judges in the trial, was shot by Ibrahim Nassif al-Wardani, a twenty-three-year-old pharmacology graduate who had just returned from Britain. Ghali was leaving the ministry of foreign affairs when Wardani fired five shots, three of which lodged in the premier's body. Ghali died the next day, on 21 February. Wardani's motives included the Denshawai incident, in which he accused Ghali of favouring the British. The assassination of Ghali was the first public assassination of a senior statesman in Egypt in more than a century (since Jean-Baptiste Kléber), and also the first of a series of assassinations that continued until 1915.

By 1919, Egypt was ripe for revolt. The Allies organized the Versailles Conference to remake a post-war arrangement. The Egyptian delegation, known as the Wafd, was denied attendance to the conference. This denial led to the resignation of most of the Egyptian government and mass demonstrations and riots. These events provided the Egyptian nationalists with a wider base of support than was hitherto achieved in the prewar decades. This decision was used by national and anti-foreign elements to inflame public opinion in Egypt. Britons who called the tribunal and its legality into question, were accused of being unpatriotic and supporting the "venal agitators" in Egypt. Guy Aldred, who in 1907 compared the execution of Madan Lal Dhingra with the immunity given to the British officers in this incident, was sentenced to twelve months' hard labour for publishing The Indian Sociologist.

George Bernard Shaw, in the preface to his play John Bull's Other Island, gave the public more of his view of the incident. In a passage more noted for its picturesque description than for its literal accuracy, he stated:

[T]hey had room for only one man on the gallows, and had to leave him hanging half an hour to make sure [he was dead] and give his family plenty of time to watch him swinging, thus having two hours to kill as well as four men, they kept the entertainment going by flogging eight men with fifty lashes each.

He then went on in the same vein:

If her [Britain's] empire means ruling the world as Denshawai has been ruled in 1906 – and that, I am afraid, is what the Empire does mean to the main body of our aristocratic-military caste and to our Jingo plutocrats – then there can be no more sacred and urgent political duty on earth than the disruption, defeat, and suppression of the Empire, and, incidentally, the humanization of its supporters…

Fifty years later, the Egyptian journalist Mohamed Hassanein Heikal said "the pigeons of Denshawai have come home to roost", to describe the aftermath of the Suez Crisis in 1956. "The Hanging of Zahran" is a poem by Salah Abdel Sabour about the incident. Nagui Riad made the film Friend of Life, based on the poem. "27 June 1906, 2:00 pm" is a related poem by Constantine P. Cavafy, that starts: "When the Christians took and hanged/ the innocent boy of seventeen/ his mother who there beside the scaffold/ had dragged herself..." The incident is mentioned in Ken Follett's 1980 spy novel The Key to Rebecca, and in The Falcon at the Portal by Elizabeth Peters, both set in Egypt.

== See also ==
- Denshway Museum
- Ahmad Fathy Zaghlul

== Bibliography ==
- "Why Haditha Reminds This Historian of an Awful Chapter in British History". History News Network. 5 June 2006. By Keith David Watenpaugh
- Fahmy, Ziad. Ordinary Egyptians: Creating the Modern Nation through Popular Culture. Stanford, CA: Stanford University Press, 2011.ISBN 0804772126
