= Museum of Tal Basta Antiquities =

Archaeological museum located in Zagazig, Egypt

- Established: 2006
- Location: Zagazig, Egypt
- Coordinates: 30.5735°N 31.5147°E
- Collection size: 1,000

The Museum of Tal Basta Antiquities is an archaeological museum located in Zagazig, Egypt. It contains artifacts from Tell Basta and the entire Sharqia Governorate. The museum has two main areas: an open-air museum and a single-floor building that houses up to 1,000 artifacts.

The open-air garden includes a statue of Princess Meritamen, the daughter and later Great Royal Wife of Ramesses II. The museum collection also contains several artifacts related to Bastet, a cat deity who was the main goddess of the region.

== History ==
The museum was created as a replacement for the National Museum of Sharqeya in 2006. Construction of the museum was completed in 2010, however the design of the building's interior was paused until 2017, and the museum opened in 2018.

== Gallery ==
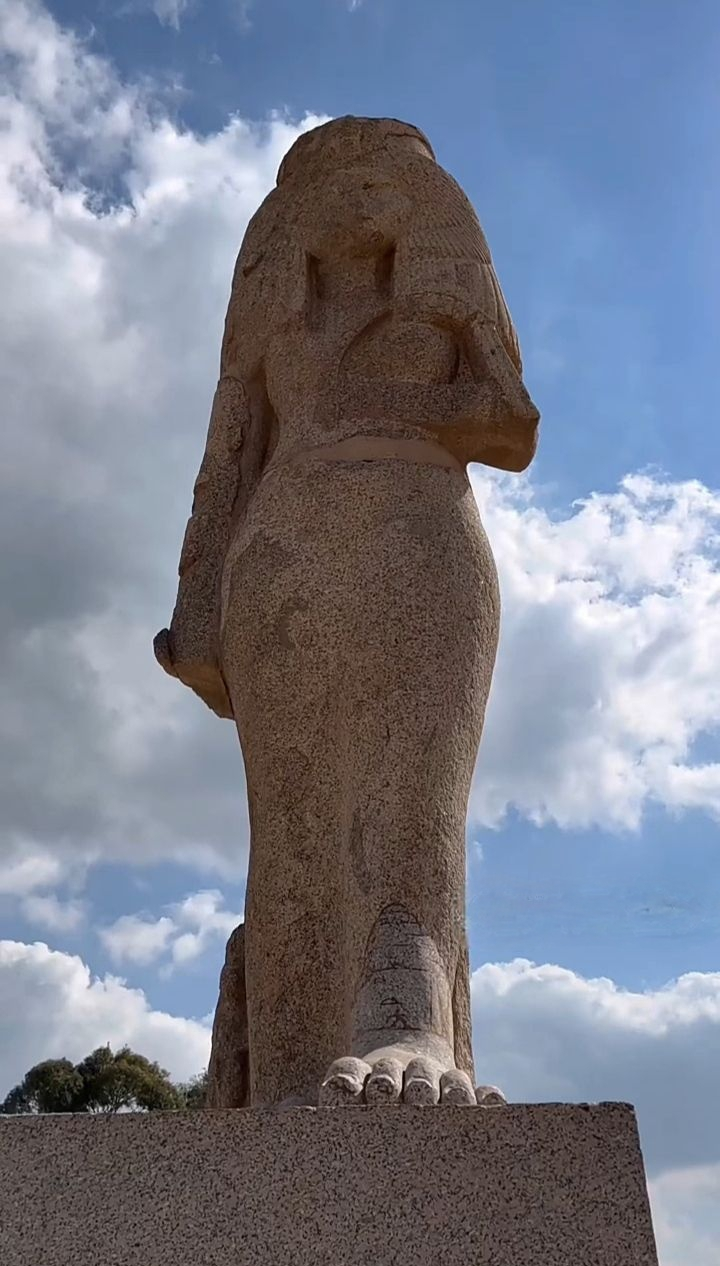
Princess Meritamen

== See also ==
- List of museums in Egypt
