= Ahmad Fathy Zaghlul =

Egyptian politician (1863–1914)

Ahmad Fathy Zaghlul (1863–1914) was an Egyptian nationalist lawyer and politician. The brother of Saad Zaghloul, Fathy Zahlul studied law in Paris and wrote several law texts. He had several administrative and government posts, and at one point was Deputy Minister of Justice.

In 1906 he was amongst the Egyptian judges at the summary trial for the Denshawai Incident, which damaged his popular reputation in Egypt.

An anti-populist liberal, Fathy Zaghlul also translated several works of European social science into Arabic, including À quoi tient la supériorité des Anglo-Saxons? by Edmond Demolins. A translation of Herbert Spencer's The Man Versus the State was left unfinished and unpublished at his death.

== Works ==
=== Translations ===
- (1892) Arabic translation of An Introduction to the Principles of Morals and Legislation by Jeremy Bentham
- (1898) Arabic translation of L'Islam, impressions et études by Henri de la Croix de Castries
- (1899) Arabic translation of À quoi tient la supériorité des Anglo-Saxons? by Edmond Demolins
- (1909) Arabic translation of Psychologie des Foules by Gustave Le Bon
- (1921) Arabic translation of Lois psychologiques de l'évolution des peuples by Gustave Le Bon
