= Karanis =

Archaeological site in the Egyptian depression of el-Faiyum

Coordinates: 29°31′04″N 30°54′12″E

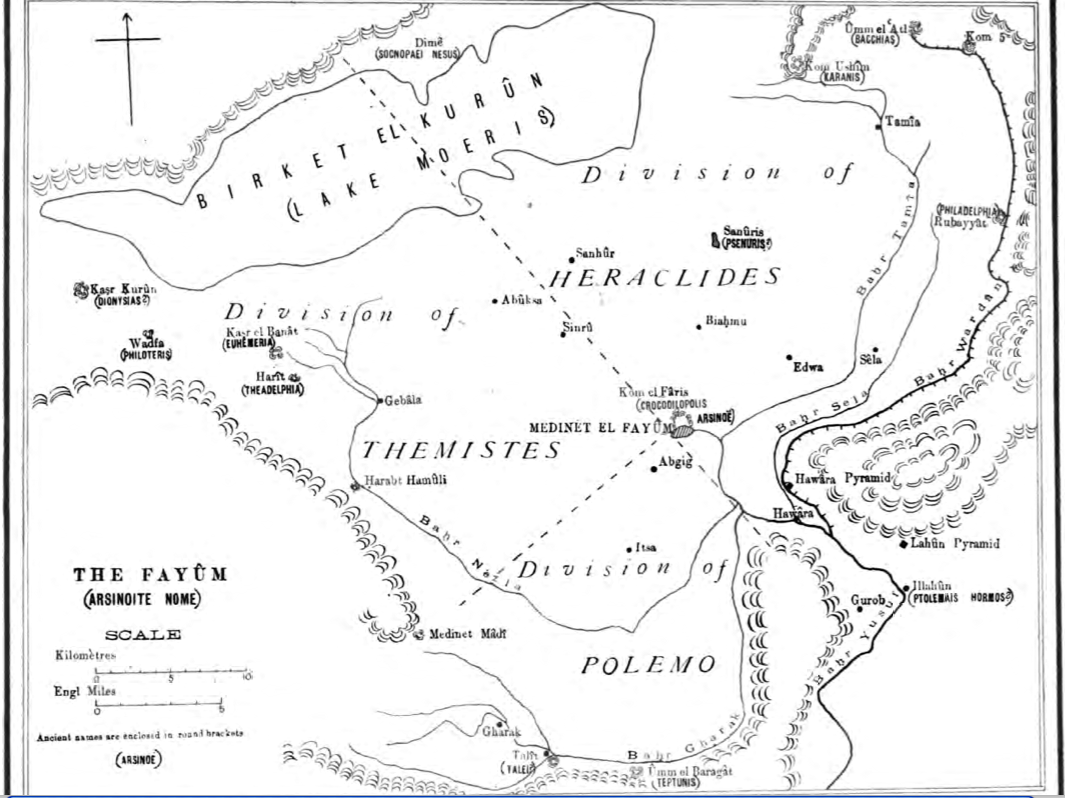
Map of Fayum from 1895

Karanis (Koine Greek: Καρανίς), located in what is now Kom Aushim, was an agricultural town in Ptolemaic and Roman Egypt located in the northeast corner of the Faiyum Oasis. It was roughly 60 hectares in size and its peak population is estimated to be 4000 people, although it could have been as much as three times greater.

Karanis was one of a number of towns in the Arsinoites nome established in the third century BC by Ptolemy II Philadelphus. The town largely stagnated in the late Ptolemaic period, until in the first century BC it expanded north when Augustus, having conquered Egypt and also recognizing the Faiyum's agricultural potential, sent workers to clean up the canals and restore the dikes that had fallen into decline, restoring productivity to the area. Karanis was continuously occupied up until about the time of the seventh-century Sasanian conquest of Egypt, when it was gradually abandoned due to unclear causes.

== Structures ==
Beginning in 1924, large-scale excavations uncovered many structures on the site, including houses, granaries, a bath complex, and two significant temples.

=== South Temple ===
The south temple's origins can be traced back to as early as the first century BC and it was occupied until the late third or fourth century AD. The temple was dedicated under Nero to the crocodile related gods Pnepheros and Petesouchos. It is built in an Egyptian style, made of limestone blocks, and may have been built on the site of an earlier temple. In addition to shrine rooms and storage rooms, the north and south sides of the south temple contain houses and storerooms for the temple's priests. Local weddings and banquets could be held in the dining room in the temple's southeast corner.

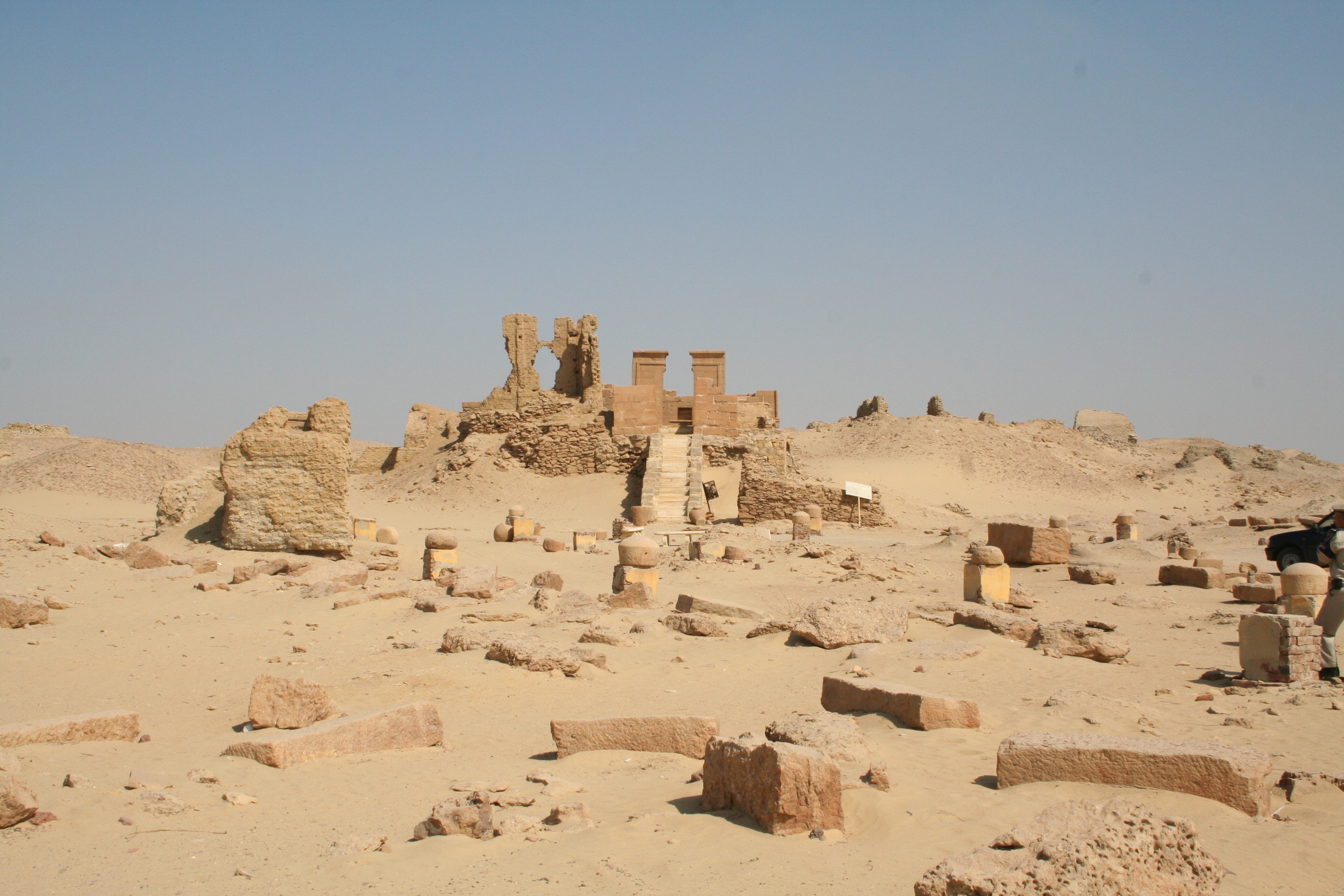
Modern ruins of Karanis

=== North Temple ===
The north temple was built in the early Roman period, and is made of limestone in Egyptian style. It is mostly undecorated, with the exception of Greco-Roman style engaged columns on the temple's outer corners and in each internal doorway. Though the temple has no inscription clearly stating its purpose, it is likely dedicated to a crocodile god, indicated by the presence of an altar that fits a crocodile mummy, and of a soft white limestone figure of a hawk-headed crocodile that likely represents the god Soknopaios. The temple also features an altar with the head of Serapis, Zeus, or a syncretism of the two.

== Conditions in the town ==
The Fayum towns were settled by Roman veterans after Augustus conquered Egypt, though the small number of Latin papyri found in Karanis (only two) and the overwhelming number of Greek papyri from or concerning these veterans from this period suggest that these new soldiers may not have been culturally Roman but instead Greek, or at the very least from the Eastern empire. "The peace and political stability brought by Augustus and kept alive by his successors, meant prosperity for generations of landholders at Karanis well into the second century.

In the late second century, and again in the second quarter of the third, there were notable recessions that mirrored difficulties experienced by the Empire at large. Some houses had been left to collapse by the end of the third century, and the latest papyrus samples recovered date to the early fifth century. As Karanis' dry conditions are ideal for the preservation of papyri, this was the main focus of early excavators, and led them to infer that the town was on the verge of abandonment by this time. However, recent radiocarbon dating of organic specimens such as stockpiled seeds indicates that the town remained consistently inhabited at least through the sixth century.

== Papyri ==
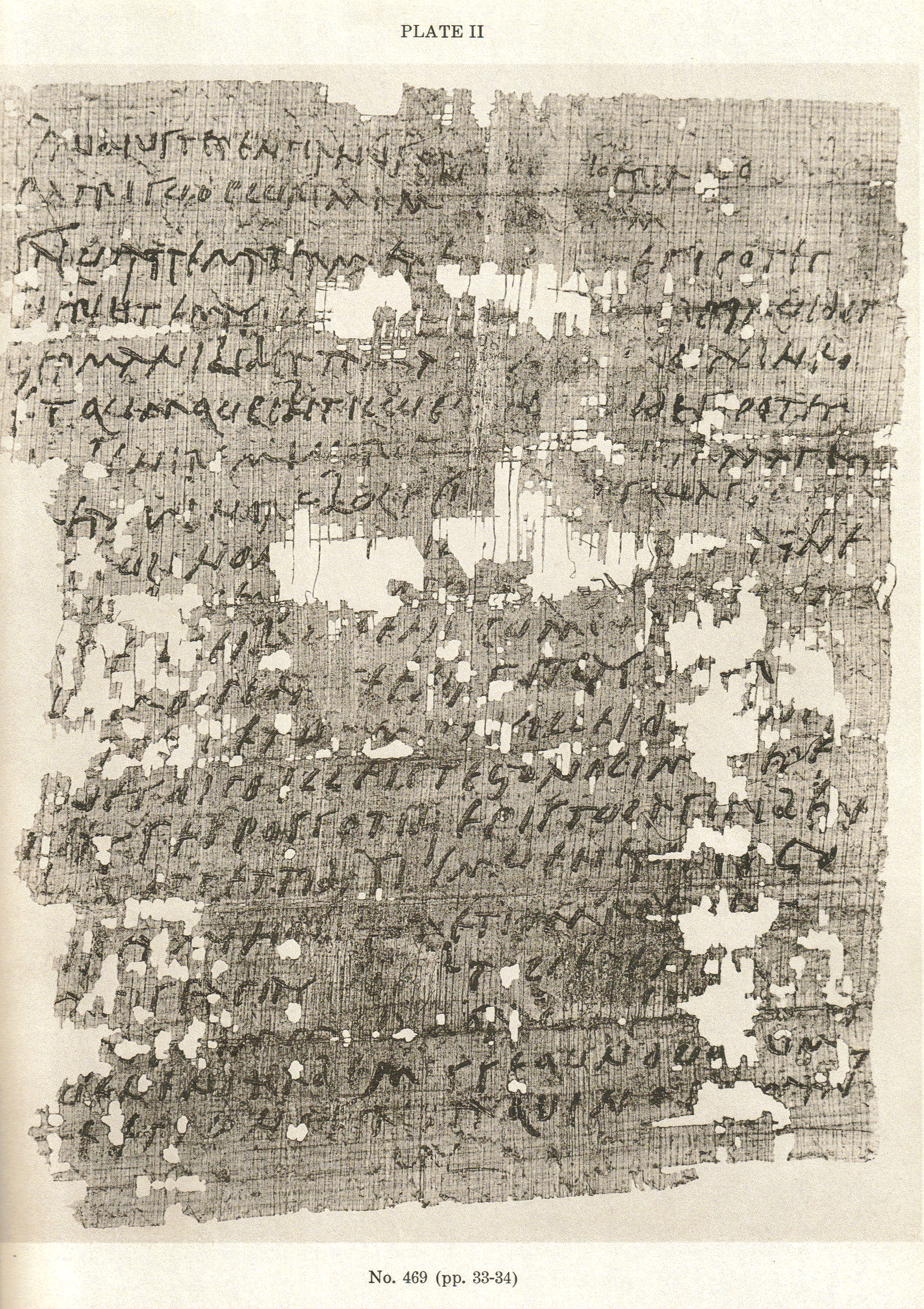
Letter from Terentianus to Tiberianus, Tiberianus given the military title of speculator. Latin.

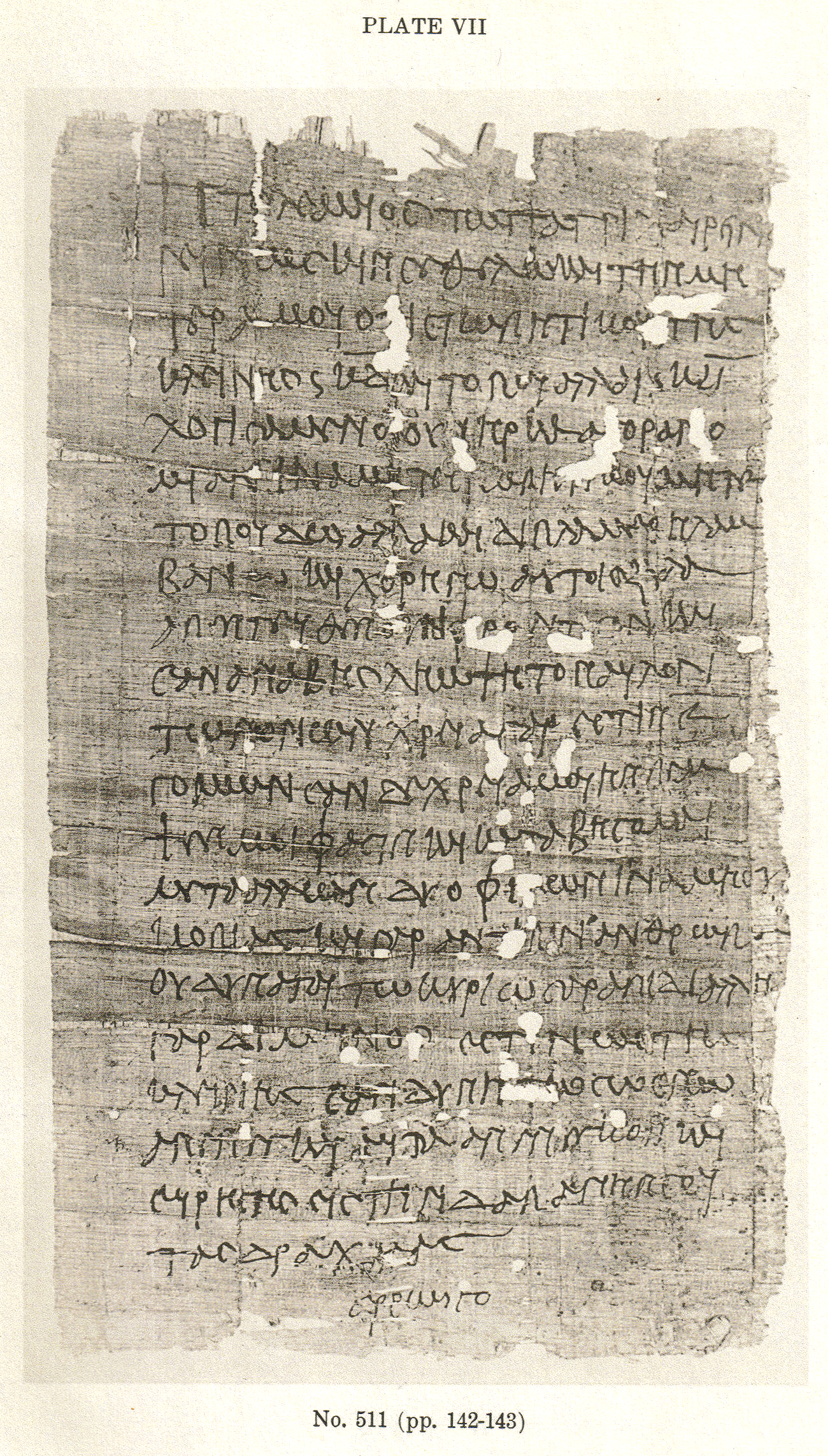
Letter from Prolemaeus, "refers to a cult banquet in honor of Sarapis" Greek.

The papyri excavated are historically significant in that they come from the same place and time, all dating from the period between the reign of Diocletian and the 370s. Also, with Karanis being a relatively poor town, the documents and artifacts excavated "[provide] a microcosm of life as it was lived by ordinary people in Egypt under Greek and Roman rule," and provide evidence of the whole of Egypt's relationship to the Empire of Rome. The papyri contain mostly tax records, which is how archaeologists have determined that Karanis and its veterans were mostly poor, self-sufficient farmers who did not have much contact with other towns in the region.

=== Excavations ===
In the late 19th and early 20th centuries, farmers would “obtain permits to remove soil from the Karanis mound to use as fertilizer (sebbakh)”, the organic decay making the soil very rich. This process destroyed the archaeological context in the process.

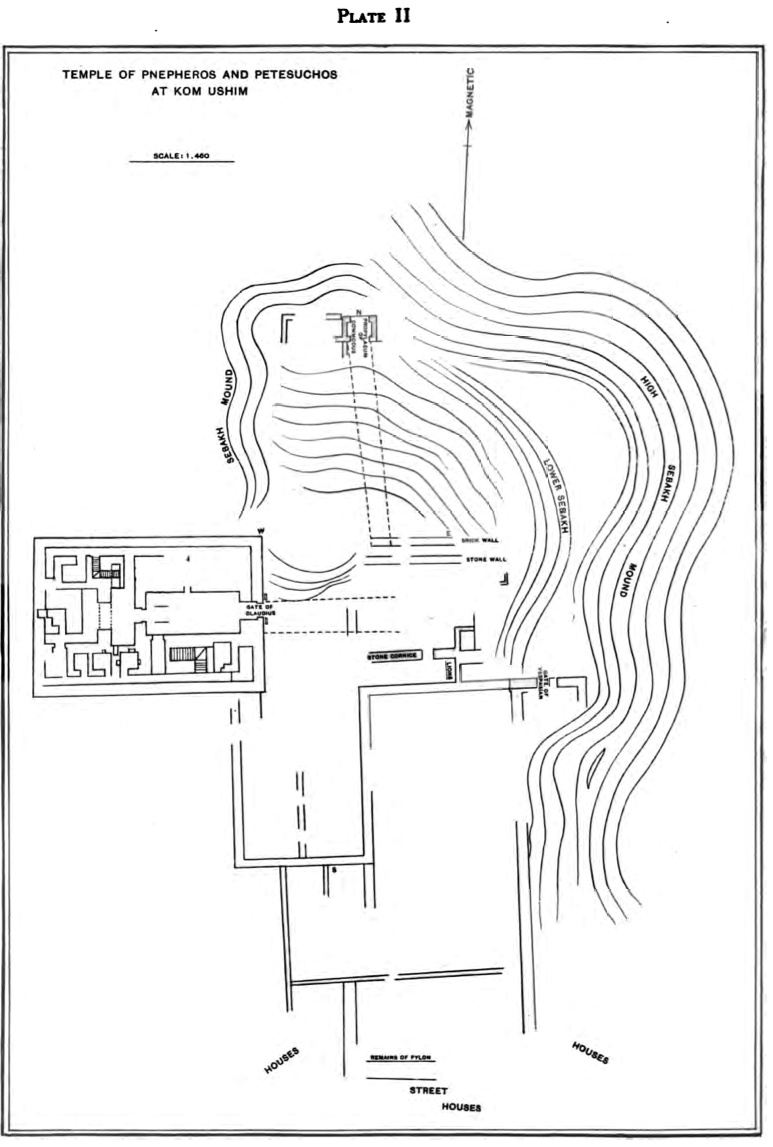
Drawing of South Temple from the Grenfell-Hunt excavation in 1895. Finding no papryi and no evidence existing from the Pharaonic times, Grenfell and Hunt moved to other areas of the Fayum.

The first scientific excavation was in 1895 by Bernard Pyne Grenfell and Arthur Surridge Hunt, though they felt the area had been too plundered to produce anything of much value. At this time in archaeology, papyri and other artifacts were often treated as items to collect. Also during this time (i.e., the late 19th and early 20th centuries), excavators were almost solely interested in artifacts dating to the older dynasties. Graeco-Roman sites such as Karanis continued to be plundered for sebbakh until Francis W. Kelsey, a professor of Latin language and literature at the University of Michigan, observed this devastation and received grants to search for an excavation site in 1924. Starting excavations of Karanis in 1925, his goal was to "increase exact knowledge rather than the amassing of collections", with a focus on common people. The papyri collected are now part of the University of Michigan Papyrus Collection. More recent excavations have been done by the Cairo University, the French Institute, Virginia Commonwealth University, and the URU Fayum Project (a collaboration of UCLA, the University of Groningen (RUG) in the Netherlands, and the University of Auckland)

The Kom Aushim Museum was built on the site in 1974, and displays some of the archaeological artifacts unearthed from Karanis and the surrounding Fayoum region.
