= Kharga Museum =

Coordinates: 25.45675°N 30.545838°E

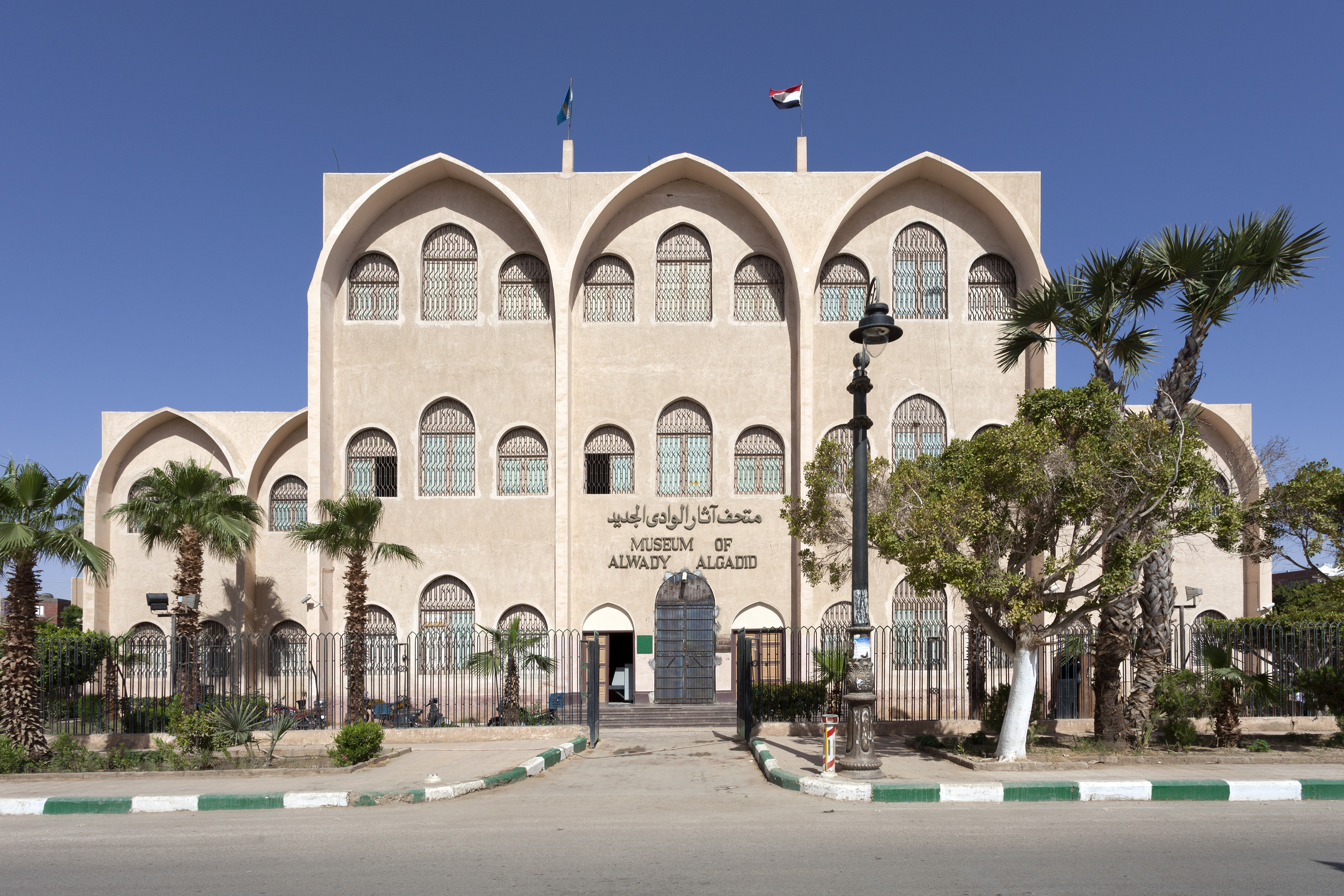
Kharga Museum

Kharga Museum is a two-storey museum which is designed to resemble the Necropolis architecture of Al Bagawat which is nearby. The museum displays the items that have been found in the Al Kharga and Dakhla oases. There are a variety of items like jewellery, tools and textiles. It also has artefacts from various eras like the Ottoman Era. The building is cavernous and is built from local bricks. Items are at the ground floor and first floor that cover artefacts documenting journey of human civilization that existed in Egyptian deserts.

== See also ==
- List of museums in Egypt
