= Zagazig =

Zagazig الزقازيق
- City
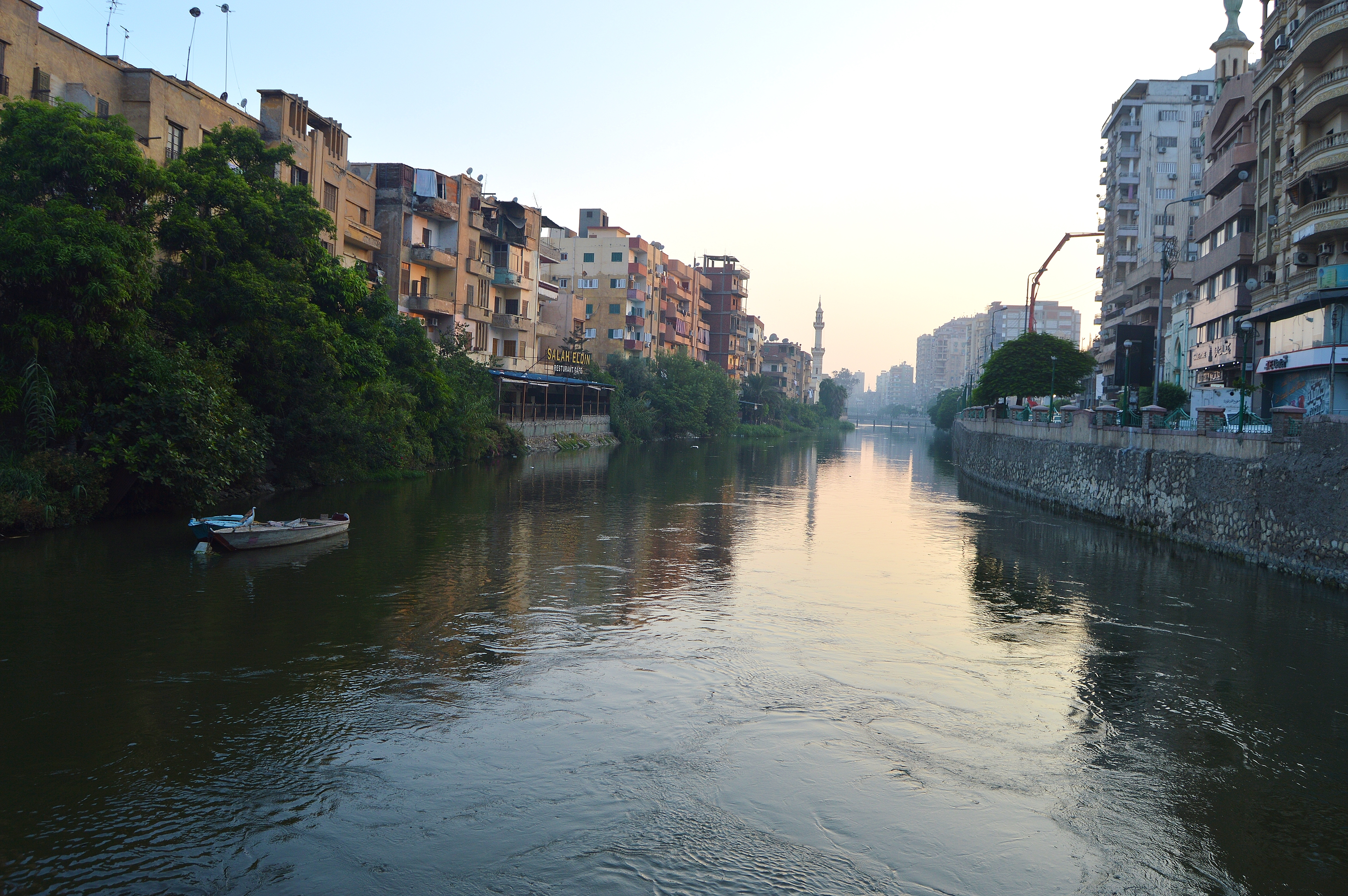
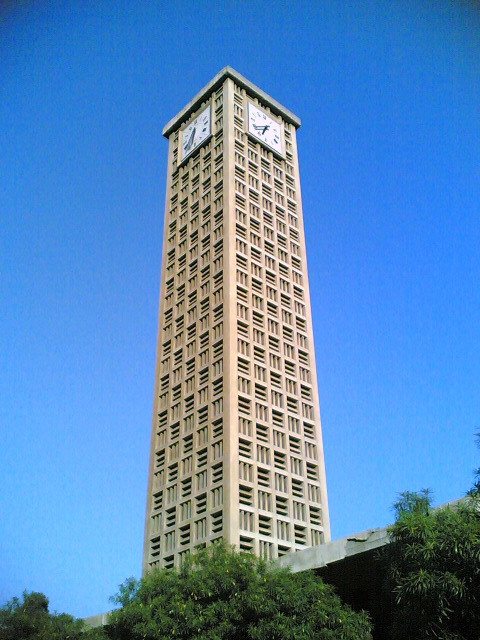
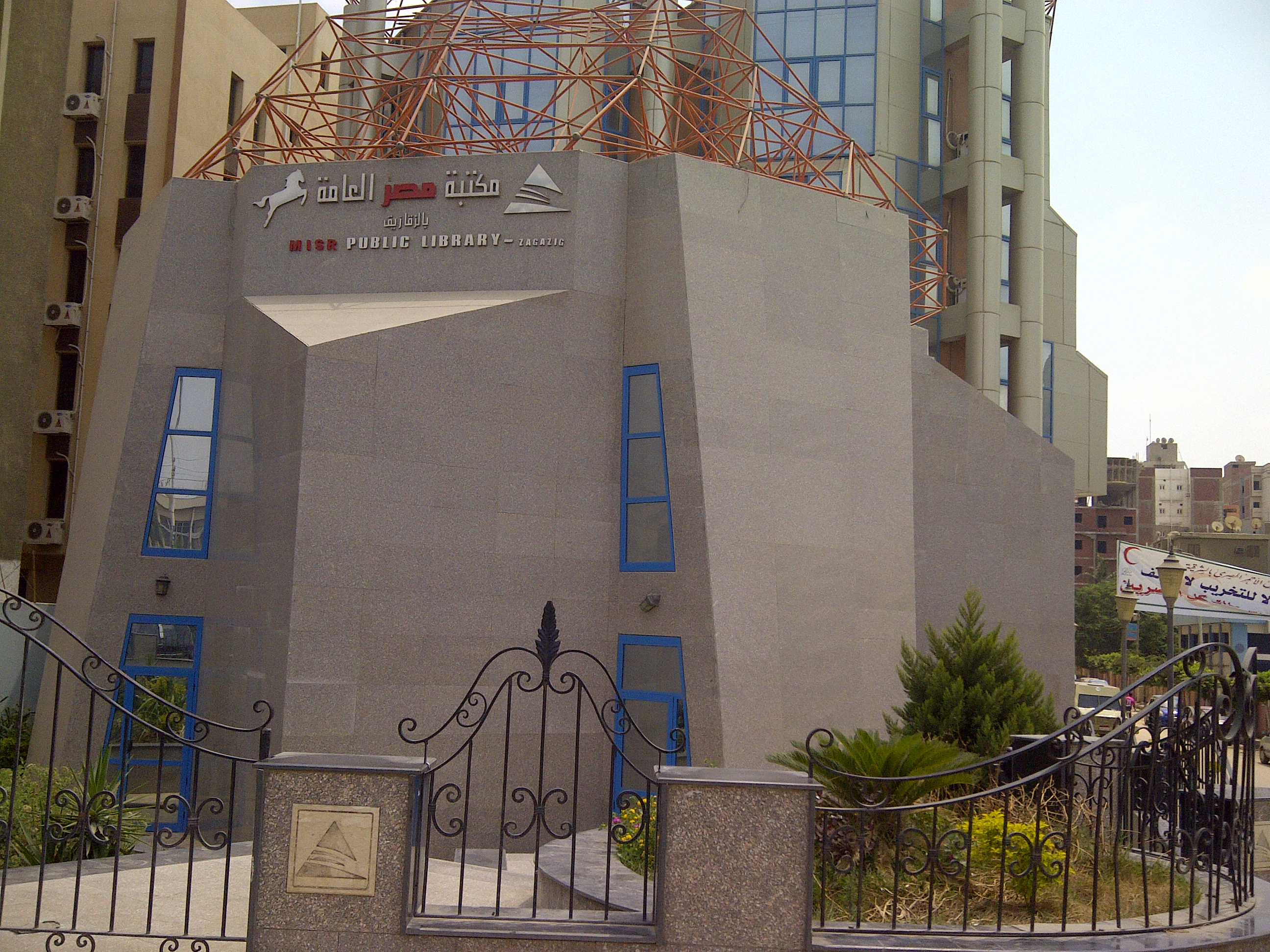
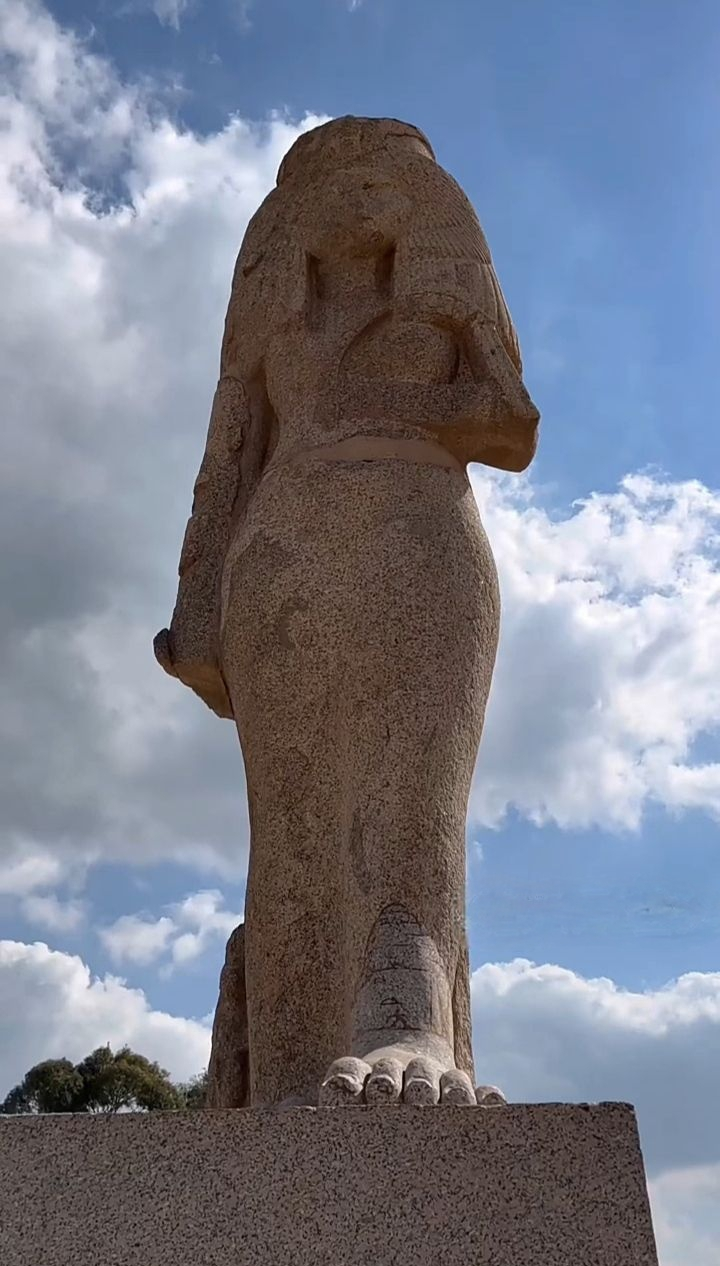
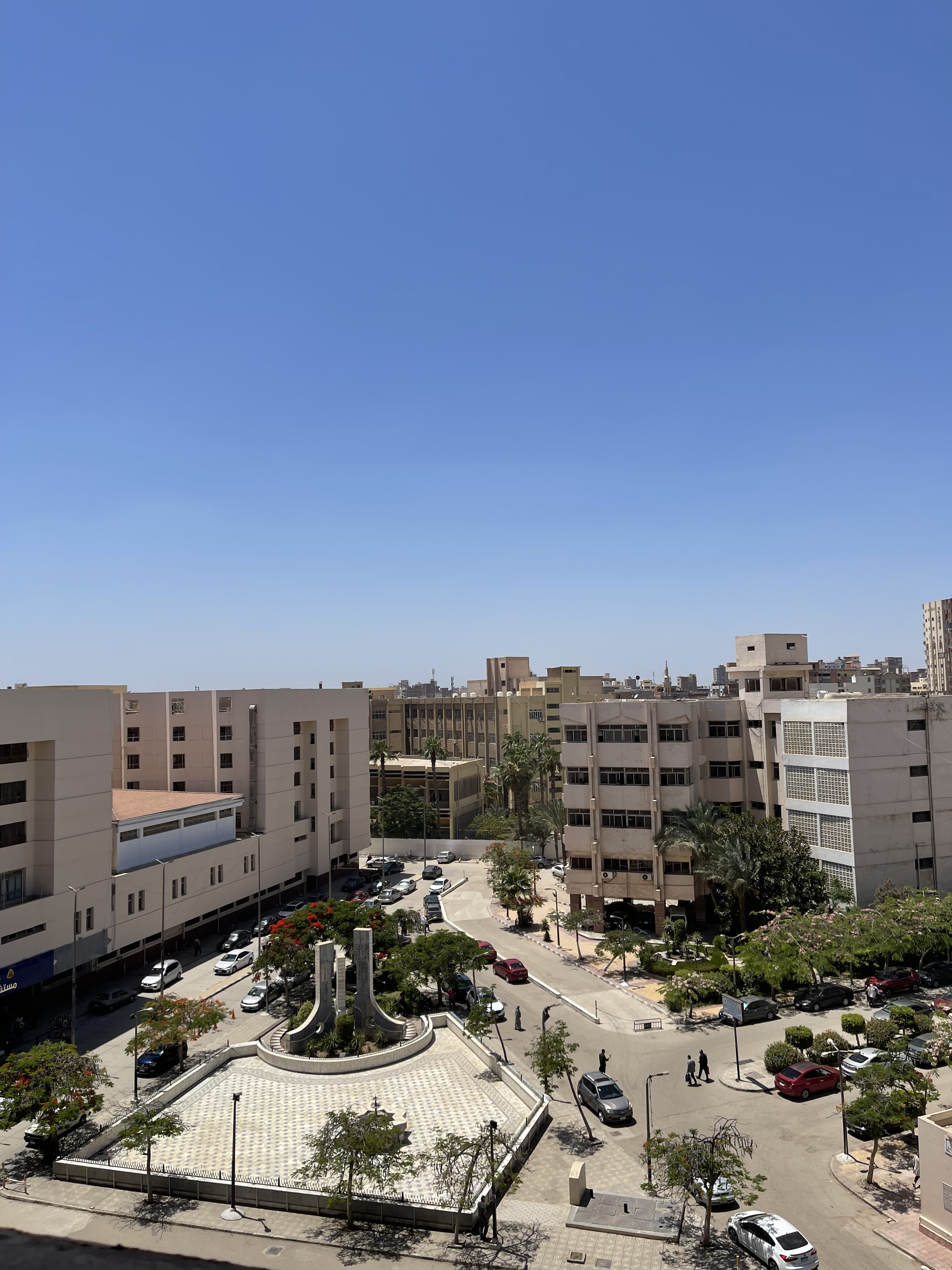
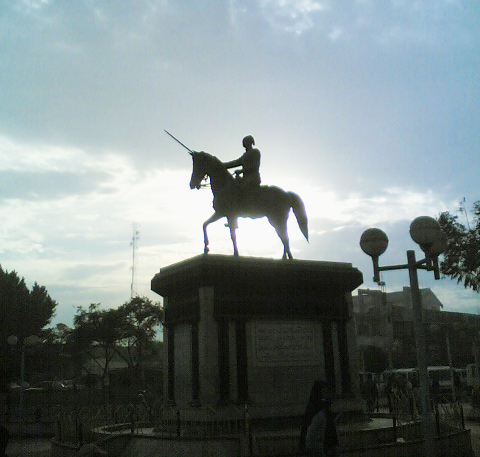
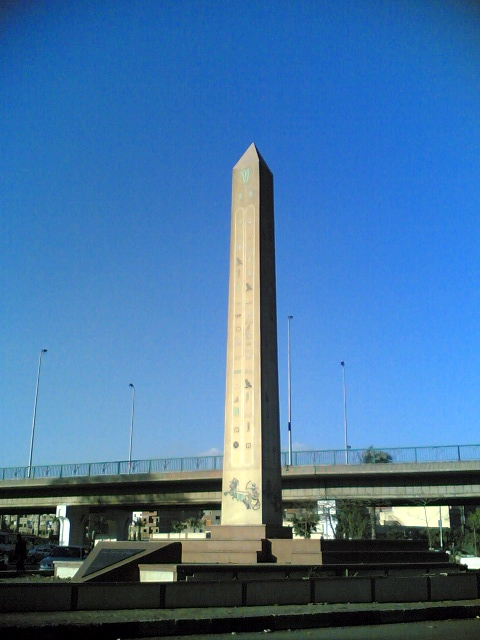
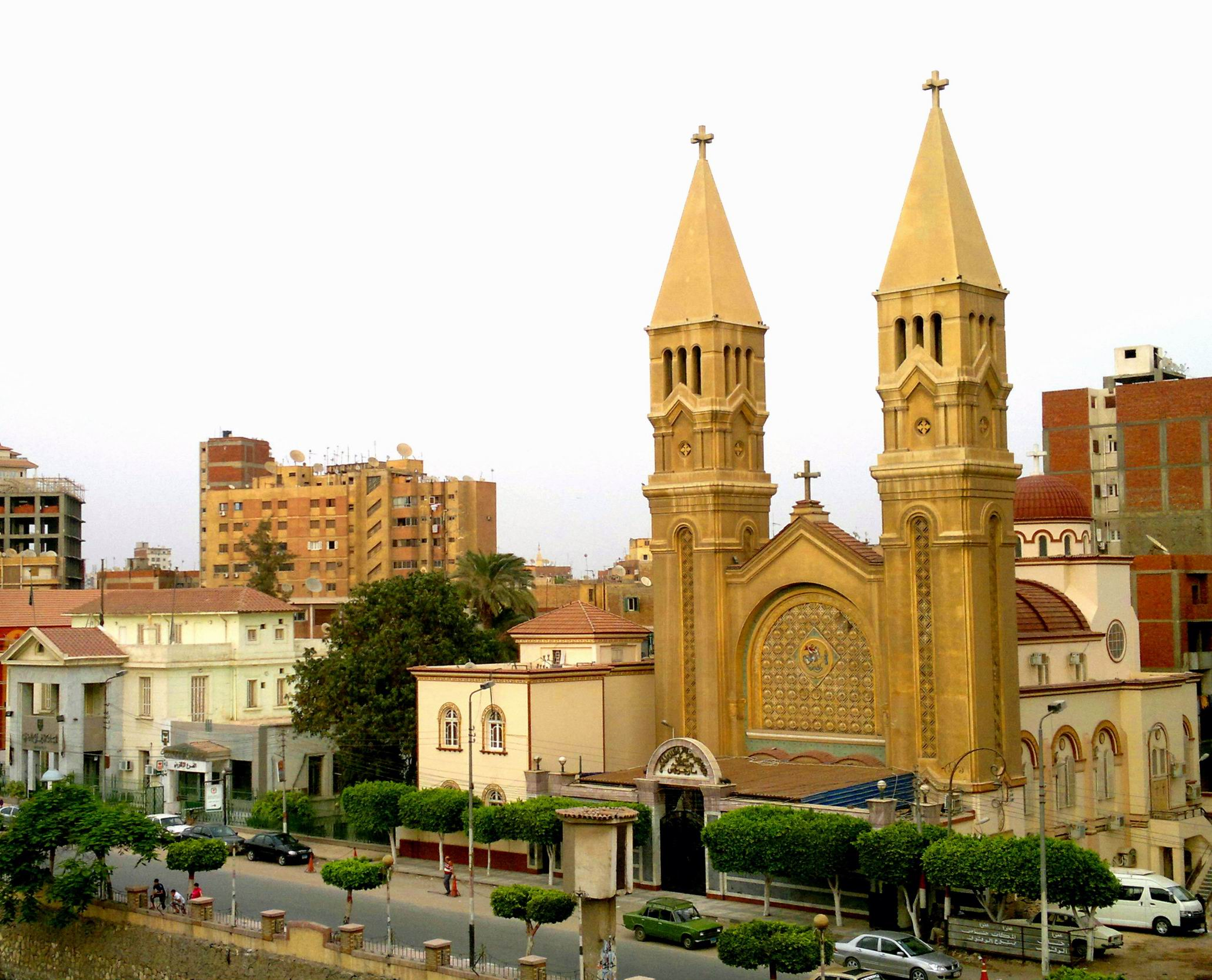
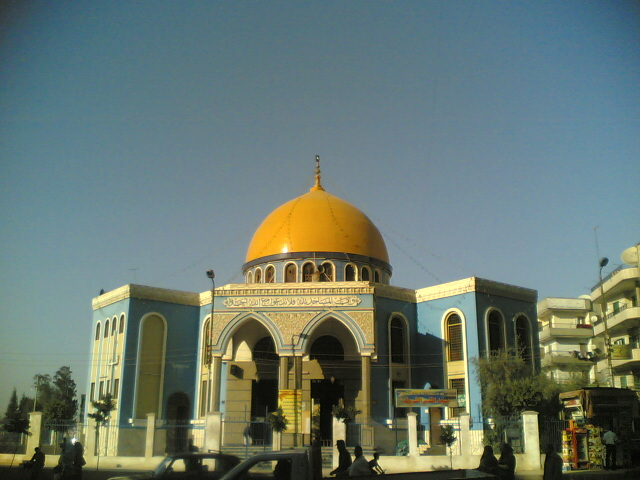
- The Nile Zagazig Clock Misr Public Library Statue of Meritamin Zagazig University Statue of Ahmed Urabi Egyptian Obelisk Mary Gerges Church El-Quds Mosque

- Location within Egypt
- Coordinates: 30°34′N 31°30′E
- Country: Egypt
- Governorate: Sharkia
- Founded: 1830

Area
  - Total: 14.0 km^{2} (5.4 sq mi)
- Elevation: 16 m (52 ft)

Population (2024)
  - Total: 380,000
  - Density: 27,000/km^{2} (70,000/sq mi)

GDP (nominal, constant 2015 values)
  - Year: 2024
  - Total: $2.3 billion
  - Per capita: $6,053
- Time zone: UTC+2 (EET)
  - Summer (DST): UTC+3 (EEST)
- Area code: +20 (55)

Zagazig (Egyptian Arabic pronunciation: [ez.zæʔæˈziːʔ], locally [ez.zæɡæˈziːɡ]) is a city in Egypt. Situated in the eastern part of the Nile delta, it is the capital of the governorate of Sharkia. It is located on the Muweis Canal and is a hub of the corn and cotton trade. The city contains the Museum of Tal Basta Antiquities, including archaeological exhibits.

The city is home to Zagazig University, founded in 1974, one of the largest universities in Egypt, with colleges in different fields of science and arts. The Archaeological Museum of the University of Zagazig exhibits significant finds from the nearby sites, Bubastis (Tell Basta) and Kufur Nigm. The most notable streets in Zagazig are Farouk Street, Government Street, Abu Hamad and El Kawmia Street.

== History ==
The city was founded in the 19th century on the site of a village called Nazlat az-Zaqāzīq which was named after the Zaqzuq family. The family's name itself comes from a dialectal word zaqzuq or ziqziq which means "A small creature" (e.g. a fish or a mouse) and comes from a Coptic word ϫⲉⲕϫⲓⲕ "Ant or other insect".

The ruins of the ancient Egyptian city of Bubastis are located 3 kilometres (1.9 mi) southeast of town. Bubastis was the ancient capital of the 18th nome, and is home to the feast celebrating the cat goddess Bastet.

Bubastis is the Greek version of the Egyptian language name Pr-Bastet "House [Temple] of Bastet". Bubastis became the capital of Egypt in the 22nd and 23rd Dynasties. There are remains of the temples built by Osorkon II and Nectanebo II. Catacombs where the sacred cats were buried are located behind the remains of an Old Kingdom chapel from the period of Pepi I Meryre.

== Geography ==
=== Climate ===
Köppen-Geiger climate classification system classifies its climate as hot desert (BWh), as the rest of Egypt.

Climate data for Zagazig
Month	Jan	Feb	Mar	Apr	May	Jun	Jul	Aug	Sep	Oct	Nov	Dec	Year
Mean daily maximum °C (°F)	20.0 (68.0)	21.1 (70.0)	23.9 (75.0)	27.8 (82.0)	32.2 (90.0)	33.9 (93.0)	35.0 (95.0)	33.9 (93.0)	32.2 (90.0)	30.0 (86.0)	26.1 (79.0)	22.2 (72.0)	28.2 (82.8)
Daily mean °C (°F)	12.2 (54.0)	12.3 (54.1)	15.0 (59.0)	18.9 (66.0)	22.2 (72.0)	26.1 (79.0)	27.2 (81.0)	27.2 (81.0)	23.9 (75.0)	22.2 (72.0)	17.8 (64.0)	15.0 (59.0)	20.0 (68.0)
Mean daily minimum °C (°F)	5.8 (42.4)	6.5 (43.7)	8.5 (47.3)	11.4 (52.5)	15.1 (59.2)	17.8 (64.0)	19.6 (67.3)	19.7 (67.5)	17.9 (64.2)	16.0 (60.8)	12.8 (55.0)	8.1 (46.6)	13.3 (55.9)
Average rainfall mm (inches)	9 (0.4)	10 (0.4)	6 (0.2)	2 (0.1)	2 (0.1)	0 (0)	0 (0)	0 (0)	0 (0)	2 (0.1)	4 (0.2)	10 (0.4)	45 (1.9)
Average relative humidity (%)	83	79	75	67	60	62	68	73	78	80	82	83	74
Source: Arab Meteorology Book

== Notable people ==
- The Abaza family, the largest family in Sharqia and Egypt's largest Circassian community.
- Farouk El-Baz, space scientist and geologist
- Abdelhalim Hafez, Egyptian singer and actor
- Ahmed Urabi, colonel who led the revolt against the British in 1882
- Carmen Suleiman, singer
- Mohamed Morsi, the fifth president of Egypt
- Salama Moussa, Coptic Egyptian journalist, philosopher and social critic
- Ahmed Zaki, actor
- John Traicos, international cricketer of Greek origin
- Rushdy Abaza, actor
- Fekry Pasha Abaza, journalist and political activist
- Mohamed Abdelmonem, football Player

== See also ==
- List of cities and towns in Egypt
