= Safiya Zaghloul =

Egyptian activist and leader

Safiya Zaghloul صفية زغلول
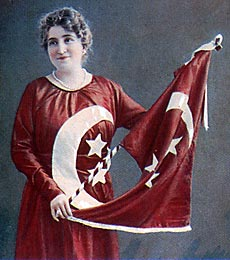
- Born: Safiya Fahmy; 1876; Cairo, Khedivate of Egypt
- Died: 12 January 1946 (aged 69–70)
- Spouse: Saad Zaghloul
- Parent: Mustafa Fahmi Pasha (father)

Safiya Zaghloul (Arabic: صفية زغلول / ALA-LC: Ṣafīyah Zaghlūl; née Fahmy; 1878–12 January 1946) was an Egyptian political activist. She was among the early leaders of the Wafd Party.

== Background ==
Zaghloul was born in 1878. She was of Turkish descent. Her father, Mostafa Fahmy Pasha, was the seventh prime minister of Egypt.

She married Saad Zaghloul in 1896, an Egyptian revolutionary and Prime Minister of Egypt from 26 January 1924 to 24 November 1924.

== Activities ==
After the exile of her husband Saad Zaghloul to Malta in 1919, she became a central figure of the Wafd Party, and her home a center for the party. She organized a demonstration of 500 women. After the death of her spouse in 1927, Zaghloul was central in the appointment of a new party leader. In fact, she was the leader of the Women's Wafd. She retired from political life after the party split of 1937.

She was known as Om El-Masriyyin ( Mother of the Egyptians) and her home in Cairo was called as Beit El-Umma (House of the Nation).

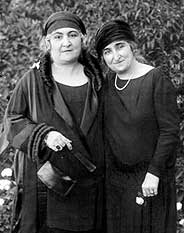
With Huda Shaarawi
