= Peter Mansfield (historian) =

British journalist (1928 - 1996)

Peter John Mansfield (2 September 1928 – 9 March 1996) was a British political journalist and historian.

Mansfield was born in Ranchi, India, in 1928, the son of an official in the Indian Civil Service. He was educated at Winchester College and Pembroke College, Cambridge, where he was elected President of the Cambridge Union.

In 1955, he was recruited by the Foreign Office, and was posted to Lebanon to study Arabic. He resigned his position in the aftermath of the Suez Crisis the following year. Remaining in Beirut, he edited the Middle East Forum and wrote regularly for the Financial Times, The Economist, The Guardian, the Indian Express and other newspapers. From 1961 to 1967, he was the Middle East correspondent of the Sunday Times.

His books as author or editor include The Middle East: A Political and Economic Survey, Habib Bourguiba of Tunisia Who's Who of the Arab World, Nasser's Egypt, Nasser: A Biography, The British in Egypt, Kuwait: Vanguard of the Gulf and The Arabs, and A History of the Middle East.

A fourth edition of his History of the Middle East, edited by Nicolas Pelham, was published in 2013. A subsequent fifth edition was published in 2019.

Mansfield died in Warwick in 1996. His obituary in The Times praised him as "eloquent, scholarly, free from convention...[He] earned himself a distinguished place by forty years of thoughtful work and the passion of his convictions."

== Works ==
- Mansfield, Peter (1969), Nasser's Egypt (Revised [i.e. 2nd] ed.), Penguin
- Mansfield, Peter (1971), The British in Egypt, Weidenfeld and Nicolson, ISBN 978-0-297-00453-0
- Mansfield, Peter (1973), The Ottoman Empire and its successors, Macmillan, ISBN 978-0-333-07382-7
- Mansfield, Peter (1976), The Arab world : a comprehensive history, Crowell, ISBN 978-0-690-01170-8
- Mansfield, Peter (1981), The new Arabians (1st ed.), J.G. Ferguson Pub. Co.; New York : Distributed by Doubleday, ISBN 978-0-385-17911-9
- Mansfield, Peter (1992), The Arabs (3rd ed.), Penguin, ISBN 978-0-14-014768-1
- Mansfield, Peter (1992), A history of the Middle East (New ed.), Penguin, ISBN 978-0-14-012538-2
