= Postal Museum (Cairo) =

Museum in Cairo, Egypt

Postal Museum of Egypt
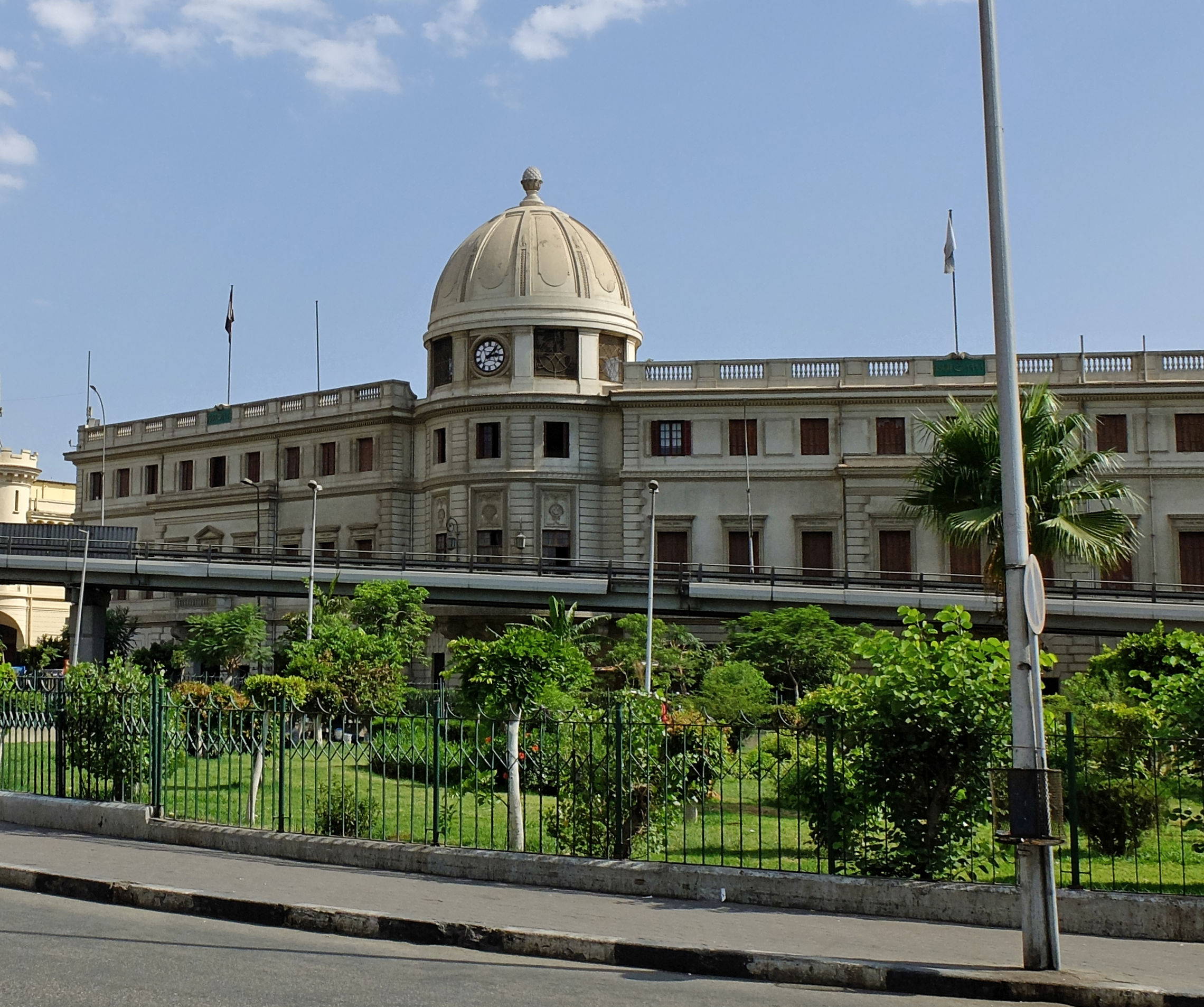
- Established: February 1934
- Location: Cairo, Egypt
- Coordinates: 30°03′00″N 31°14′57″E

The Postal Museum of Egypt in Cairo, Egypt, is dedicated to the history of Egypt's postal service. It is located on the second floor of the historic Central Post Office building, in Al-Ataba Square of Downtown Cairo.

== Historical background ==
The Central Post Office building was built during the Khedivate period, either in 1888 or in 1901. Following the trend of Egyptian architecture under Khedive Isma'il drawing heavily on the European tradition, the building was constructed in a neo-Baroque style. The museum inside it was founded by King Fuad I, who himself was an avid stamp collector and maintained an interest in postal affairs throughout his rule. The museum officially opened in February 1934, but only became accessible to the public following its 1940 inauguration under King Farouk.

In 2022, the Postal Museum reopened following major renovations as part of a development plan headed by the Egyptian National Postal Authority.

== Collection ==
The postal museum is spread across spread over 543 square metres (5,840 sq ft). The museum has displays of postal artifacts, pictures and documents showing different ways of delivering messages in Egypt over the centuries. Visitors can see Egyptian postage stamps issued by the Egyptian postal authority over the previous one hundred and fifty years, postal employee uniforms, postal equipment, models of post offices, miniature figurines of postal services over the centuries and a historical section.
