= Denshawai =

Village in Monufia Governorate, Egypt

Denshawai دنشواي
- Location in Egypt
- Coordinates: 30°36′01″N 30°51′05″E
- Country: Egypt
- Governorate: Monufia Governorate

Population (2006)
  - Total: 13,018
- Time zone: UTC+2 (EET)
  - Summer (DST): UTC+3 (EEST)

Denshawai (Arabic: دنشواي), former name Demshai (Arabic: دِمْشَيە, from Coptic: ϯⲙⲓ "village" and ϣⲁⲉⲓ "Shai") is a village in Egypt. It is one of villages of The seat of Martyrs and it is famous for the historical Denshawai Incident of 1906. In 2006, it had 13,018 inhabitants.

The 1885 Census of Egypt recorded Denshawai (as Denchawai) as a nahiyah under the district of Menouf in Monufia Governorate; at that time, the population of the town was 2,815 (1,363 men and 1,452 women).
