= Beit El-Umma =

Historic house museum in Cairo, Egypt

Coordinates: 30°02′15″N 31°14′16″E

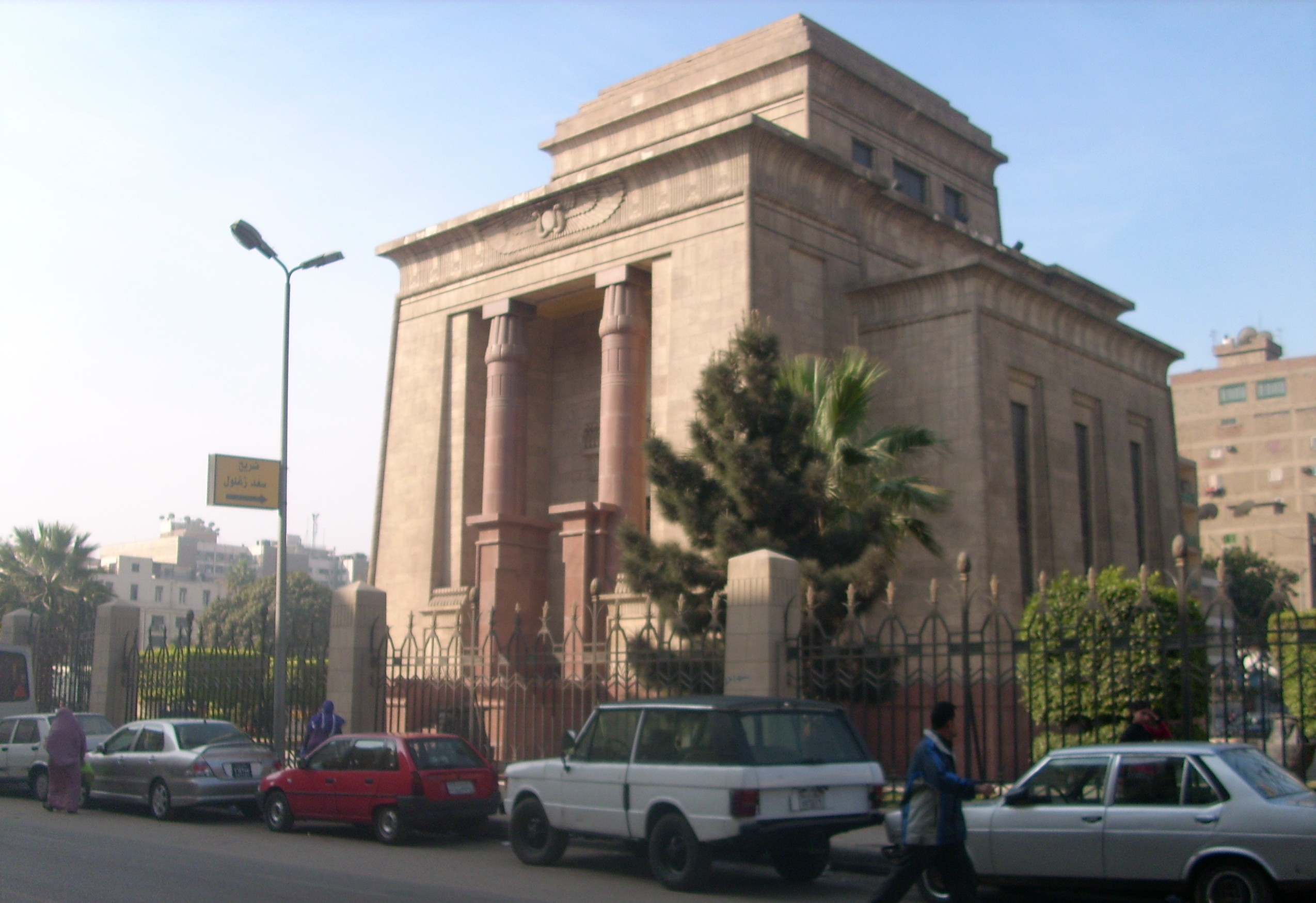
- Saad Zaghloul Cemetery & Museum - Bayt al-Umma - Munira - Cairo
- Location: Cairo, Egypt.
- Type: historic house museum and Saad Zaghlul biographical museum

Beit El-Umma or Bayt al-Umma (House of the People) is a historic house museum and Saad Zaghlul biographical museum in Cairo, Egypt.

== Saad Zaghlul ==
Beit El-Umma, or House of the People, was built at the turn of the century as a residence for the nationalist leader of modern Egypt and founder of the Wafd party, Saad Zaghlul (1857–1927). There is a bronze statue of Saad Zaghlul at the entrance to the museum.

== Beit El-Umma ==
Beit El-Umma has been carefully preserved in its original state as a museum, providing its visitors with a rare taste of the lifestyles of the Egyptian political elite at that time. It has an Art Nouveau dining room, Louis XV style reception rooms, an Arab style living room, Turkish baths and a fine library, which has over 5,000 books. Inside the house, several portraits and photographs of Saad Zaghloul and his wife Safiya Zaghloul are hung on the walls, as well as portraits for other members of the family, leaders and public speakers at the time.
