= Appia =

Appia may refer to:

== Places ==
- Appian Way (In Italian and Latin: Via Appia), one of the earliest and strategically most important Roman roads of the ancient republic
- Appia (Phrygia), a town and bishopric of ancient Phrygia, now in Turkey
- Aqua Appia, the first ancient Roman aqueduct, constructed in 312 BC

== People ==
- Appia gens, family at ancient Rome
- Adolphe Appia (1862–1928), Swiss architect and theorist of stage lighting and décor
- Dominique Appia (1926–2017), Swiss painter who lived and worked in the city of Geneva
- Louis Appia (1818–1898), surgeon with special merit in military medicine
- Saint Appia (1st century AD), wife of Philemon, recipient of a letter from Paul the Apostle

== Nature ==
- Appia (skipper), genus of skipper butterflies in the family Hesperiidae

== Other uses ==
- Appia (software), free and open-source layered communication toolkit implemented in Java
- Lancia Appia, car introduced in 1953 as a replacement for the Ardea, produced for 10 years

== See also ==
- Appian (disambiguation)
- Appiah, Ghanaian surname
- Appias (genus), genus of butterflies
- Appias, naiad and one of the Crinaeae
