= Apian =

Apian or Apianus may refer to:

== People ==
- Apian or Aphian, Catholic and Eastern Orthodox saint
- Peter Apian or Petrus Apianus, as well as Peter Bienewitz or Bennewitz, (1495-1552), German humanist
- Philipp Apian, also Philipp Apianus, (1531-1589), German mathematician, physician and cartographer (son of Peter, brother of Timotheus Apian)
- Paul Otto Apian-Bennewitz, (1847-1892), organist and teacher, founder of the Museum of Musical Instruments in Markneukirchen

== Other ==
- Apian-Gymnasium Ingolstadt, secondary school in Ingolstadt, Germany, named after Peter and Philipp Apian
- 19139 Apian, asteroid named after Peter Apian
- Apianus (crater), (26° 9' S and 7° 9' E) on the Moon named after Peter Apian

== See also ==
- Apidae or apids, the bees
- Appian (disambiguation)
