= Ismailia =

City in Egypt

Ismailia الإسماعيلية
- City
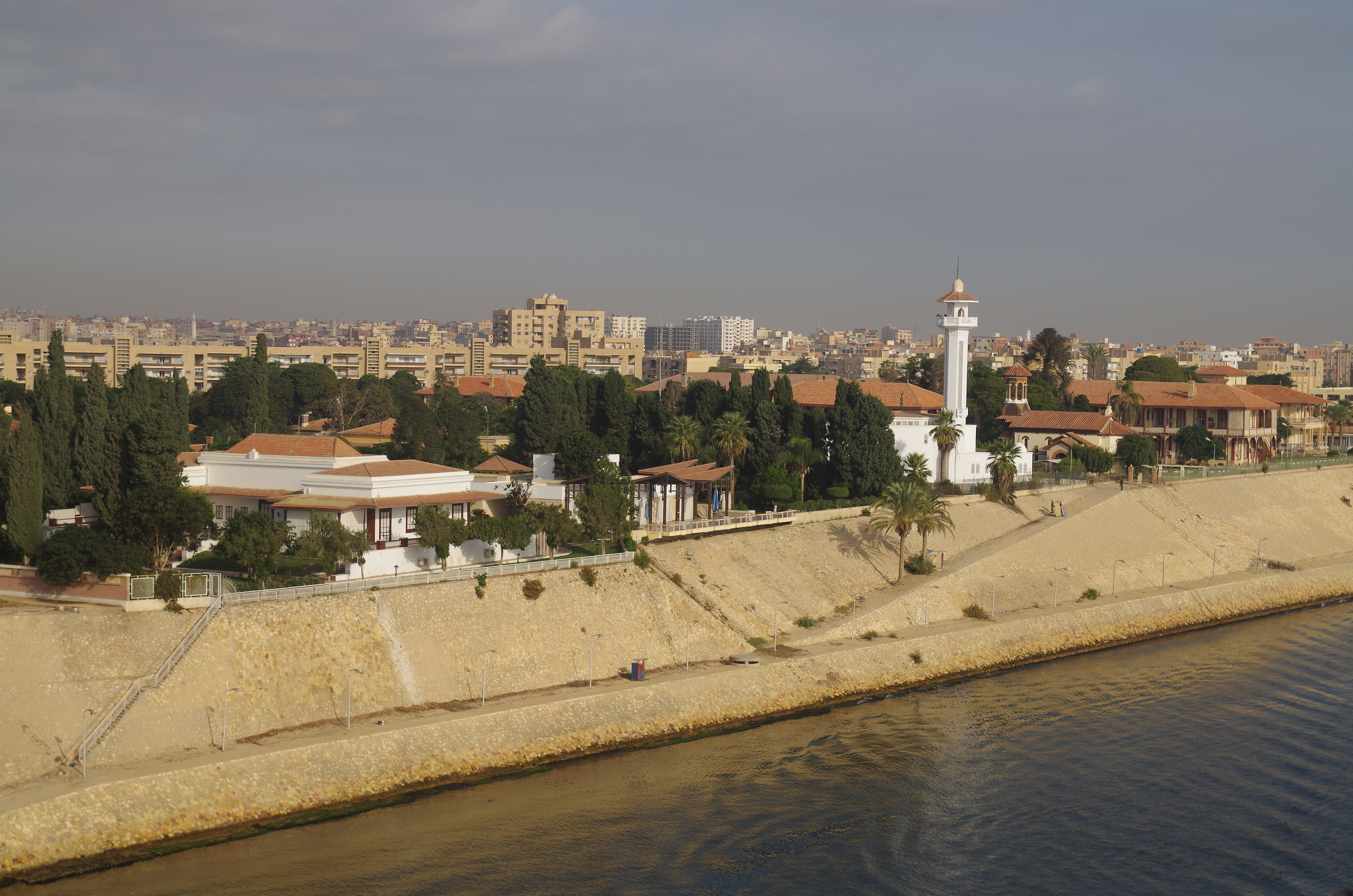
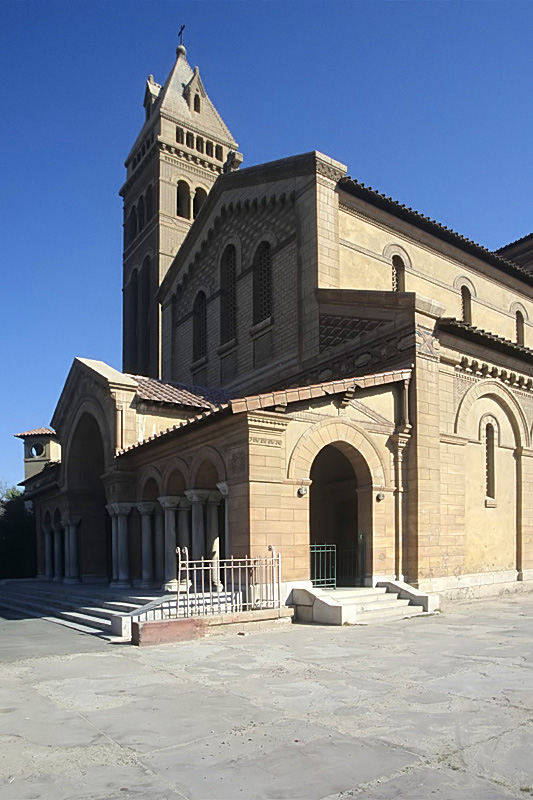
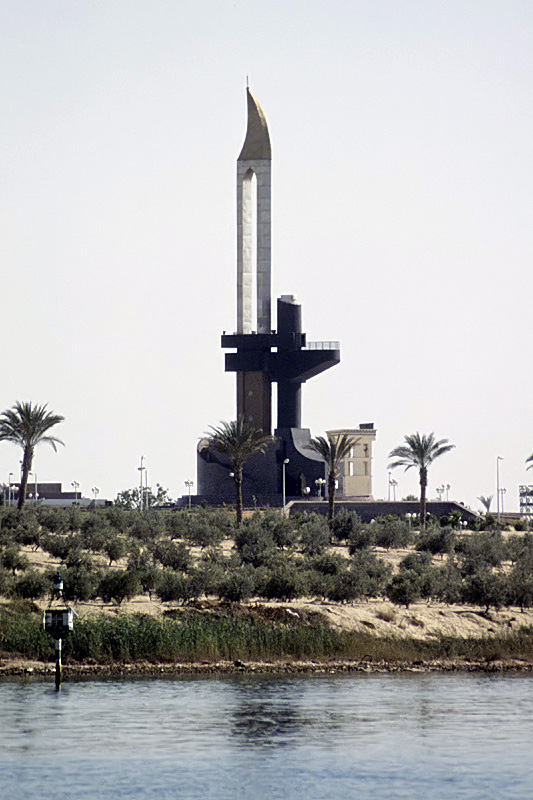
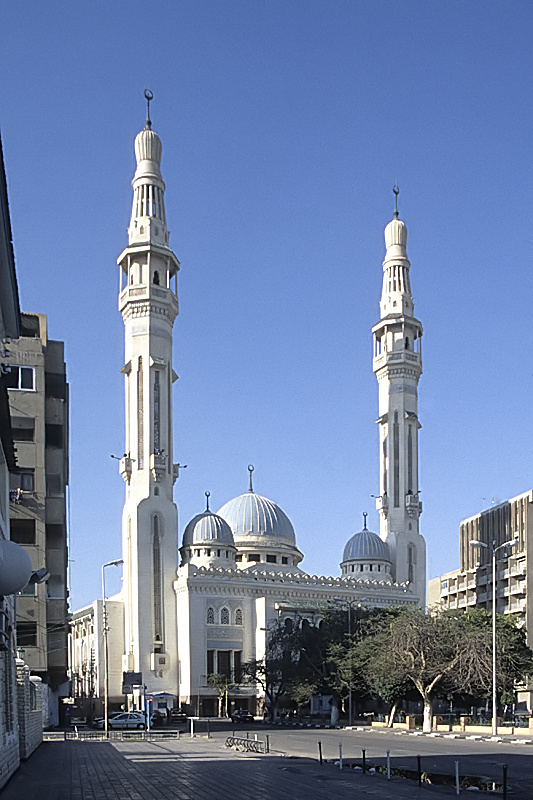
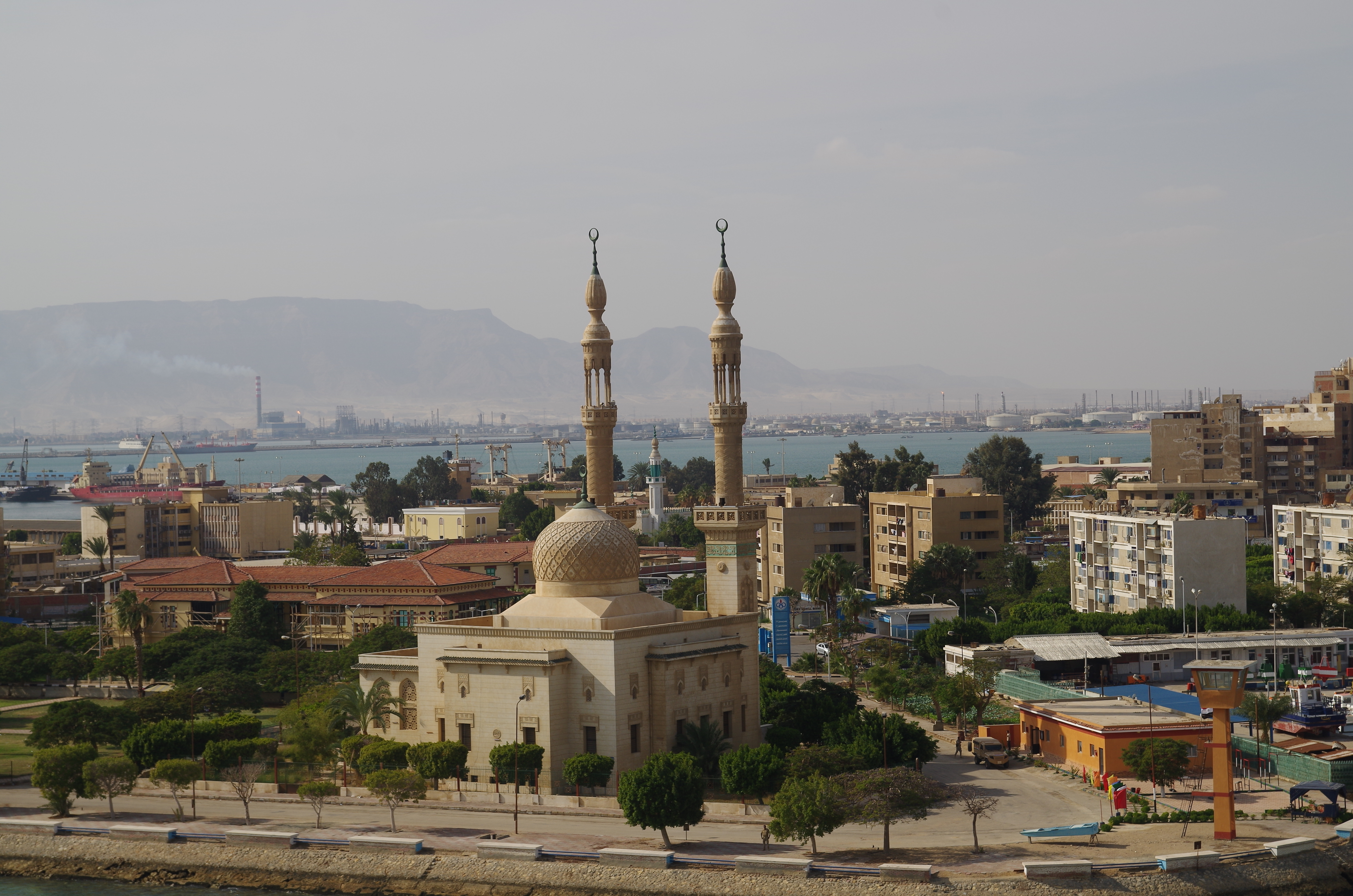
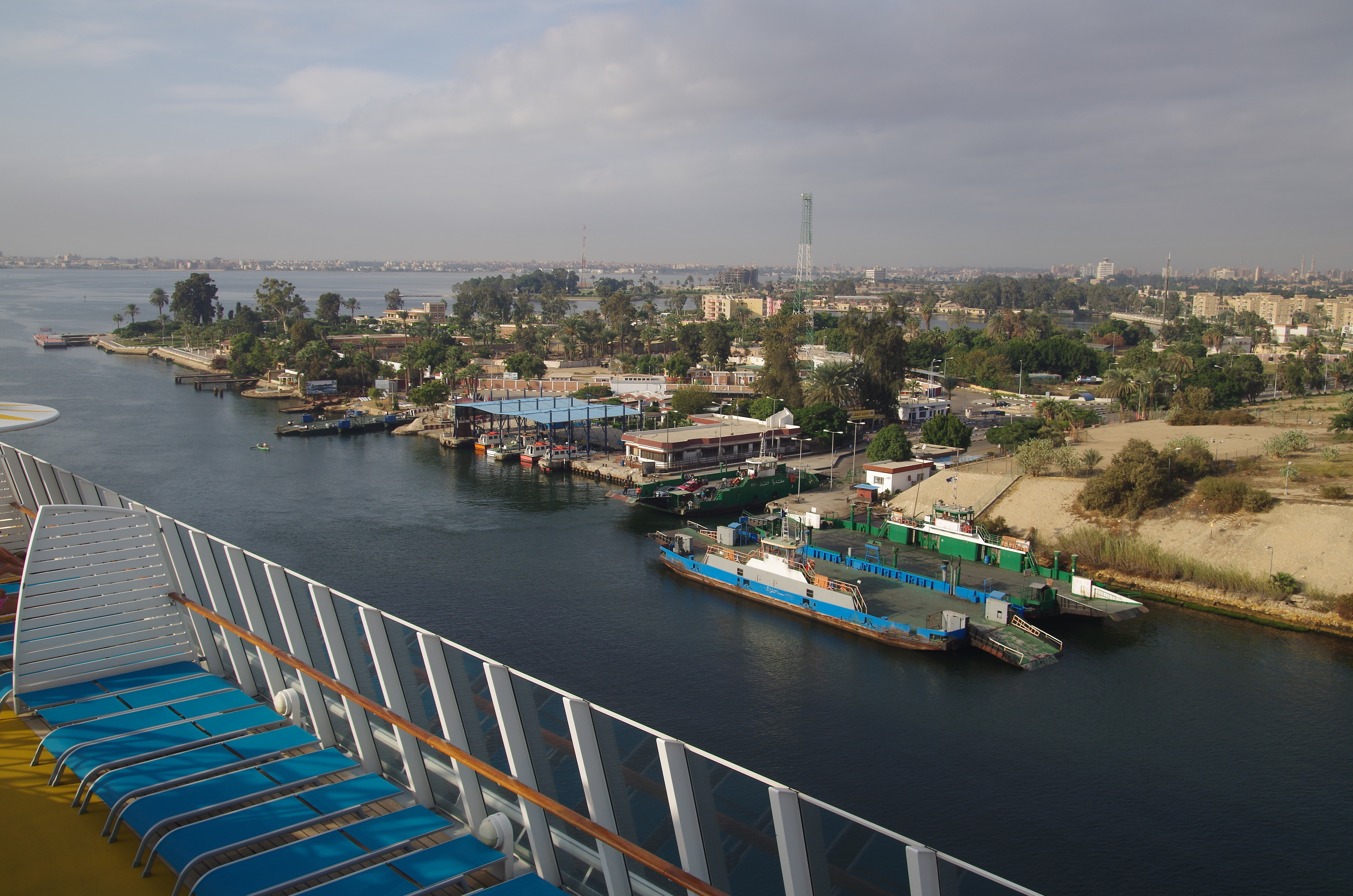
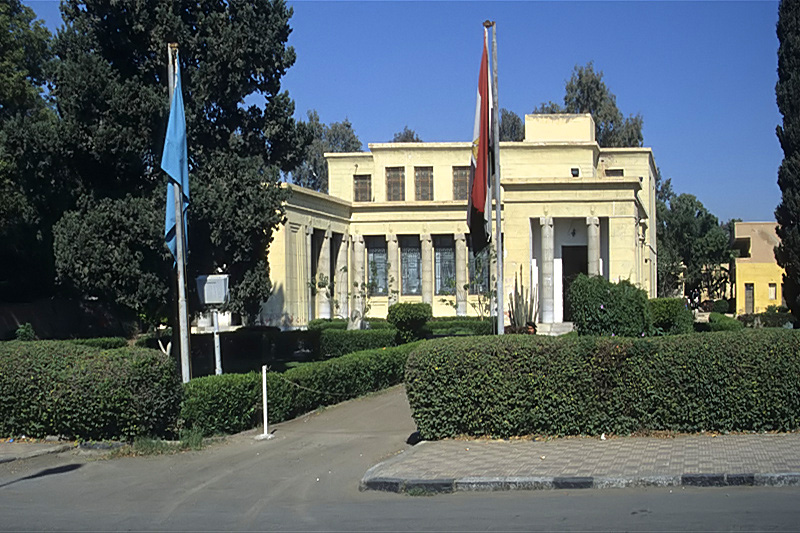
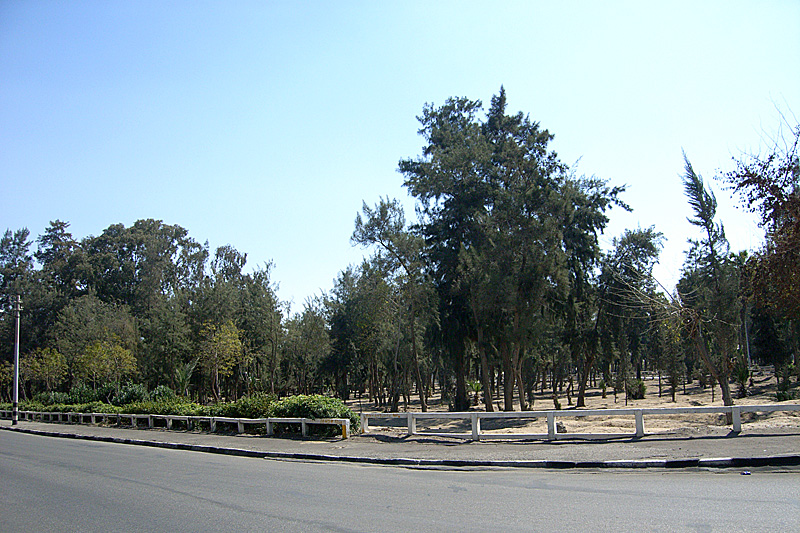
- View of the Waterfront Church of St. Mark Battle of Ismailia Memorial Mosque of Abu Bakr el-Sadiq View from Suez Canal City shores Ismailia Archaeological museum Mallaha Park

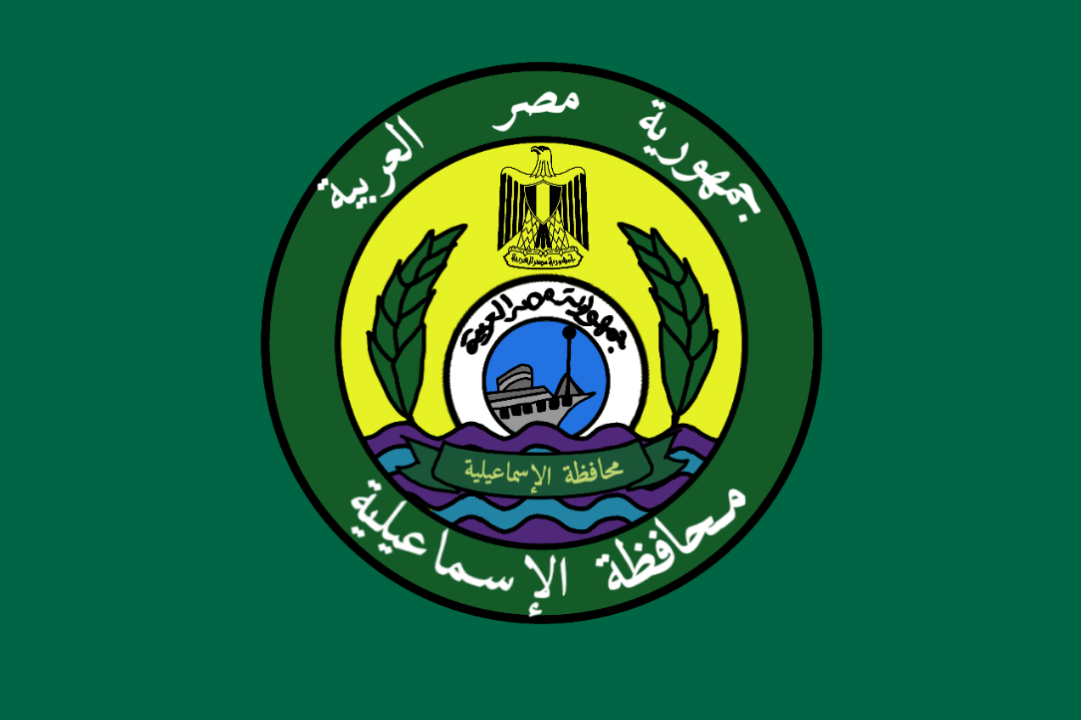
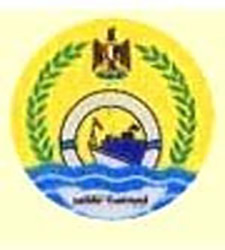
- Flag Seal

- Location in Egypt Ismailia (Africa)
- Coordinates: 30°35′N 32°16′E
- Country: Egypt
- Governorate: Ismailia
- Established: 1863

Area
  - Total: 68.8 km^{2} (26.6 sq mi)
- Elevation: 14 m (46 ft)

Population (2024)
  - Total: 380,000
  - Density: 5,500/km^{2} (14,000/sq mi)
- Demonym(s): Ismaili (Male, Arabic: إسماعيلي) Ismailia (Female, Arabic: إسماعيلية)

GDP (nominal, constant 2015 values)
  - Year: 2024
  - Total (Urban): $2.3 billion
  - Per capita: $6,053
- Time zone: UTC+2 (EET)
  - Summer (DST): UTC+3 (EEST)
- Area code: (+20) 69 or (+20) 64

Ismailia (Egyptian Arabic: الإسماعيلية el-Ismāʻīlīyah, Egyptian Arabic: [lesmæʕiˈlejjæ]) is a city in north-eastern Egypt. The city is located near the midpoint of the Suez Canal, on the Northwestern shore of Lake Al-Timsah. It is the capital of the Ismailia Governorate. It is located approximately halfway between Port Said to the north and Suez to the south. The Canal widens at that point to include Lake Timsah, one of the Bitter Lakes linked by the Canal. Ismailia had an estimated population of 380,000 in 2024.

== History ==
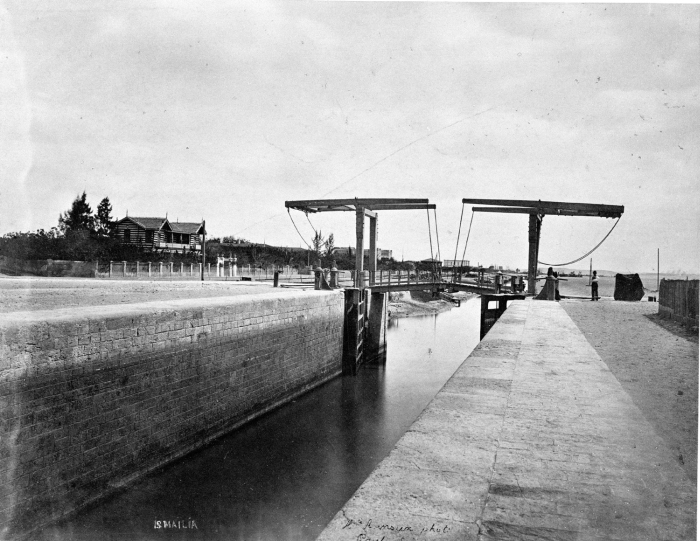
Ismaïlia, ca. 1870

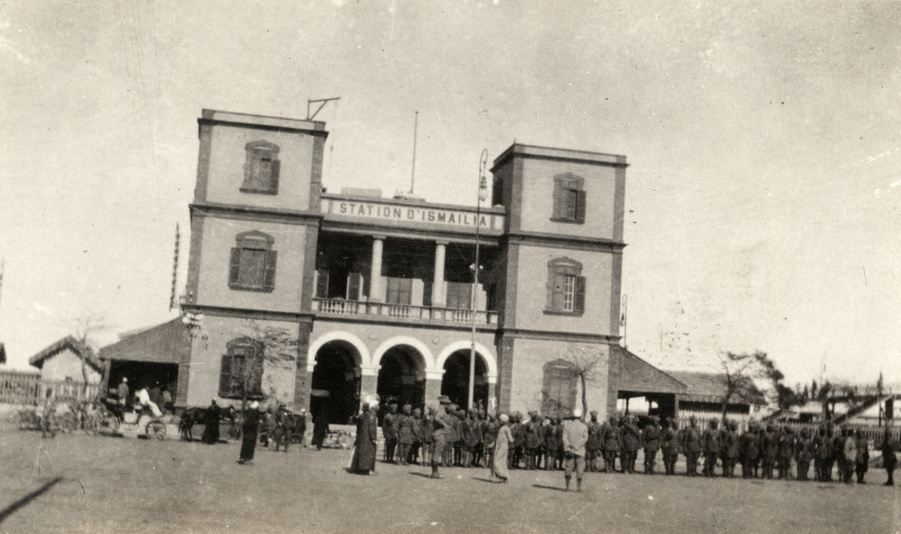
Indian troops lined up in front of Ismalia Railway Station, 1915.

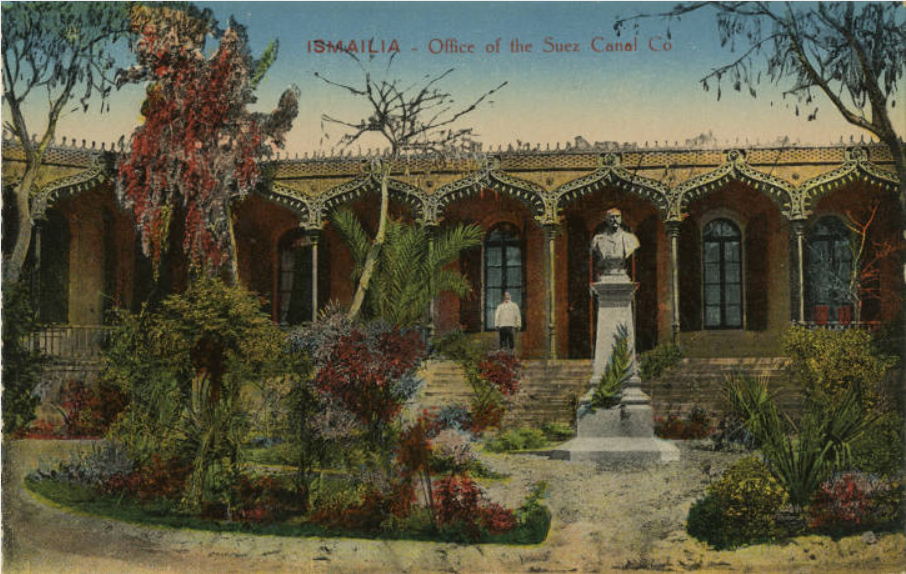
Postcard of the Suez Canal Company

Ismailia was founded in 1863, during the construction of the Suez Canal, by Khedive Ismail, after whom the city is named. Following the Battle of Kafr-el-Dawwar in 1882 the British established a base there.

The head office of the Suez Canal Authority is located in Ismailia at the shore of Lake Timsah. It has a large number of buildings dating from British and French involvement with the Canal. Most of these buildings are currently used by Canal employees and officials.

During World War I the British had an air base there and the Battle of Romani took place nearby. Ismailia War Cemetery was designed in 1919 by Sir Robert Lorimer marking the casualties of the battle.

In 1973, the Battle of Ismailia took place in the city between the Egyptian Armed Forces and the Israel Defense Forces. The battle resulted in the Egyptians successfully defending the city from the Israelis.

In October 2023, a massive fire broke out in the security directorate of the city, leaving the building fully burned with 38 injured and 1 dead.

=== Government and politics ===
The Muslim Brotherhood was founded in Ismailia by Hassan al-Banna in March 1928. An underground paramilitary wing was established in the 1940s, primarily to contest the British occupation of Egypt. In the early 1950s, Ismailia hosted the British Military HQ and the Civilian Administration Centre of the Canal Zone. An attack on an Egyptian government building and army barracks manned by auxiliary policemen by a British Army force on 25 January 1952 was a key event leading to the overthrow of King Farouk I later that year and the Egyptian Revolution that followed. British forces pulled out of Ismailia in 1954.

== Climate ==
Köppen-Geiger climate classification system classifies its climate as hot desert (BWh).

The hottest recorded temperature was 47 °C (117 °F) on 14 June 1944 while the coldest recorded temperature was 0.2 °C (32.4 °F) in January. During the transitional months notably the spring, the city may be affected by the khamsin wind, subsequently raising temperatures significantly and up 40 °C (104 °F) in some cases.

Climate data for Ismailia 1991–2020 normals, extremes 1950–present
Month	Jan	Feb	Mar	Apr	May	Jun	Jul	Aug	Sep	Oct	Nov	Dec	Year
Record high °C (°F)	29.5 (85.1)	33.6 (92.5)	39.2 (102.6)	41.5 (106.7)	46.2 (115.2)	46.2 (115.2)	46.5 (115.7)	45.4 (113.7)	44.0 (111.2)	41.1 (106.0)	36.5 (97.7)	32.0 (89.6)	46.5 (115.7)
Mean daily maximum °C (°F)	19.2 (66.6)	20.5 (68.9)	23.4 (74.1)	28.5 (83.3)	32.8 (91.0)	35.5 (95.9)	36.6 (97.9)	36.4 (97.5)	34.5 (94.1)	31.0 (87.8)	25.8 (78.4)	21.0 (69.8)	28.8 (83.8)
Daily mean °C (°F)	13.8 (56.8)	14.8 (58.6)	17.4 (63.3)	21.7 (71.1)	25.8 (78.4)	28.6 (83.5)	30.1 (86.2)	30.2 (86.4)	28.4 (83.1)	25.1 (77.2)	20.0 (68.0)	15.6 (60.1)	22.6 (72.7)
Mean daily minimum °C (°F)	8.3 (46.9)	9.0 (48.2)	11.3 (52.3)	14.8 (58.6)	18.8 (65.8)	21.7 (71.1)	23.5 (74.3)	23.9 (75.0)	22.2 (72.0)	19.2 (66.6)	14.3 (57.7)	10.1 (50.2)	16.4 (61.5)
Record low °C (°F)	0.2 (32.4)	2.0 (35.6)	3.8 (38.8)	6.4 (43.5)	9.5 (49.1)	13.4 (56.1)	16.0 (60.8)	17.5 (63.5)	13.0 (55.4)	10.5 (50.9)	5.2 (41.4)	2.0 (35.6)	0.2 (32.4)
Average precipitation mm (inches)	6.8 (0.27)	5.2 (0.20)	4.8 (0.19)	2.5 (0.10)	1.8 (0.07)	0 (0)	0 (0)	0 (0)	0.2 (0.01)	2.4 (0.09)	5.1 (0.20)	6.2 (0.24)	35.0 (1.38)
Average precipitation days (≥ 1.0 mm)	2.4	2.0	1.8	0.9	0.5	0.0	0.0	0.0	0.1	0.8	1.5	2.1	12.1
Average relative humidity (%)	64.0	60.5	57.0	50.5	48.0	50.0	54.5	57.0	58.0	60.5	64	66.0	57.5
Average dew point °C (°F)	7.1 (44.8)	7.1 (44.8)	8.7 (47.7)	11.1 (52.0)	14.1 (57.4)	17.4 (63.3)	19.9 (67.8)	20.8 (69.4)	19.3 (66.7)	16.8 (62.2)	12.9 (55.2)	9.4 (48.9)	13.7 (56.7)
Source 1: NOAA
Source 2: Egyptian Meteorological Authority Climate Data; World Meteorological Organization

== Culture ==
=== Arts and festivals ===
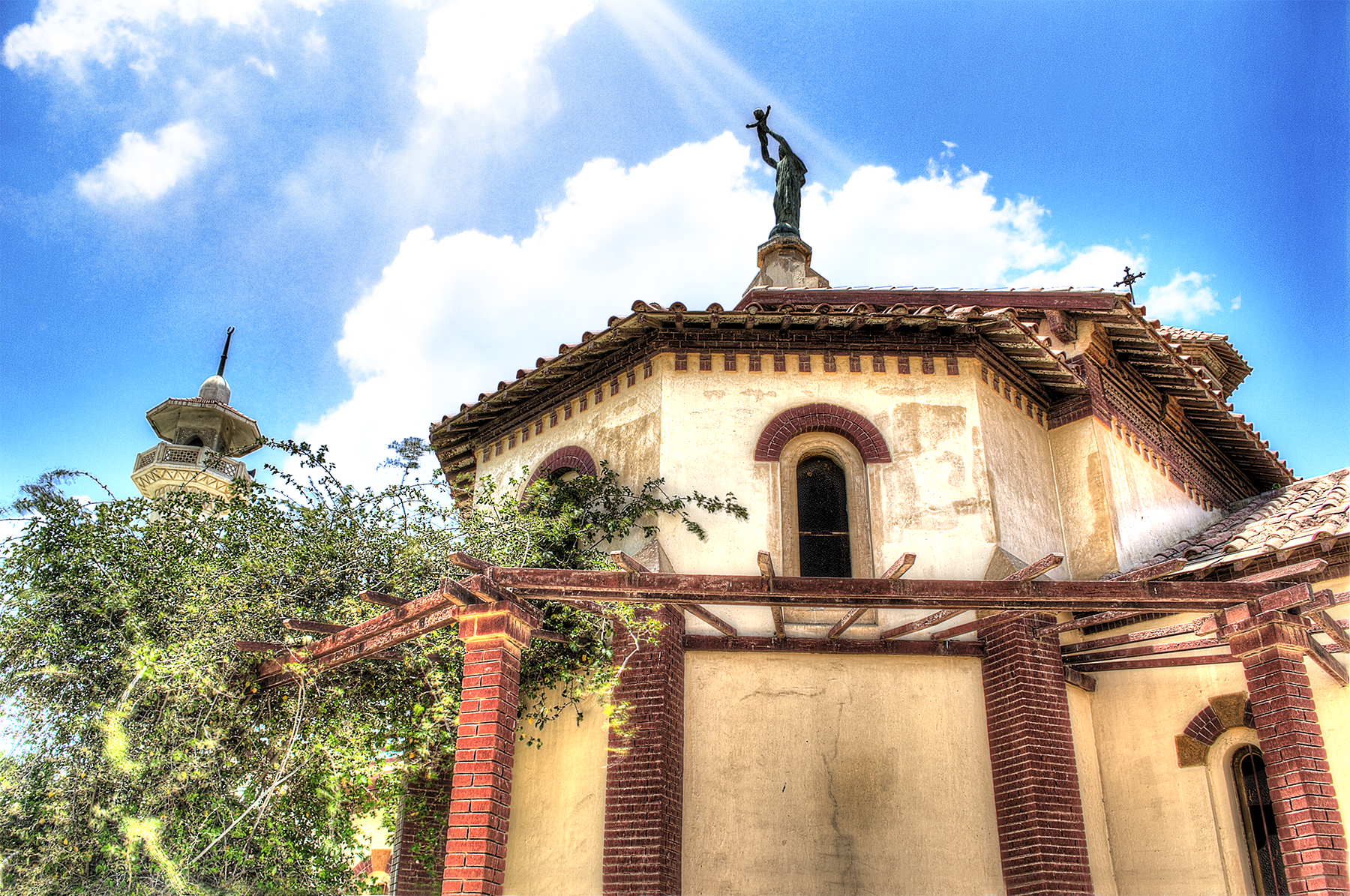
Virgin Mary Church known as "Guardian of the Canal", is one of many examples of French architecture in Ismailia

Ismailia hosts two important festivals each year. The first is the International Film Festival for Documentaries and Shorts that is held in June. In June 2014, the 17th consecutive festival was organized. The second is the Ismailia International Folklore Arts Festival that is held in September. In this festival folkloric troupes from all around the globe meet in Ismailia, where they perform folkloric dances representing the culture of their countries.

=== Eparchy ===
On 17 December 1982 an Eparchy (Eastern Catholic Diocese) of Ismayliah was established on territory split off from the Coptic Catholic Patriarchate of Alexandria (Alexandrian Rite in Coptic language), which remains its Metropolitan. Its episcopal see is St. Mark's cathedral.

Suffragan Eparchs (Bishops of Ismayliah)

- Athanasios Abadir (17 December 1982 – 25 December 1992, his death), previously Titular Bishop of Appia and Patriarchal Vicar of Alexandria of the Copts (Egypt) (18 May 1976 – 17 December 1982)
- Youhannes Ezzat Zakaria Badir (23 November 1992 – 23 June 1994), later Eparch (Bishop) of Luqsor of the Copts (Egypt) (23 June 1994 – 27 December 2015, his death)
- Makarios Tewfik (23 June 1994 – 29 June 2019, resigned)
- Daniel Lotfy Khella (29 June 2019 – 23 September 2022) (Patriarchal administrator 23 September 2022 – 31 March 2023)
- Pola Ayoub Matta Usama Shafik Akhnoukh (31 March 2023 – Present)

=== Sports ===
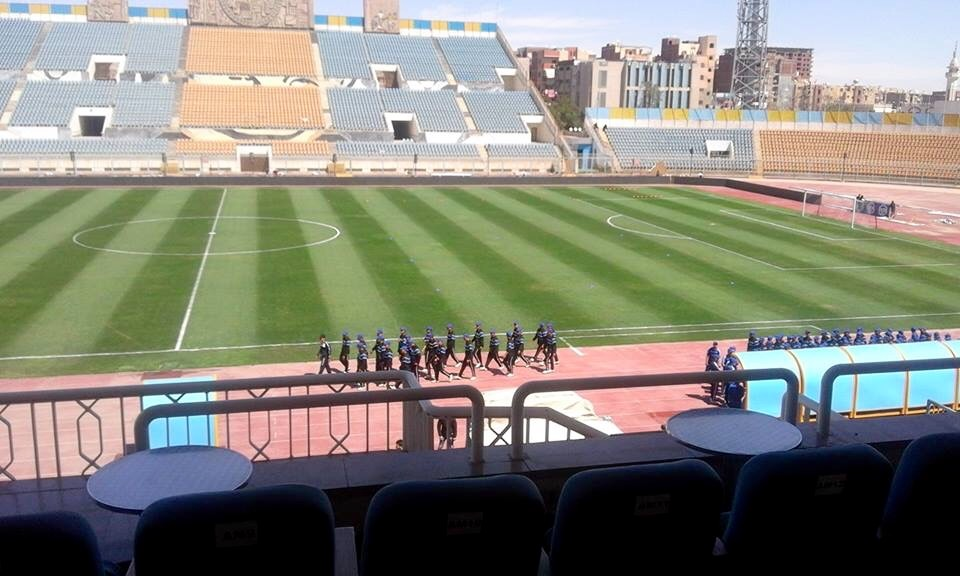
Ismailia Stadium

Ismailia is home to the third most successful club in Egypt (in the field of Football, Ismaily SC. The club's performance is considered a major political issue, and can tend to dictate the city's mood. The team enjoys brief stints of competition for local and international competition, but its financial situation prevents these stints from extending beyond a few years. The team has won the Egyptian League three times (1967, 1991, 2002), the Egyptian Cup twice (1997, 2000), and the African Cup of Champions Clubs once in 1969 as the first Egyptian and Arab Club team to have won this league.

== Tourism ==
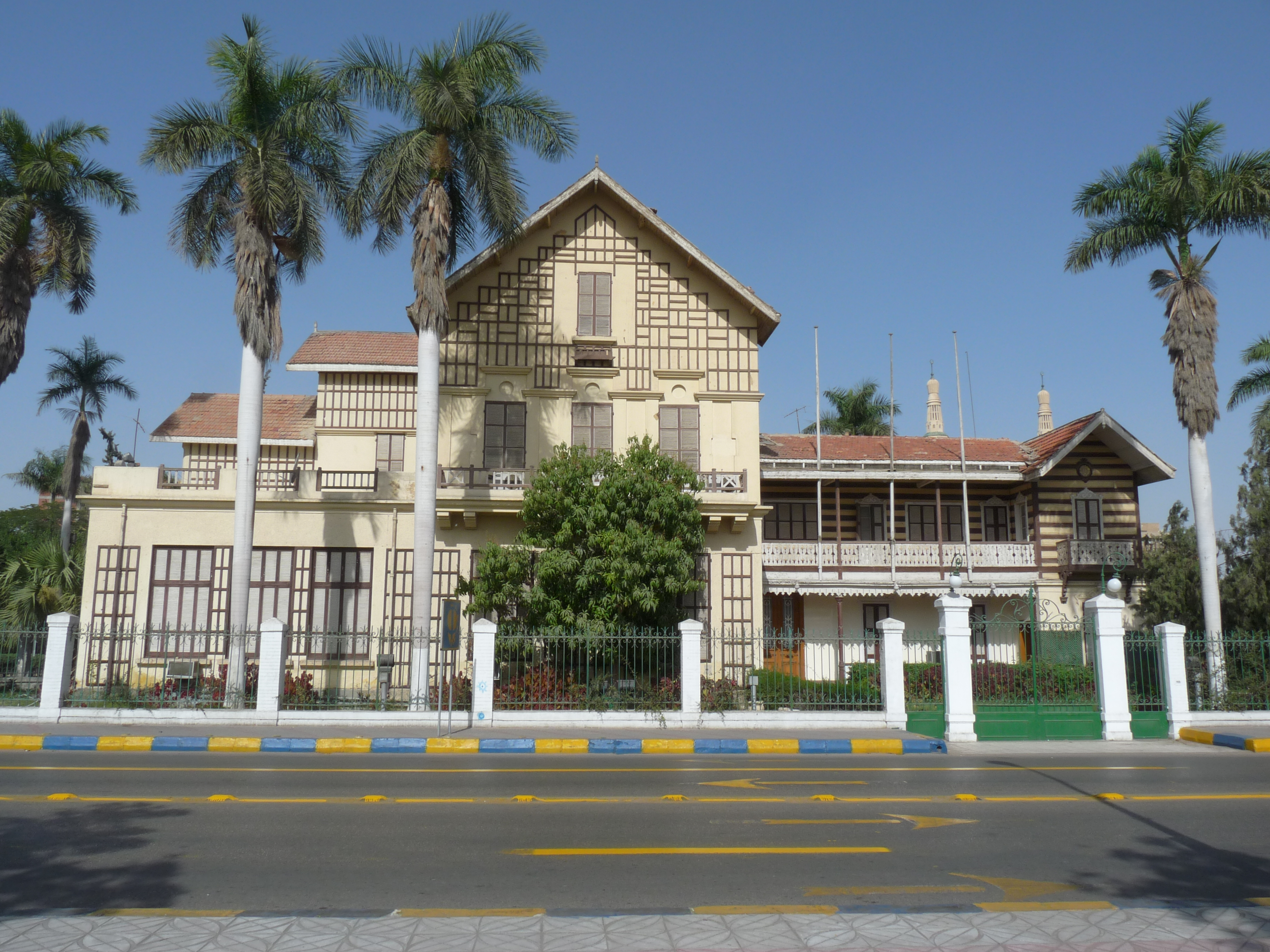
Ferdinand de Lesseps' house and office in Ismailia, near the Suez Canal

Ismailia does get tourists from within Egypt, but is not a major tourism destination for international tourists. The city is approximately a ninety-minute automobile drive from Cairo. From Ismailia it is approximately a four-hour drive to Sharm el-Sheikh in South Sinai. Driving to the Taba Border Crossing at Taba and the Rafah Border Crossing at Rafah are both approximately four-hour drives. A major attraction is the Ismailia Museum which was built in 1932. Visitors will find a variety of significant archaeological finds especially from sites in the Ismailia governorate such as Tell el-Maskhuta, from North Sinai, and from Upper Egypt.

== Education ==
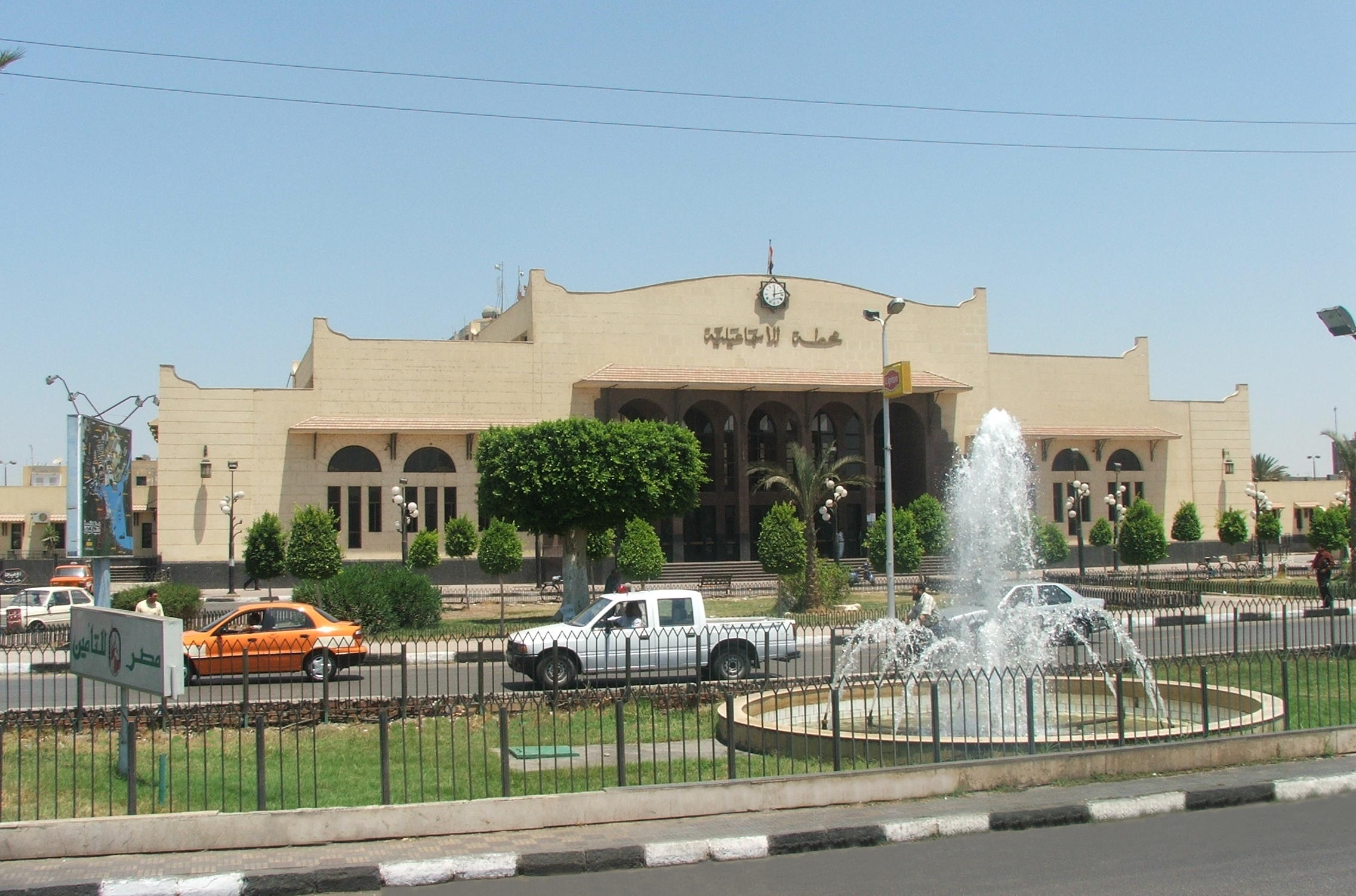
Ismailia railway station

Ismailia has several public and private schools. Ismailia is the home of the Suez Canal University, established in 1976 with the help of the Chinese Government to serve the region of Suez Canal and Sinai. Suez Canal University now is one of the fastest growing educational institutions in Egypt with many students studying abroad.

== Notable people ==
- Hassan al-Banna, founder of the Muslim Brotherhood, worked as a teacher in Ismailia
- Louis Chedid, French singer and songwriter, son of writer Andrée Chedid and father of Matthieu Chedid, was born in Ismailia on 1 January 1948
- Mohamed Diab, Egyptian director
- Claude François, French pop singer and songwriter, born in Ismailia on 1 February 1939
- Ali Gabr, footballer
- Ragaa Al Geddawy (1934–2020), film actress, model and niece of Taheyya Kariokka
- Ahmed Hegazy, footballer
- Aura Herzog, First Lady of Israel, wife of former Israeli President Chaim Herzog and mother of current Israeli President Isaac Herzog born in Ismailia on 24 December 1924.
- Taheyya Kariokka, Egyptian belly dancer and film actress, born in Ismailia on 22 February 1919
- Yasmine Khlat, Lebanese actress
- Fernand Legros (1931-1983), Art dealer
- Osman Ahmed Osman, Egyptian engineer, contractor, entrepreneur and politician, born in Ismailia on 6 April 1917
- Omar Moawad, footballer

== See also ==
- List of cities and towns in Egypt

== Sources ==
- Falling Rain Genomics, Inc. "Geographical information on Al Ismailiyah, Egypt". Archived from the original on 27 September 2008.
