= Appian (disambiguation) =

Appian (Αππιανός) was a Roman historian.

Appian may also refer to:

== Places ==
- Appian Way (Via Appia), an important ancient Roman road, constructed by Appius Claudius Caecus
- Appian Way, Burwood, Sydney, street in the suburb of Burwood in Sydney, New South Wales, Australia
- Appian Way Regional Park, protected area of around 3400 hectares, established by the Italian region of Latium

== Organizations ==
- Appian Graphics, supplier of multi-monitor graphics accelerators
- Appian Publications & Recordings, British company specialising in the restoration and re-issue of early recordings of classical music
- Appian Technology, previously called ZyMOS Corporation, a semiconductor manufacturing company in Sunnyvale, California
- Appian Way Productions, film production company in West Hollywood, California, established by actor and producer Leonardo DiCaprio
- Appian Corporation, a cloud-computing company based in Virginia

== People ==
- Adolphe Appian (born 1819), French landscape painter and etcher
- Saint Appian, 4th-century martyr

== See also ==
- Appia (disambiguation)
- Apian (disambiguation)
