= Adolphe Appian =

French painter (1819–1898)

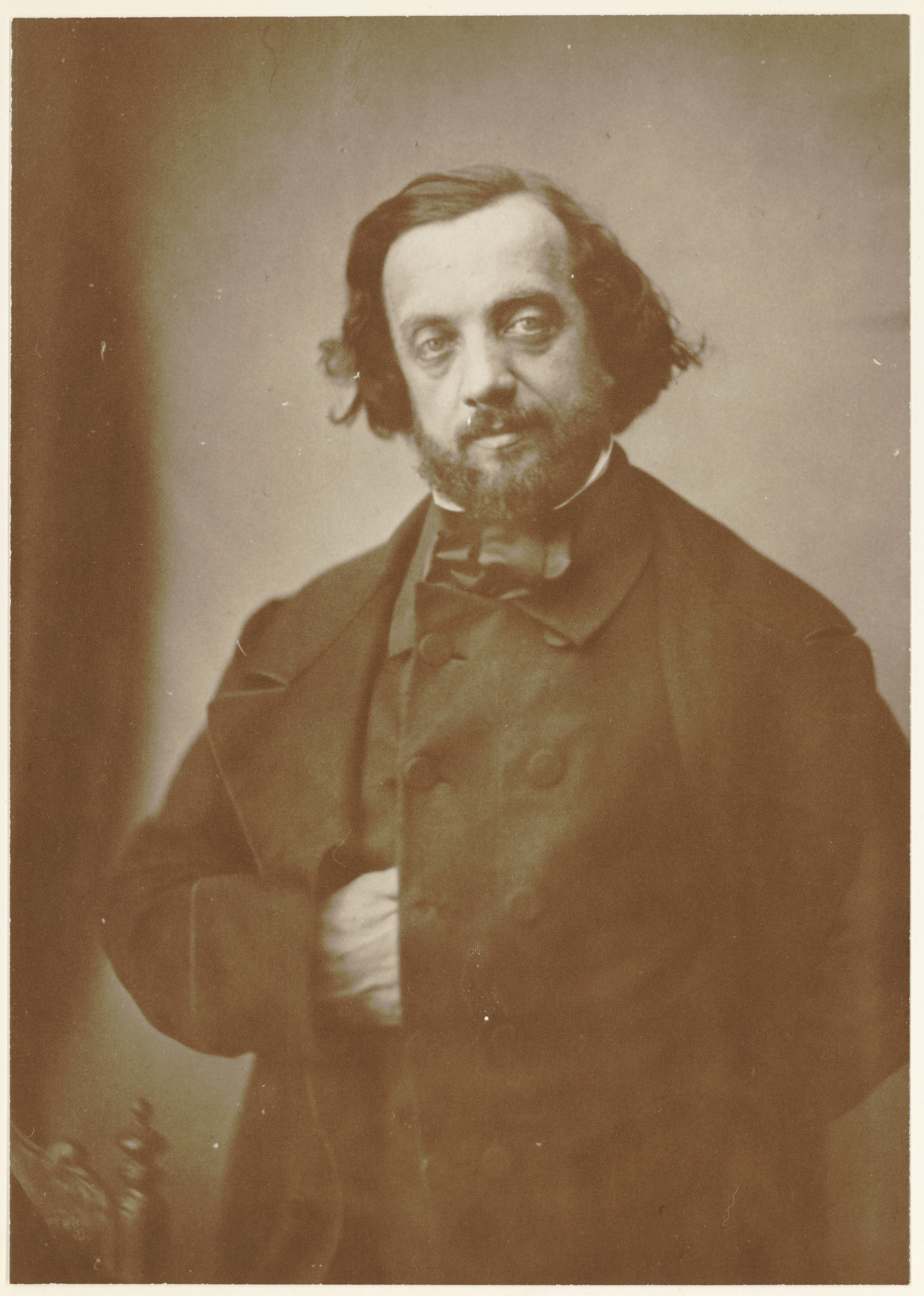
- Adolphe Appian (photo by Camille Dolard)
- Born: Jacques Barthelemy Adolphe Appian; 28 August 1819; Lyon, France
- Died: 29 April 1898 (aged 78); Lyon, France
- Known for: Painting, Etching
- Movement: Barbizon school
- influenced by: Camille Corot, Charles-François Daubigny
- influenced: Stephen Parrish

Adolphe Appian (born as Jacques Barthelemy Adolphe Appian; 28 August 1819 – 29 April 1898) was a French landscape painter and etcher.

== Early life ==
Appian was born in Lyon and changed his name to Adolphe Appian at age fifteen. At the age of fifteen Appian attended the Ecole des Beaux-Arts at Lyon which was an art school which specialized in training to decorate fabrics by a local silk industry. He studied under Jean-Michel Grobon and Augustin Alexandre Thierrat. Later he opened a studio in Lyon and worked as a graphic designer. He travelled to Paris to finish his studies and after he had exhibited a painting and a charcoal drawing in the Salon of 1853 he became friends with Camille Corot and Charles-François Daubigny who greatly influenced his style. Appian was elected a Chevalier of the Legion of Honour.

== Works ==
In 1866, Appian's two works that he exhibited in Paris were bought by Napoleon III and by princess Mathilde. He painted at the beginning of his career atmospheric pictures in a monochromatic palette of the riverside of the Rhone and the south of France. In 1870 he changed his style to use brilliant and striking color in his paintings but he still continued to make charcoal drawings as well as small etchings of landscapes in the Barbizon style.

As an etcher, he had a distinct influence on the American artist, Stephen Parrish.

Appian died in Lyon on 29 April 1898.

== Gallery ==
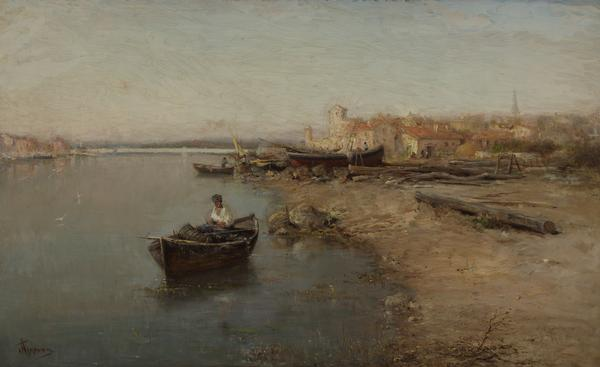
Le Soir aux Martiguese, 1850

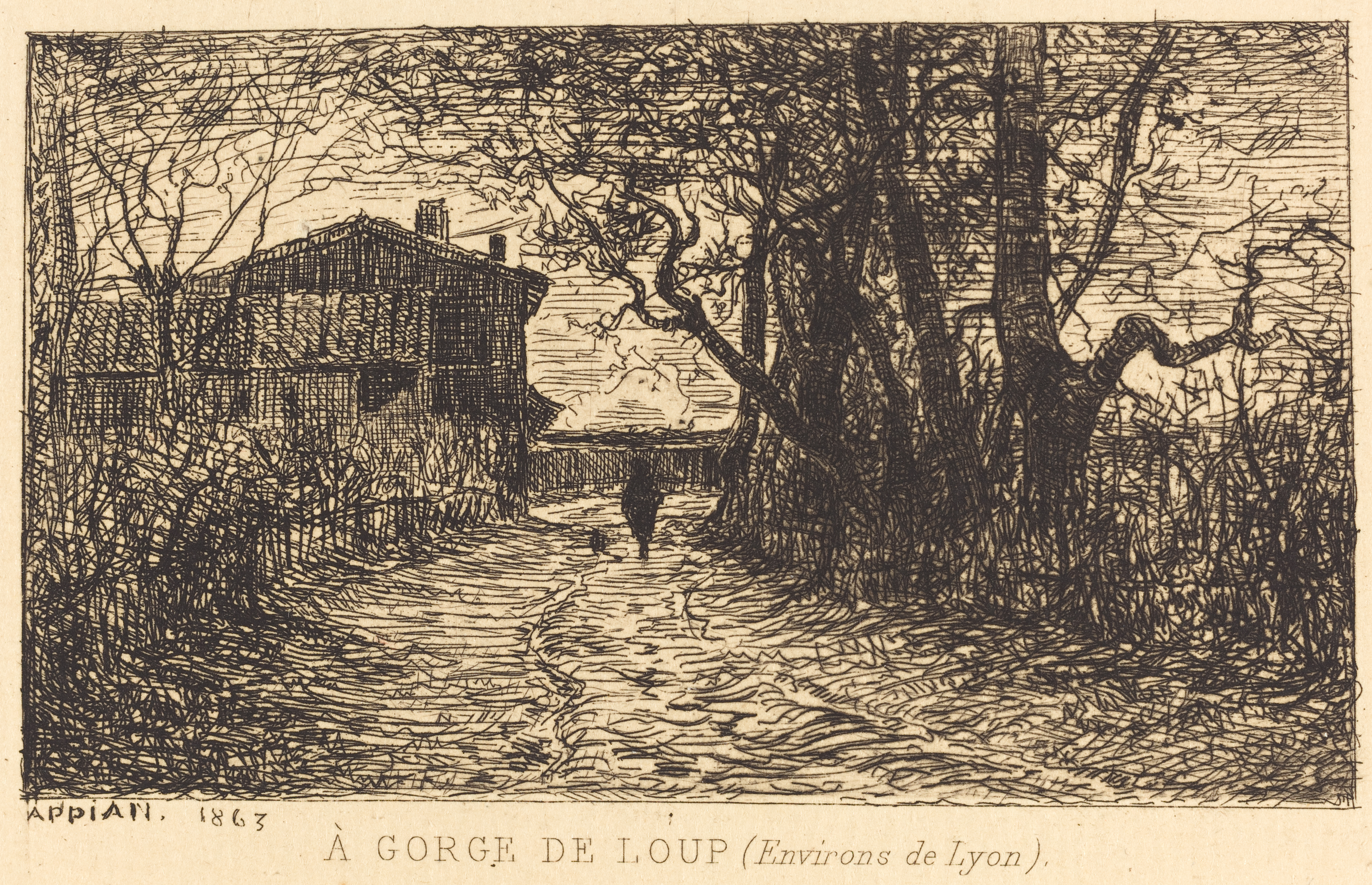
A Gorge de Loup, 1863, National Gallery of Art

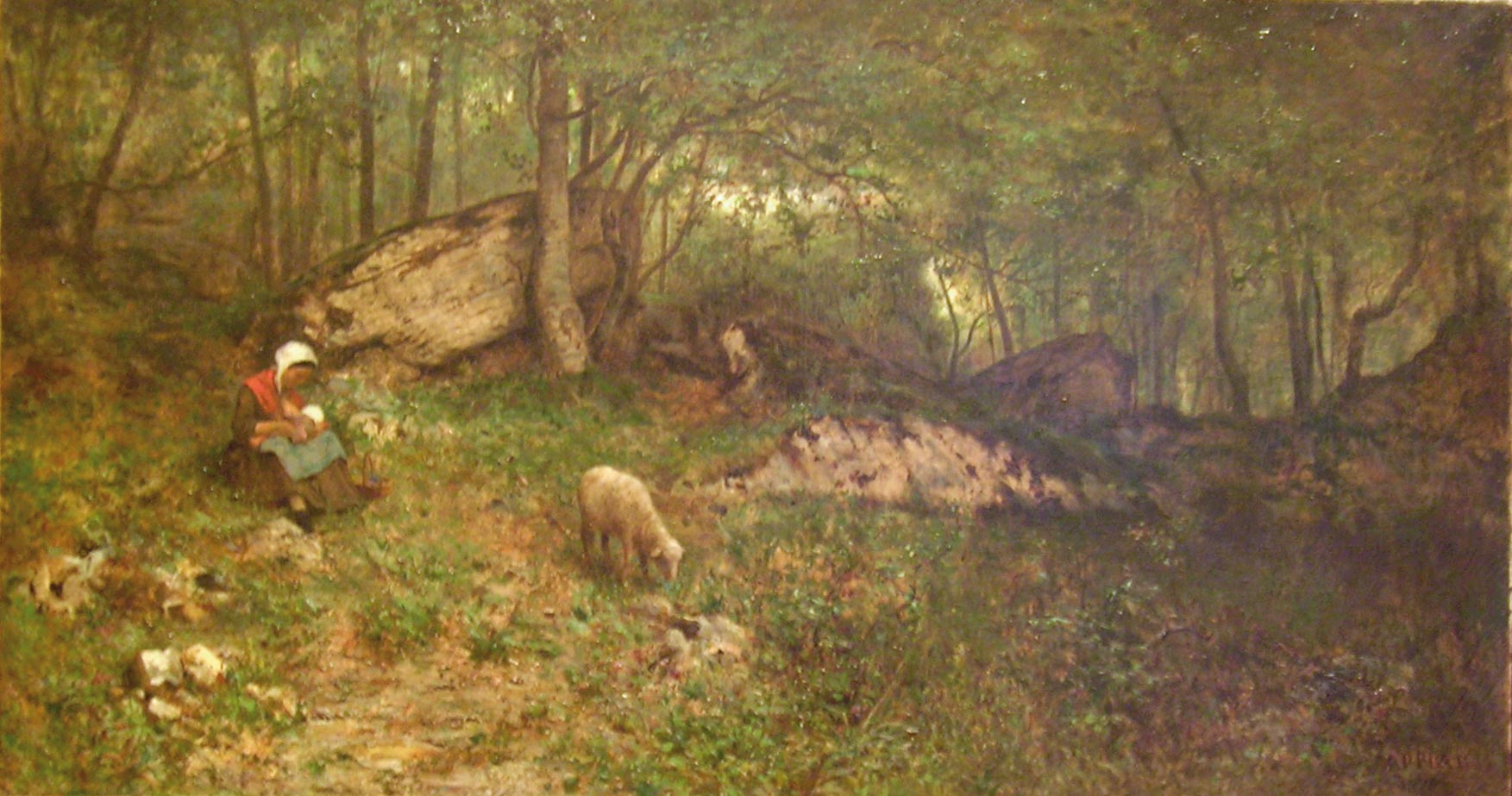
Le Haut du bois des roches (Rossillon), 1870

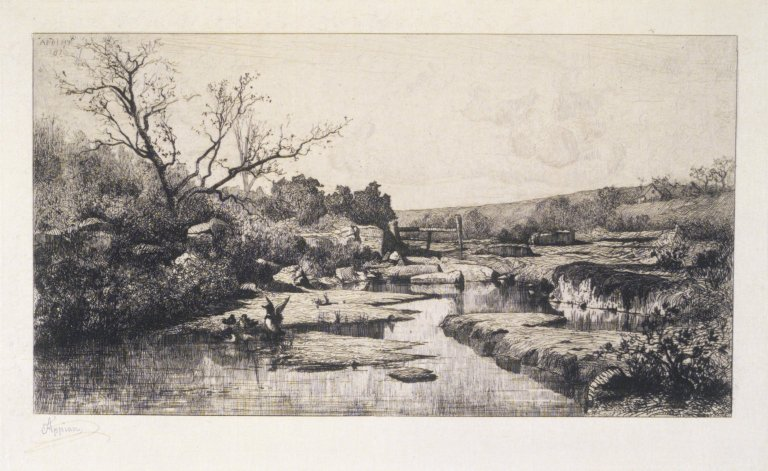
The Source of the Albarine,
ca. 1870

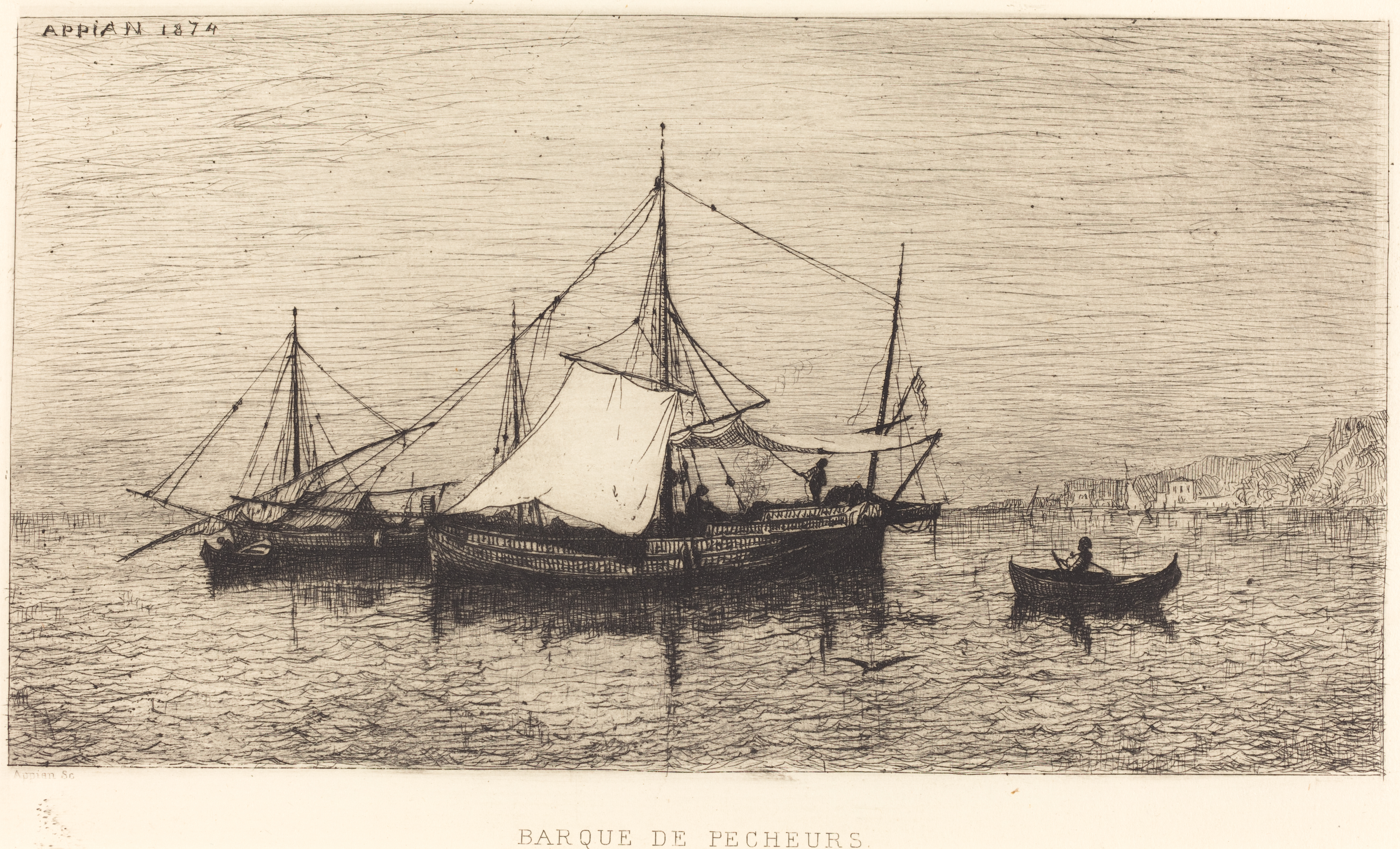
Barque de Pecheurs, 1874, National Gallery of Art

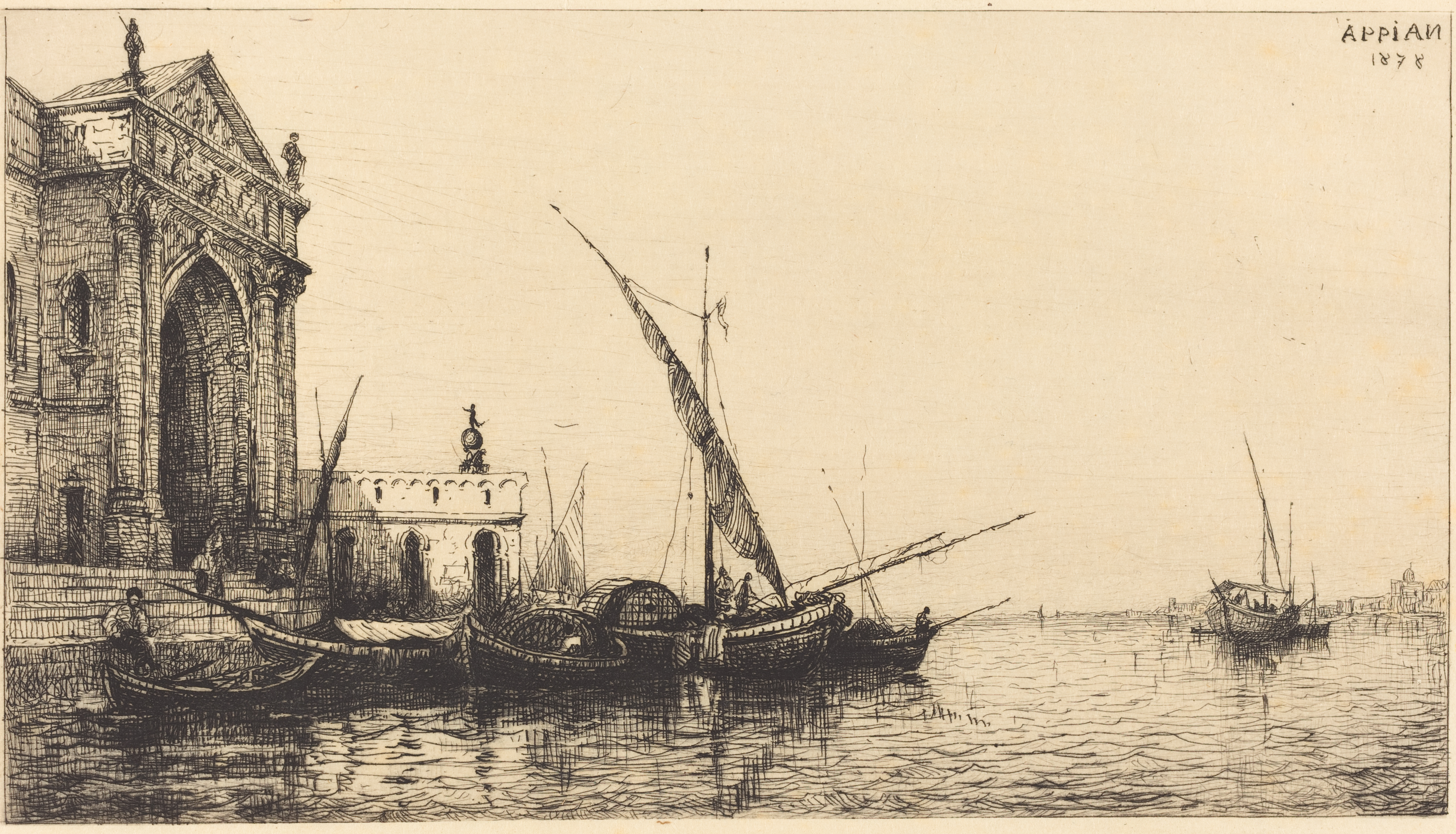
At Venice, 1878, National Gallery of Art

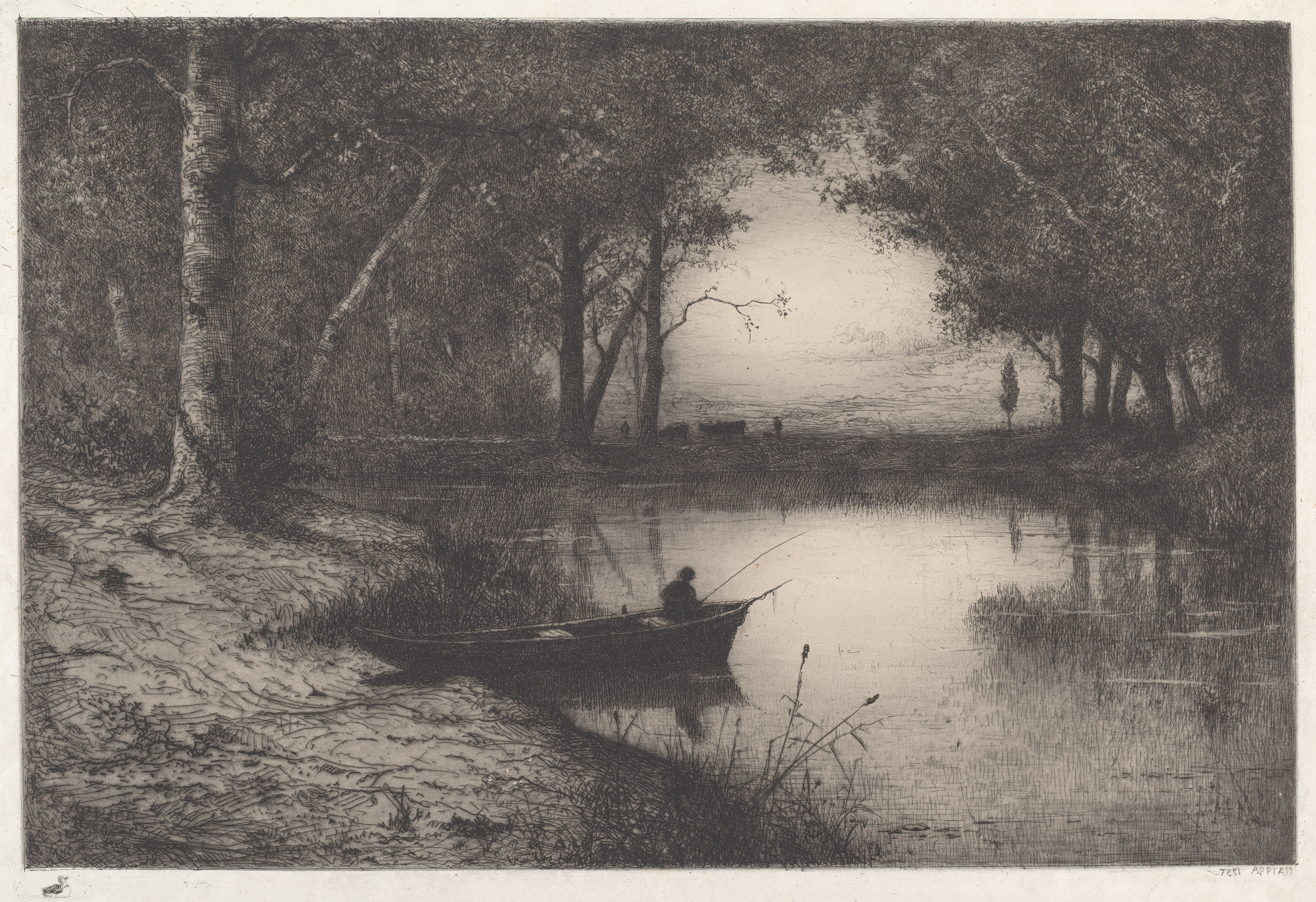
A Fisherman in a Wooded Pond at Evening, 1887, National Gallery of Art

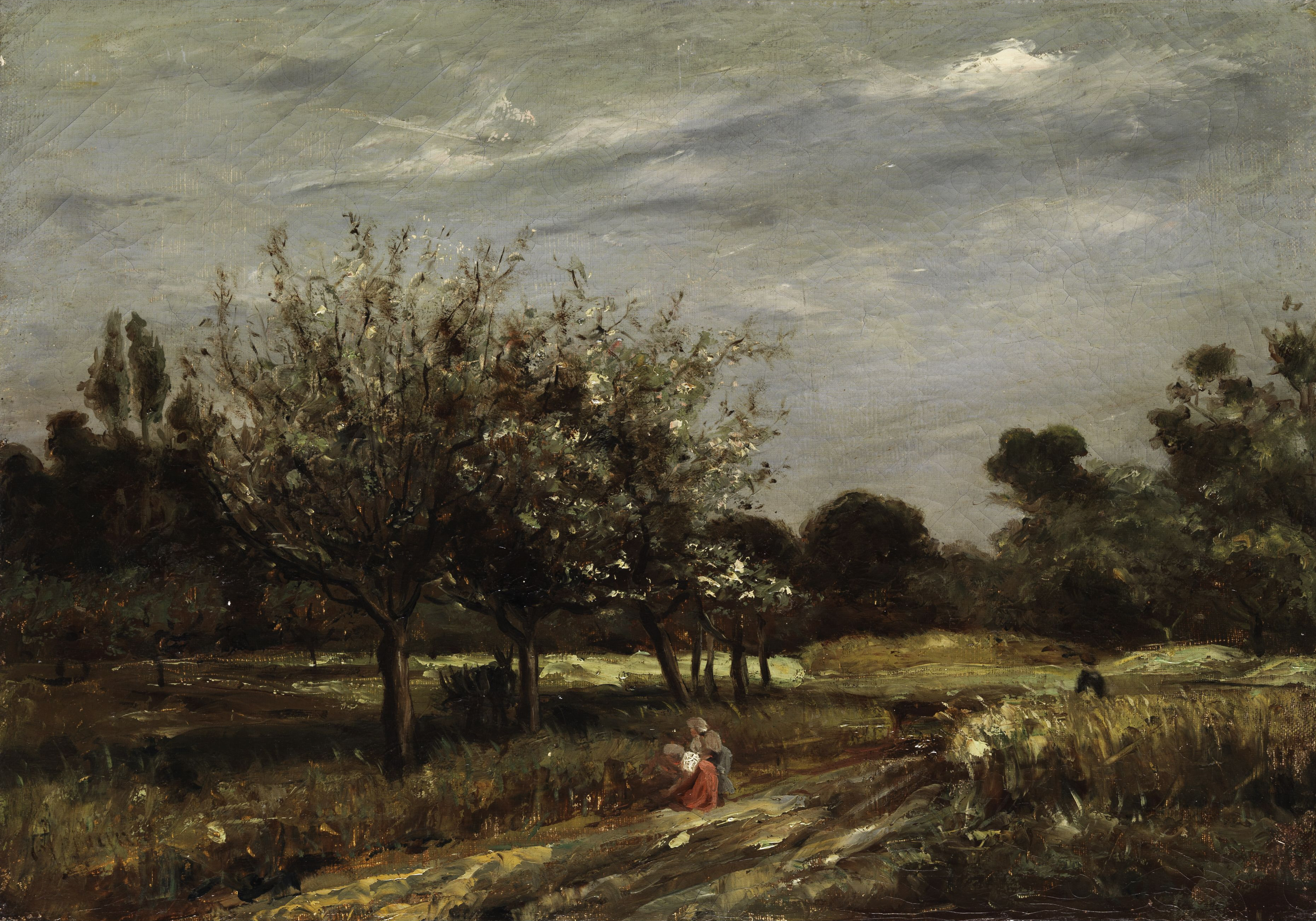
Landscape with Orchard,
by 1898
