= Appias =

Statue of a nymph

In ancient Rome, Appias /ˈæpiəs/ was a statue of a nymph near the Appiades Fountain in the Forum of Caesar. Ovid wrote that the fountain was in the middle of the Temple of Venus Genetrix and surrounded by statues of nymphs who were called "The Appiades" (/əˈpaɪ.ədiːz/; plural form of Appias). Traditionally the Appiades are said to be of Concordia, Minerva, Pax, Venus, and Vesta.

In Roman mythology, Appias was a nymph who lived in the Appian Well outside the temple to Venus Genitrix in the Roman Forum.

In one of his letters, Cicero refers to a statue of Minerva as "Appias". In this case, he derived this surname from the name of Appius Claudius Pulcher, whom he intended to flatter.

== Sources ==
- Dictionary of Greek and Roman Biography and Mythology by William Smith, v. 1, page 248, under Appias
