= Jean-Michel Grobon =

French painter (1770–1853)

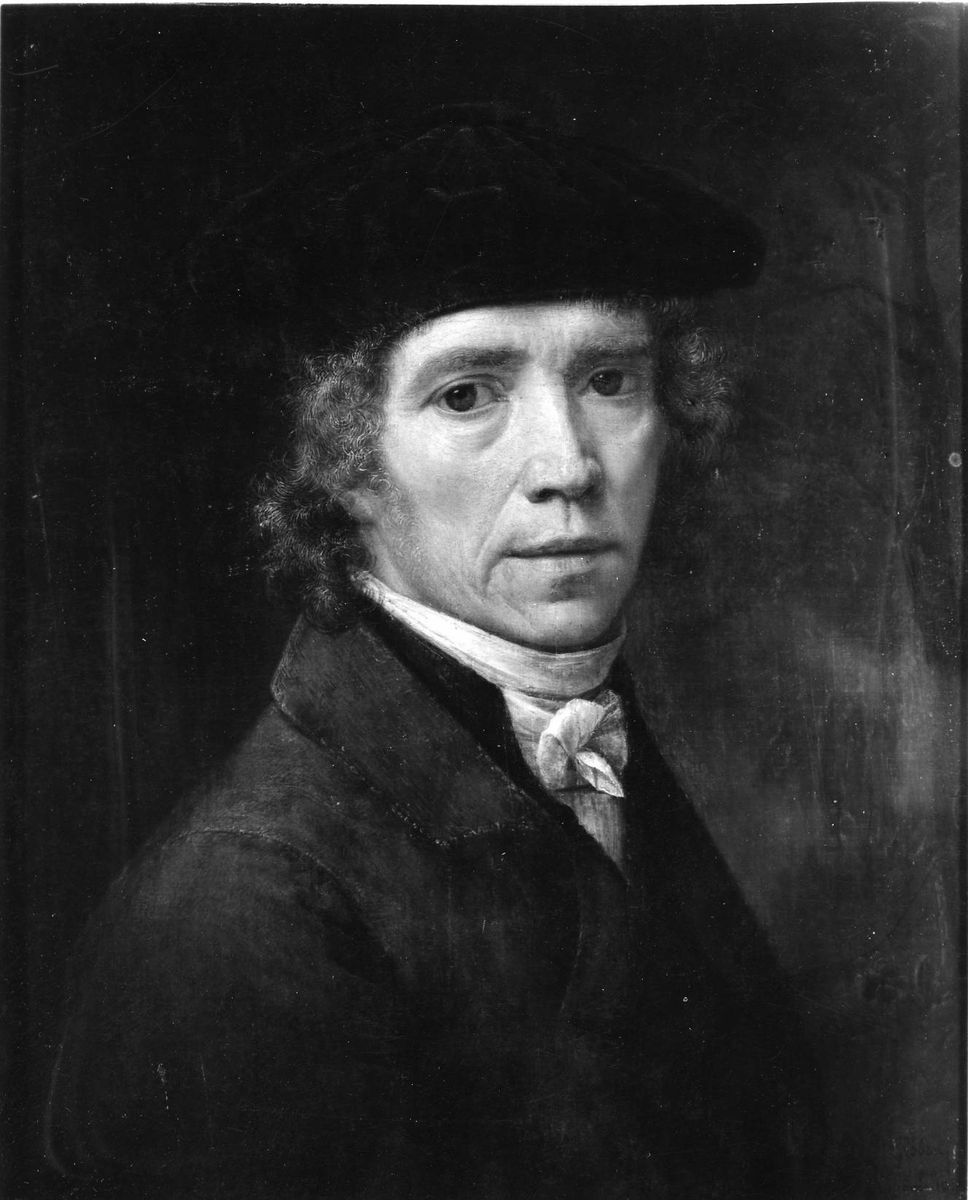
Self-portrait (1844)

Jean-Michel Grobon (19 December 1770, in Lyon – 2 September 1853, in Lyon) was a French painter and engraver; primarily of landscapes and genre scenes. He is considered to be a major representative of the Lyon School.

== Biography ==
His father, Claude, was originally engaged in passementerie, but later became a Master Chef. His mother, Jeanne Chapard, was the daughter of a sugar cane merchant. He was in poor health as a child. At the age of nine, his parents placed him in the local abbey, where he received his primary education and was employed as an altar server. A difficult student, he often got into fights and spent his time in class drawing. In 1782, he was moved to a similar position in Crémieu, where his behavior improved. Two years later, his father sent him to a drawing school in Lyon, where he studied with Alexis Grognard.

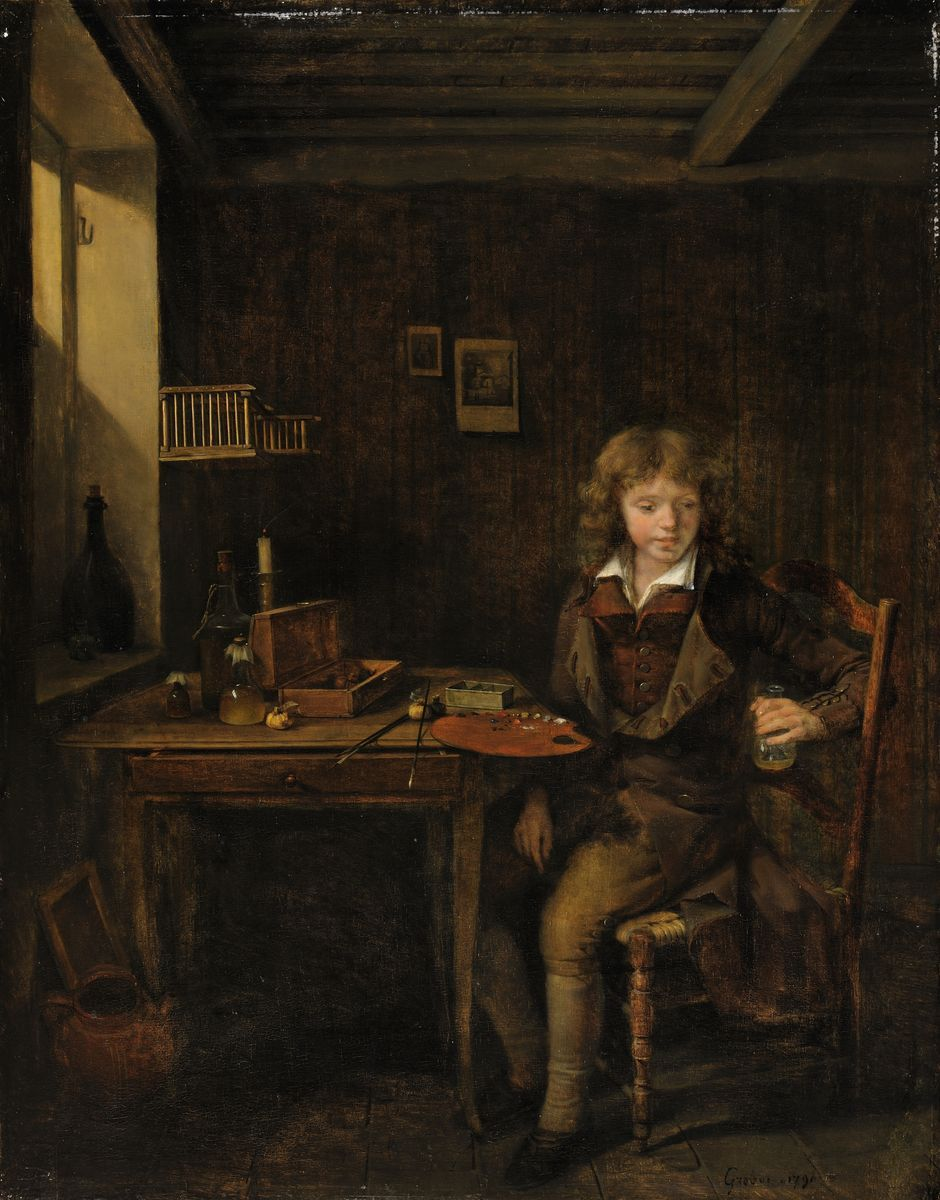
Young Student Preparing his Master's Palette

In 1789, he and a friend went to Paris to register at the Académie royale de peinture et de sculpture. It was then that he created his first paintings. The events of the French Revolution made it impossible to remain there and prevented him from making a planned study trip to Rome. During this time, he supported himself by painting still-lifes and scenes with animals. Shortly, however, he decided to switch to painting landscapes en plein air and moved to La Croix-Rousse, where he lived with the Carthusians. An offer to become a priest was refused.

He was exempt from conscription, but served in the garde bourgeoise; a civil organization. While on a leave, arranged by a friend who was a doctor, his entire unit was killed. He chose not to return to service and was forced to flee. During the Siege of Lyon, he helped his mother hide their personal belongings, then went into hiding. He was found and denounced, but fled again, finding refuge in a friend's aviary. He would later say that he created some of his best paintings there, and he was able to send some of them to the Salon in 1796. It eventually became safe to return to Lyon and he lived in an apartment provided by Jean-Jacques de Boissieu. His contributions to the Salon of 1800 were praised by Jacques-Louis David.

He became a member of the Academy of Lyon and was named a Professor of Drawing at a local school in 1801. His exhibit of landscapes at the Salon of 1806 was a failure, but Napoleon himself ordered that he be given a gold medal and 500 Francs; although he received only 250. The Salon of 1812 was also a disappointment. In 1813, he became one of the first local artists to go on display at the Museum of Fine Arts of Lyon. He then accepted an appointment as a Professor at the École nationale supérieure des beaux-arts de Lyon; having turned down that offer the year before. It is said that he refused the Legion of Honor three times. In 1819, due to his continuous, hectic work pace, he developed rheumatism and began spending time at the spa in Aix-les-Bains.

Upon the outbreak of the July Revolution, the director of the École nationale, François Artaud, fled to Avignon and Victor Prunelle, the mayor of Lyon, asked Grobon to fill the position. He reluctantly agreed, but only on a provisional basis. Prunelle nominated him for the Legion of Honor but, once again, he demurred.

In 1839, suffering from an ulcer, he retired and was replaced by André Blanchard. He also gave up his position on a committee that chose works of art to be acquired by the city. In addition to his considerable savings, he was awarded a life annuity. He continued to take a few private students until his death, at his home, in 1853.

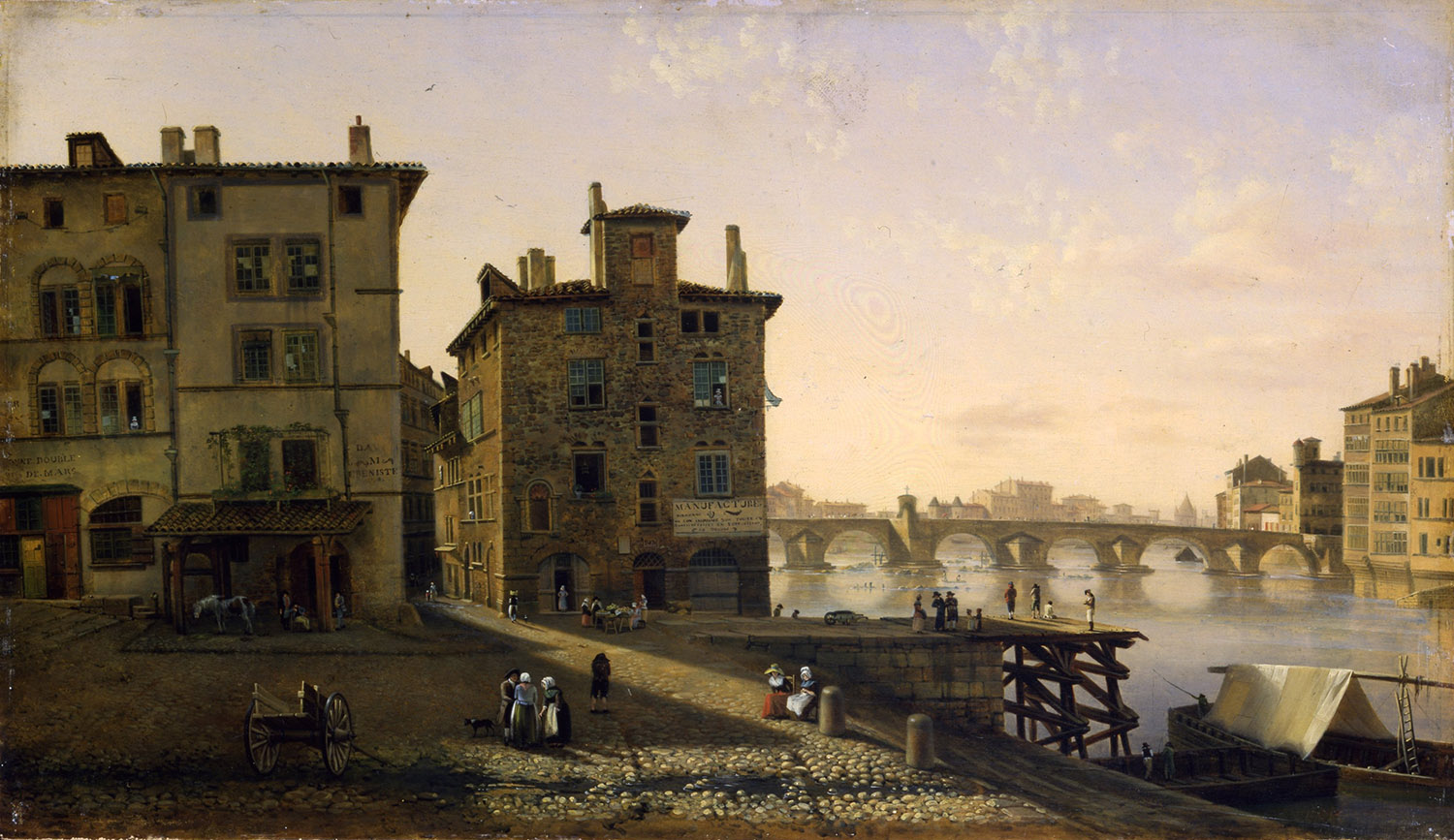
The Old Fishermen's Quarter in Lyon
