= Apian-Gymnasium Ingolstadt =

Coordinates: 48.745°N 11.422°E

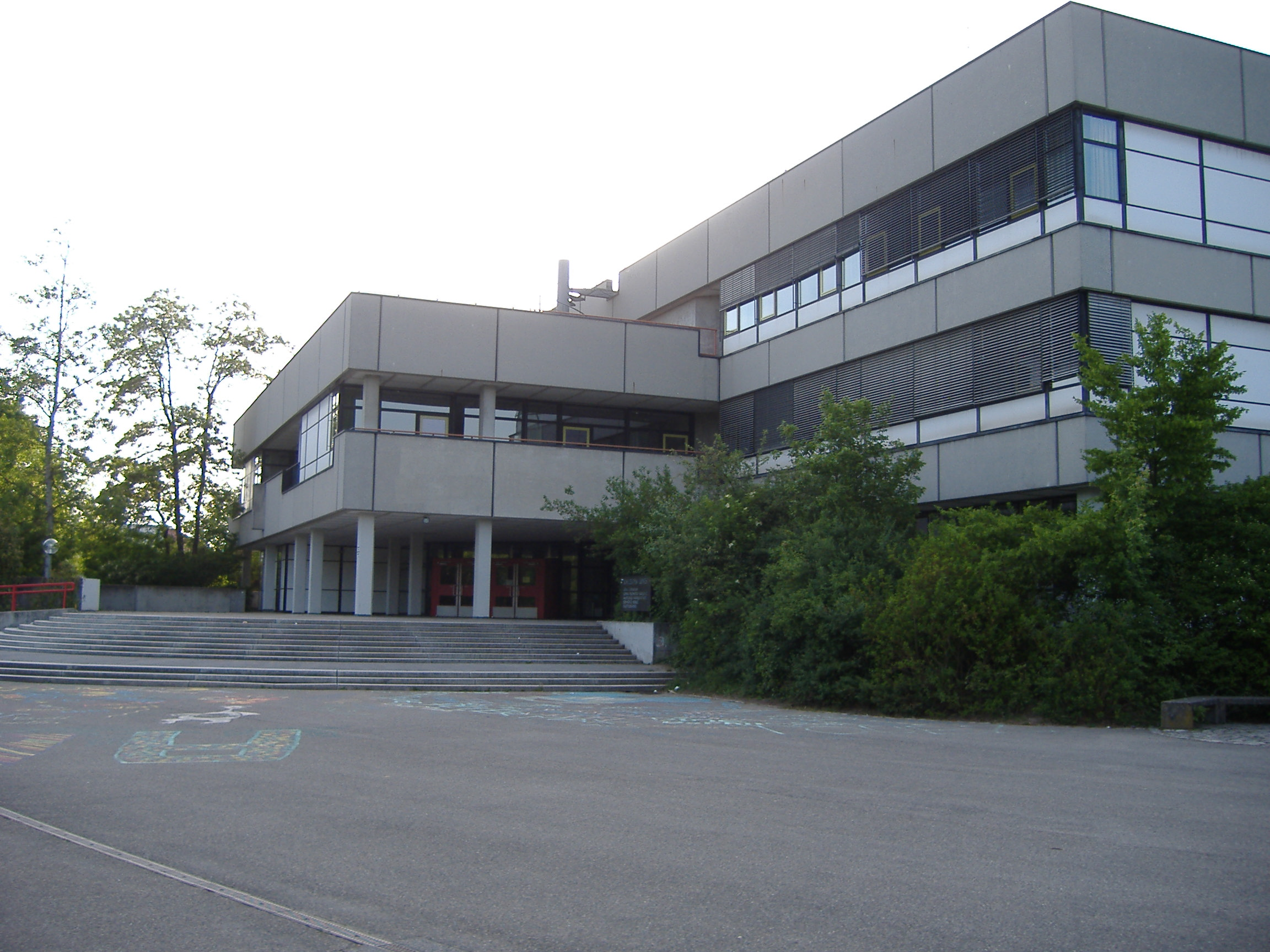
- Ingolstadt, Bavaria

Information
- School type: Gymnasium
- Established: 1971
- Language: German

The Apian-Gymnasium Ingolstadt is a Gymnasium (high school or secondary school) in Ingolstadt, Bavaria established in 1971. It was named after Peter Apian (1495–1552) and his son Philipp Apian. Peter Apian was a mathematician at the University of Ingolstadt, Bavaria's oldest university (which was later moved to Munich). His son Philipp (1531–1589) was his successor as the professor of mathematics at Ingolstadt University and the first cartographer to produce a complete map of Bavaria.

The Apian-Gymnasium is one of Bavaria's centres of excellence. It offers a wide variety of subjects, an inventors' club, a number of exchange programs with France, Scotland and the US, but also playful facilities like a terrarium with snakes and spiders and a large toy train room with to-scale electric toy trains and stations. It enrolled 1,328 students as of the 2023-24 academic year.
