= Appia (Phrygia) =

Town of ancient Phrygia

Coordinates: 39°01′29″N 29°59′03″E

Appia (Ancient Greek: Ἀππία) was a town of ancient Phrygia, inhabited during Hellenistic, Roman, and Byzantine times. According to Pliny the Elder, it belonged to the conventus of Synnada. It became the seat of a bishop in the ecclesiastical province of Phrygia Pacatiana; no longer a residential bishopric, it remains a titular see of the Roman Catholic Church.

Its site is located near Pınarcık in Asiatic Turkey.
