= Symphony in White =

Symphony in White can refer to one of several paintings by James Abbott McNeill Whistler

- Symphony in White, No. 1: The White Girl (1861-2)
- Symphony in White, No. 2: The Little White Girl (1864-5)
- Symphony in White, No. 3 (1865-7)
