= Symphony in White, No. 1: The White Girl =

Painting by James McNeill Whistler

- Artist: James McNeill Whistler
- Year: 1861–1863
- Medium: Oil on canvas
- Dimensions: 213 cm × 107.9 cm (83.9 in × 42.5 in)
- Location: National Gallery of Art, Washington, D.C.
- Accession: 1943.6.2

Symphony in White, No. 1, also known as The White Girl, is a painting by James McNeill Whistler. The work shows a woman in full figure standing on a wolf skin in front of a beige curtain with a lily in her hand. The colour scheme of the painting is almost entirely white. The model is Joanna Hiffernan, the artist's mistress. Though the painting was originally called The White Girl, Whistler later started calling it Symphony in White, No. 1. By referring to his work in such abstract terms, he intended to emphasize his "art for art's sake" philosophy.

Whistler created the painting in the winter of 1861–62, though he later returned to it and made alterations. It was rejected both at the Royal Academy and at the Salon in Paris, but eventually accepted at the Salon des Refusés in 1863. This exhibition also featured Édouard Manet's famous Déjeuner sur l'herbe, and together the two works drew much attention. The White Girl shows clearly the influence of the Pre-Raphaelite Brotherhood, with whom Whistler had recently come in contact. The painting has been interpreted by later art critics both as an allegory of innocence and its loss, and as a religious allusion to the Virgin Mary.

== Artist and model ==
James Abbott McNeill Whistler was born in the United States in 1834, the son of George Washington Whistler, a railway engineer. In 1843, his father relocated the family to Saint Petersburg, Russia, where James received training in painting. After a stay in England, he returned to America to attend the US Military Academy at West Point in 1851. In 1855, he made his way back to Europe, determined to dedicate himself to painting. He settled in Paris at first, but in 1859 moved to London, where he would spend most of the remainder of his life. There he met Dante Gabriel Rossetti and other members of the Pre-Raphaelite Brotherhood, who would have a profound influence on Whistler.

It was also in London that Whistler met Joanna Heffernan, the model who would become his lover. Their relationship has been referred to as a "marriage without benefit of clergy." By 1861, Whistler had already used her as a model for another painting. Wapping, named after Wapping in London where Whistler lived, was begun in 1860, though not finished until 1864. It shows a woman and two men on a balcony overlooking the river. According to Whistler himself, the woman – portrayed by Heffernan – was a prostitute. Heffernan supposedly had a strong influence over Whistler; his brother-in-law Francis Seymour Haden refused a dinner invitation in the winter of 1863–64 due to her dominant presence in the household.

== Creation and reception ==
Whistler started working on The White Girl shortly after December 3, 1861, with the intention of submitting it to the prestigious annual exhibition of the Royal Academy. In spite of bouts of illness, he had finished the painting by April. In a letter to George du Maurier in early 1862, he described it as:

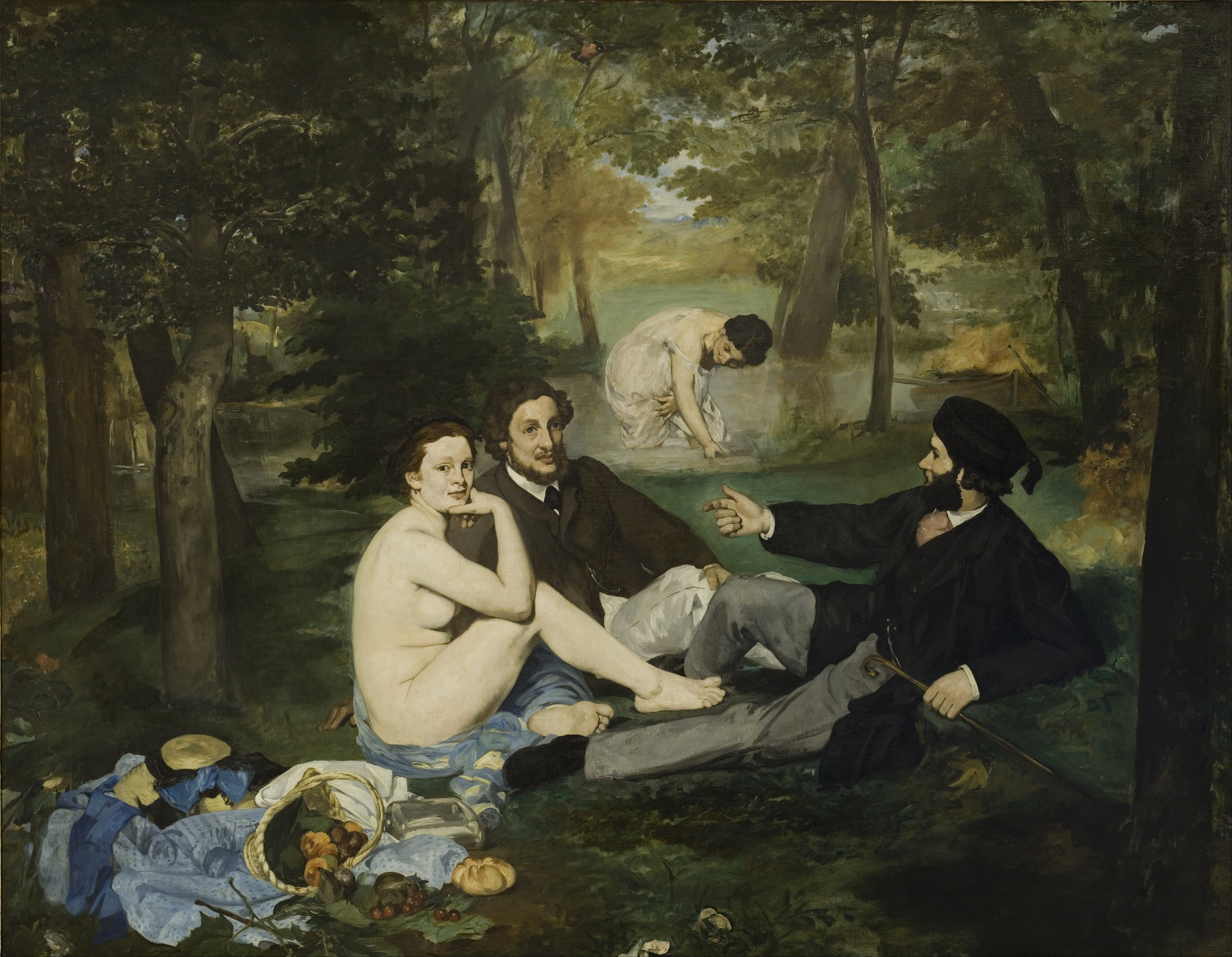
Édouard Manet's Le Déjeuner sur l'herbe caused a stir at the 1863 Salon des Refusés, but the attention given to Whistler's White Girl was even greater.

...a woman in a beautiful white cambric dress, standing against a window which filters the light through a transparent white muslin curtain – but the figure receives a strong light from the right and therefore the picture, barring the red hair, is one gorgeous mass of brilliant white.

The portrait was created as a simple study in white; however, others saw it differently. The critic Jules-Antoine Castagnary thought the painting an allegory of a new bride's lost innocence. Others linked it to Wilkie Collins's The Woman in White, a popular novel of the time, or various other literary sources. In the painting, Hiffernan holds a lily in her left hand and stands upon a wolf skin rug (interpreted by some to represent masculinity and lust) with the wolf's head staring menacingly at the viewer.

Whistler submitted the painting to the Academy, but according to Heffernan, he expected it to be rejected at this point. The previous year, in 1861, another painting had caused a minor scandal. Edwin Henry Landseer's The Shrew Tamed showed a horse with a woman resting on the ground nearby. The model was named as Ann Gilbert, a noted equestrienne of the period: however it was soon rumoured that it was actually Catherine Walters, the notorious London courtesan. Whistler's painting was reminiscent enough of Landseer's that the judges were wary of admitting it. White Girl was submitted to the Academy along with three etchings, all three of which were accepted, while the painting was not.

Whistler exhibited it at the small Berners Street Gallery in London instead, where it was shown under the title The Woman in White, a reference to the novel of that name by Wilkie Collins, which was a popular success at the time. The book was a tale of romance, intrigue and double identity, and was considered a bit of a sensation at the time of its publication. Du Maurier apparently believed that the painting referred to the novel. The review in the Athenaeum complained that the painting did not correspond to the character in the novel, prompting Whistler to write a letter asserting that the gallery chose the title without consulting him, adding "I had no intention whatsoever of illustrating Mr Wilkie Collins' novel. My painting simply represents a girl dressed in white standing in front of a white curtain."

The next year, Whistler tried to have the painting exhibited at the Salon in Paris – the official art exhibition of the Académie des Beaux-Arts – but it was rejected there as well. Instead, it was accepted at the alternative Salon des Refusés – the "exhibition of rejects" that opened on May 15, two weeks after the official Salon.

The 1863 Salon des Refusés was the same exhibition where Édouard Manet's Déjeuner sur l'herbe caused a scandal, yet the attention given to Whistler's White Girl was even greater. The controversy surrounding the paintings was described in Émile Zola's novel L'Œuvre (1886). The reception Whistler's painting received was mostly favourable, however, and largely vindicated him after the rejection he had experienced both in London and in Paris. It was greatly admired by his colleagues and friends Manet, the painter Gustave Courbet, and the poet Charles Baudelaire. The art critic Théophile Thoré-Bürger saw it in the tradition of Goya and Velázquez. Lisa Peters summarises that countering criticism by traditionalists, Whistler's supporters insisted that the painting was "an apparition with a spiritual content" and that it epitomized his theory that art should be concerned essentially with the arrangement of colors in harmony, not with a literal portrayal of the natural world. There were, however, those who were less favourable; certain French critics saw the English Pre-Raphaelite trend as somewhat eccentric.

The painting remained in the Whistler family until 1896, when it was sold by the artist's nephew to art collector Harris Whittemore. In 1943, the Whittemore family gave it as a gift to the National Gallery of Art in Washington, D.C.

== Composition and interpretation ==
Whistler, especially in his later career, resented the idea that his paintings should have any meaning beyond what could be seen on the canvas. He is known as a central proponent of the "art for art's sake" philosophy. His comment on The White Girl denying a connection to Wilkie Collins' novel The Woman in White is one of the earliest of these assertions ("My painting simply represents a girl dressed in white standing in front of a white curtain.") Because English critics saw the painting as an illustration, they tended to be less favorable than their French colleagues, who saw it as a visionary, poetic fantasy. One English critic, referring to Collins' novel, called The White Girl "...one of the most incomplete paintings we ever met with." Since the Berners Street Gallery had used the name The Woman in White for the painting, critics were disappointed with its lack of resemblance to the novel's heroine. Whistler, who had never even read the novel, resented the comparison. About 10 years later, he began referring to the painting as Symphony in White, No. 1, though a French critic had called it a Symphonie du blanc already at the time of its exhibition in Paris. By the musical analogy, he further emphasized his philosophy that the composition was the central thing, not the subject matter. The title was probably also inspired by Théophile Gautier's 1852 poem Symphonie en Blanc Majeur.

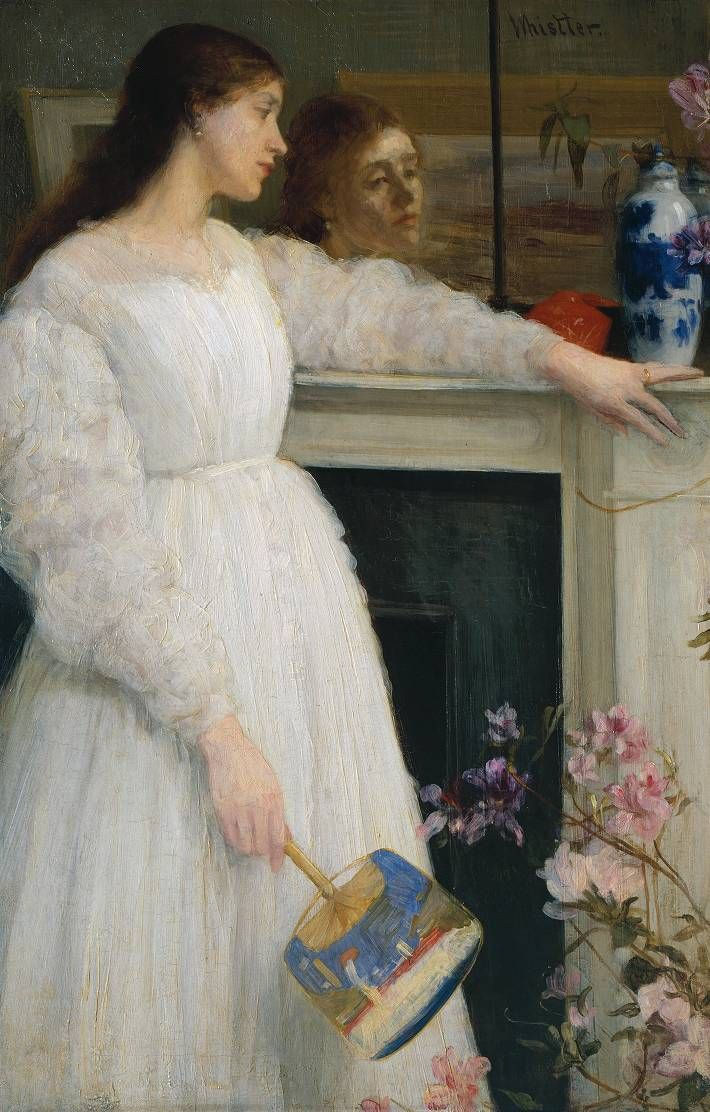
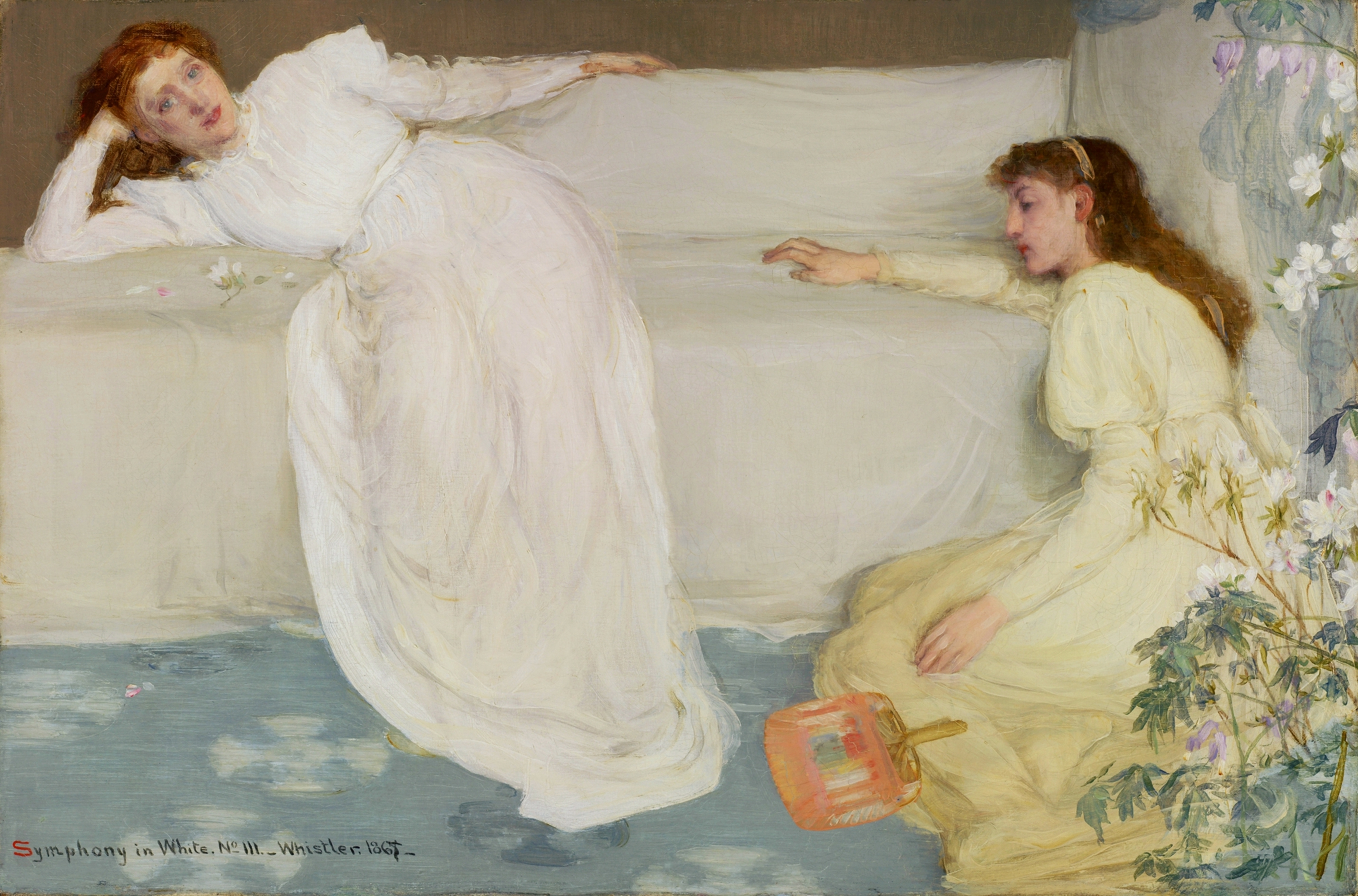
Women dressed in white was a theme to which Whistler would return in his Symphony in White, No. 2 and Symphony in White, No. 3.

Whistler was not entirely content with the realism the painting displayed in its original form, a trait he blamed on the influence Courbet had on him at the time. Later, between 1867 and 1872, he reworked it to give it a more spiritual expression. Even though Symphony was begun before Whistler first met Rossetti, the Pre-Raphaelite influence is still clear. The painting was an early experiment in white on white, with a woman standing in a white dress in front of a white background. This color scheme was a subject he would return to later, in two paintings that would be given the titles of Symphony in White, No. 2 (1864) and Symphony in White, No. 3 (1865–1867). The panel is long and slender, and the model's pose and the shape of her clothes further emphasize the vertical nature of the painting. The woman is bold, almost confrontational, in her direct gaze at the viewer, and her features are highly individualized. Art critic Hilton Kramer sees in Whistler's portraits a charm and a combination of craft and observational skills that his more radical landscapes lacked.

Though Whistler himself resented attempts to analyze the meaning of his art, this has not deterred later critics from doing so. The 19th-century French art critic Jules-Antoine Castagnary saw in the painting symbols of lost innocence, a theme that has been picked up by later critics. The art historian E. Wayne Craven also sees the painting as more than a formalist exercise, and finds "enigmatic, expressive and even erotic undercurrents" in the image. He points to the contrasts presented by the imagery, with the white lily representing innocence and virginity, and the fierce wolf head on the rug symbolizing the loss of innocence. Beryl Schlossman, coming from the perspective of literary criticism, sees allusions to the Madonna of religious art in the work. To Schlossman, the rug under the woman's feet is the cloud on which the Virgin is often seen standing, and the wolf is the serpent, crushed under her heel.

== See also ==
- List of paintings by James McNeill Whistler

== Sources ==
- Anderson, Ronald; Koval, Anne (1994). James McNeill Whistler: Beyond the Myth. London: John Murray. ISBN 0-7195-5027-0.
- Batchelor, Bob (2002). The 1900s. Westport, Conn.; London: Greenwood Press. ISBN 0-313-31334-2.
- Craven, Wayne (2003). American Art: History and Culture. New York: McGraw-Hill. ISBN 0-07-141524-6.
- Kramer, Hilton; Roger Kimball (1974). The Age of the Avant-Garde: An Art Chronicle of 1956-1972. London: Secker and Warburg. ISBN 0-436-23685-0.
- MacDonald, Margaret F. (1999). "Whistler, James (Abbott) McNeill". Grove Art Online. Oxford: Oxford University Press.
- Newton, Joy; Margaret F. MacDonald (1978). "Whistler: Search for a European Reputation". Zeitschrift für Kunstgeschichte. 41 (2): 148–159. doi:10.2307/1481962. JSTOR 1481962.
- Schlossman, Beryl (1999). Objects of Desire: The Madonnas of Modernism. Ithaca; London: Cornell University Press. p. 195. ISBN 0-8014-3649-4.
- Spencer, Robin (1998). "Whistler's 'The White Girl': Painting, Poetry and Meaning". The Burlington Magazine. 140 (1142): 300–311. JSTOR 887886.
- Spencer, Robin (2004). "Whistler, James Abbott McNeill". Oxford Dictionary of National Biography (online ed.). Oxford University Press. doi:10.1093/ref:odnb/36855. (Subscription, Wikipedia Library access or UK public library membership required.)
- Taylor, Hilary (1978). James McNeill Whistler. London: Studio Vista. ISBN 0-289-70836-2.
- Weintraub, Stanley (1974). Whistler: A biography. London: Collins. ISBN 0-00-211994-3.
