= Salon des Refusés =

Art exhibition in Paris, first held in 1863

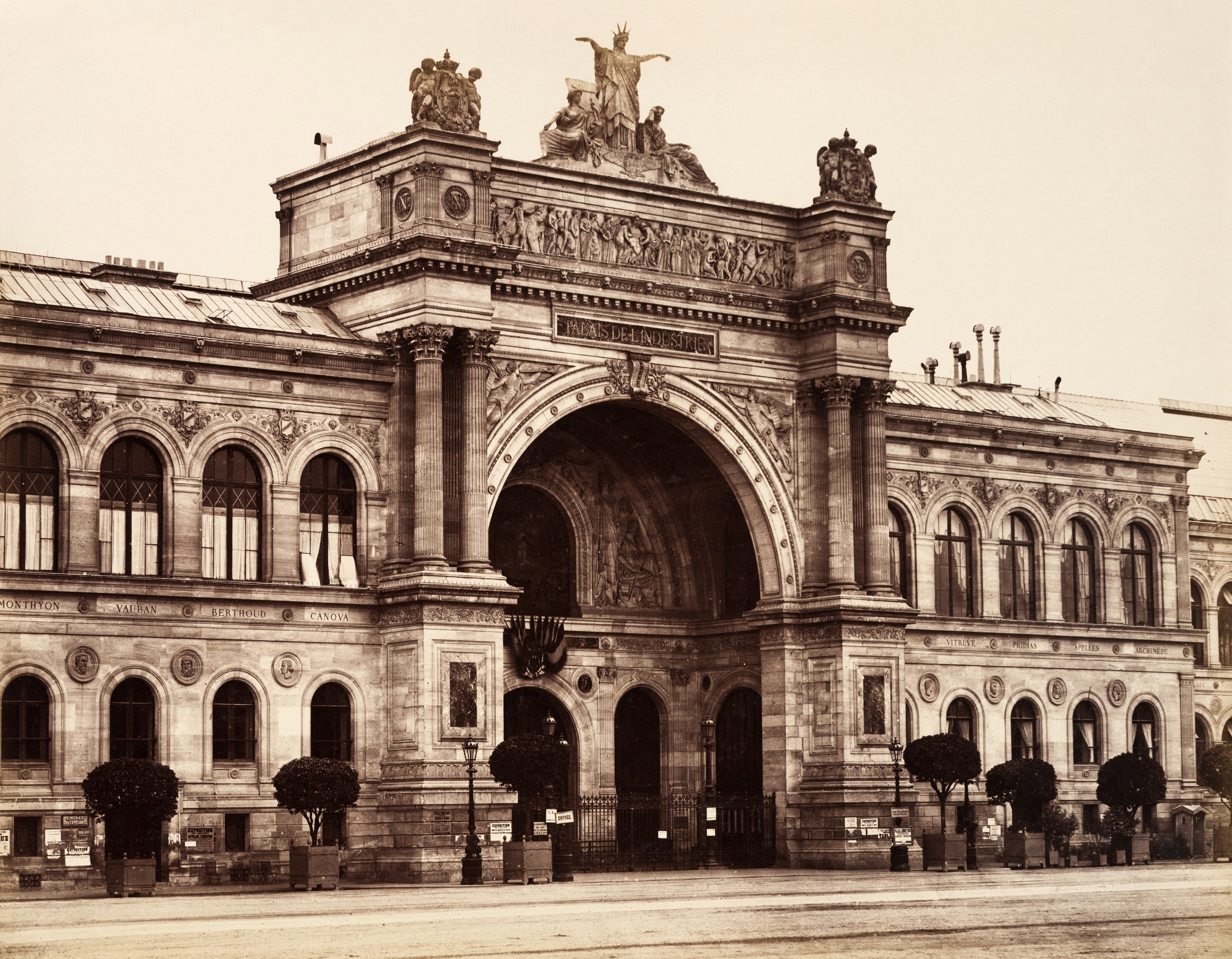
The Palais de l'Industrie, where the event took place. Photo by Édouard Baldus.

The Salon des Refusés, French for "exhibition of rejects" (French pronunciation: [salɔ̃ de ʁəfyze]), is generally known as an exhibition of works rejected by the jury of the official Paris Salon, but the term is most famously used to refer to the Salon des Refusés of 1863.

Today, by extension, salon des refusés refers to any exhibition of works rejected from a juried art show.

== Background of the Salon of 1863 ==
The Paris Salon, sponsored by the French government and the Academy of Fine Arts, took place annually, and was an exhibition of the best academic art. A medal from the Salon was assurance of a successful artistic career; winners were given official commissions by the French government and were sought after for portraits and private commissions. Since the 18th century, the paintings were classified by genre, following a hierarchy; history paintings were ranked first, followed by the portrait, the landscape, the "genre scene" and the still life. The jury, headed by the Comte de Nieuwerkerke, the head of the Academy of Fine Arts, was very conservative; near-photographic but idealized realism was expected.

Much intrigue often went on to get acceptance, and to be given a good place in the galleries. In 1851, Gustave Courbet managed to get one painting into the Salon, Enterrement à Ornans, and in 1852 his Baigneuses was accepted, scandalizing critics and the public, who expected romanticized nudes in classical settings, but in 1855 the Salon refused all of Courbet's paintings. As early as the 1830s, Paris art galleries mounted small, private exhibitions of works rejected by the Salon jurors. Courbet was obliged to organize his own exhibit, called The Pavillon of Realism, at a private gallery. Private exhibits attracted far less attention from the press and patrons, and limited the access of the artists to a small public.

In 1863 the Salon jury refused two thirds of the paintings presented, including the works of Gustave Courbet, Édouard Manet, Camille Pissarro, Antoine Chintreuil, and Johan Jongkind. The rejected artists and their friends protested, and the protests reached Emperor Napoleon III. The Emperor's tastes in art were traditional; he commissioned and bought works by artists such as Alexandre Cabanel and Franz Xaver Winterhalter, but he was also sensitive to public opinion. His office issued a statement: "Numerous complaints have come to the Emperor on the subject of the works of art which were refused by the jury of the Exposition. His Majesty, wishing to let the public judge the legitimacy of these complaints, has decided that the works of art which were refused should be displayed in another part of the Palace of Industry."

More than a thousand visitors a day visited the Salon des Refusés. The journalist Émile Zola reported that visitors pushed to get into the crowded galleries where the refused paintings were hung, and the rooms were full of the laughter of the spectators. Critics and the public ridiculed the refusés, which included such famous paintings as Édouard Manet's Déjeuner sur l'herbe and James McNeill Whistler's Symphony in White, No. 1: The White Girl. The critical attention also legitimized the emerging avant-garde in painting. The Impressionists exhibited their works outside the traditional Salon beginning in 1874. Subsequent Salons des Refusés were mounted in Paris in 1874, 1875, and 1886, by which time the popularity of the Paris Salon had declined for those who were more interested in Impressionism.

== Works in the exhibition ==
=== Le déjeuner sur l'herbe ===
The Luncheon on the Grass
- Le déjeuner sur l'herbe (French)
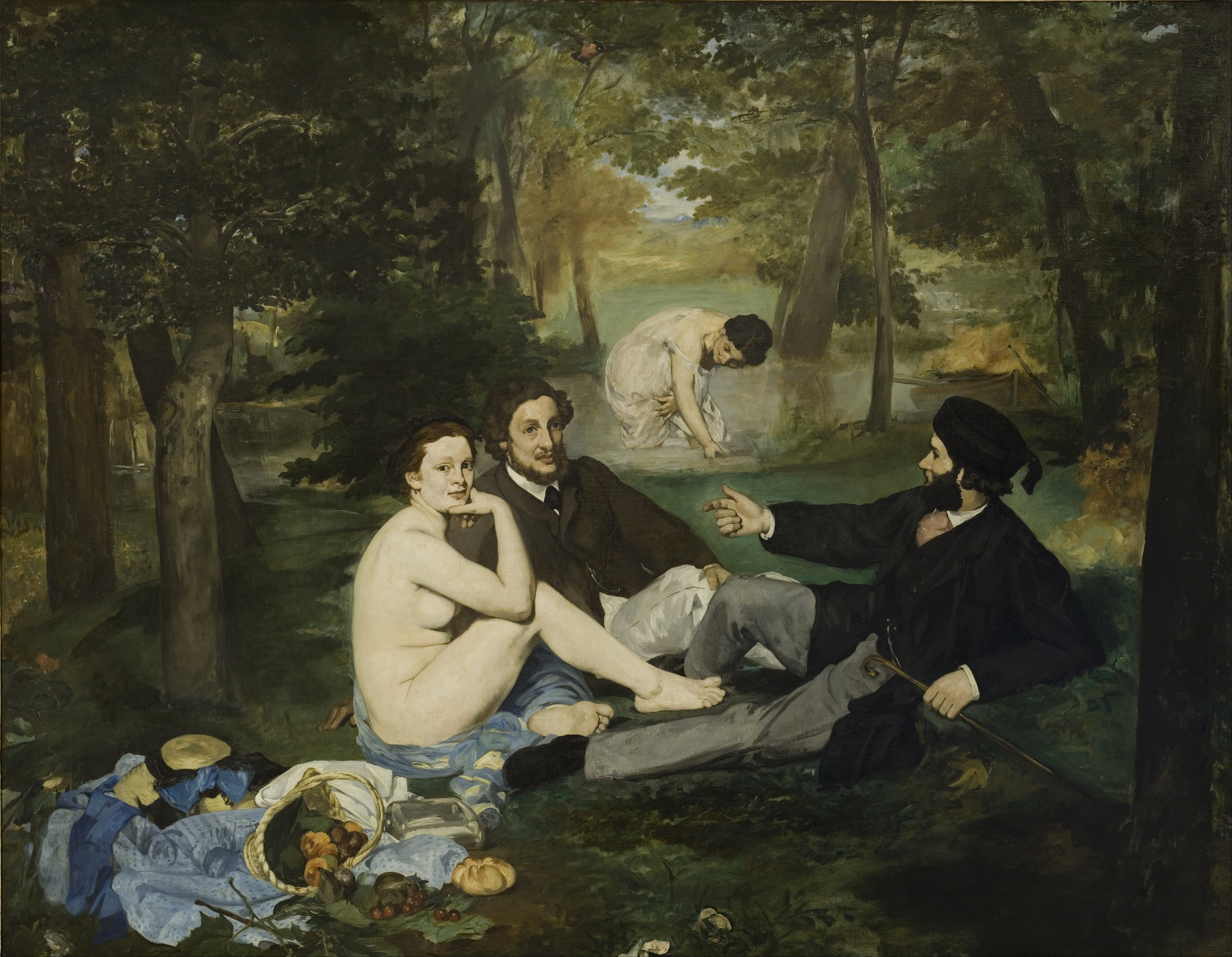
- Artist: Édouard Manet
- Year: 1862–1863
- Medium: Oil on canvas
- Dimensions: 208 cm × 265.5 cm (81.9 in × 104.5 in)
- Location: Musée d'Orsay, Paris

Rejected by the Salon jury of 1863, Manet seized the opportunity to exhibit Déjeuner sur l'herbe and two other paintings in the 1863 Salon des Refusés. Déjeuner sur l'herbe depicts the juxtaposition of a female nude and a scantily dressed female bather in the background, on a picnic with two fully dressed men in a rural setting. The painting sparked public notoriety and stirred up controversy and has remained controversial, even to this day. There is a discussion of it, from this point of view, in Proust's Remembrance of Things Past.

One interpretation of the work is that it depicts the rampant prostitution in the Bois de Boulogne, a large park at the western outskirts of Paris, at the time. This prostitution was common knowledge in Paris, but was considered a taboo subject unsuitable for a painting.

Émile Zola comments about Déjeuner sur l'herbe:

The Luncheon on the Grass is the greatest work of Édouard Manet, one in which he realizes the dream of all painters: to place figures of natural grandeur in a landscape. We know the power with which he vanquished this difficulty. There are some leaves, some tree trunks, and, in the background, a river in which a chemise-wearing woman bathes; in the foreground, two young men are seated across from a second woman who has just exited the water and who dries her naked skin in the open air. This nude woman has scandalized the public, who see only her in the canvas. My God! What indecency: a woman without the slightest covering between two clothed men! That has never been seen. And this belief is a gross error, for in the Louvre there are more than fifty paintings in which are found mixes of persons clothed and nude. But no one goes to the Louvre to be scandalized. The crowd has kept itself moreover from judging The Luncheon on the Grass like a veritable work of art should be judged; they see in it only some people who are having a picnic, finishing bathing, and they believed that the artist had placed an obscene intent in the disposition of the subject, while the artist had simply sought to obtain vibrant oppositions and a straightforward audience. Painters, especially Édouard Manet, who is an analytic painter, do not have this preoccupation with the subject which torments the crowd above all; the subject, for them, is merely a pretext to paint, while for the crowd, the subject alone exists. Thus, assuredly, the nude woman of The Luncheon on the Grass is only there to furnish the artist the occasion to paint a bit of flesh. That which must be seen in the painting is not a luncheon on the grass; it is the entire landscape, with its vigors and its finesses, with its foregrounds so large, so solid, and its backgrounds of a light delicateness; it is this firm modeled flesh under great spots of light, these tissues supple and strong, and particularly this delicious silhouette of a woman wearing a chemise who makes, in the background, an adorable dapple of white in the milieu of green leaves. It is, in short, this vast ensemble, full of atmosphere, this corner of nature rendered with a simplicity so just, all of this admirable page in which an artist has placed all the particular and rare elements which are in him.

Émile Zola incorporated a fictionalized account of the 1863 scandal in his novel L'Œuvre (The Masterpiece) (1886).

=== Symphony in White no 1 ===
Symphony in White, No. 1: The White Girl
- Artist: James McNeill Whistler
- Year: 1861–62
- Medium: Oil on canvas
- Dimensions: 215 cm × 108 cm (84.5 in × 42.5 in)
- Location: National Gallery of Art, Washington, D.C.

In 1861, after returning to Paris for a time, James Abbott McNeill Whistler painted his first famous work, Symphony in White, No. 1: The White Girl. This portrait of his mistress and business manager Joanna Hiffernan was created as a simple study in white; however, others saw it differently. The critic Jules-Antoine Castagnary thought the painting an allegory of a new bride's lost innocence. Others linked it to Wilkie Collins's The Woman in White, a popular novel of the time, or various other literary sources. In England, some considered it a painting in the Pre-Raphaelite manner. In the painting, Hiffernan holds a lily in her left hand and stands upon a wolf skin rug (interpreted by some to represent masculinity and lust) with the wolf's head staring menacingly at the viewer.

Countering criticism by traditionalists, Whistler's supporters insisted that the painting was "an apparition with a spiritual content" and that it epitomized his theory that art should be concerned essentially with the arrangement of colors in harmony, not with a literal portrayal of the natural world.

Whistler started working on The White Girl shortly after December 3, 1861, with the intention of submitting it to the prestigious annual exhibition of the Royal Academy. In spite of bouts of illness, he finished the painting by April. The white paint Whistler used contained lead, and his work on the seven-foot-high canvas had given the artist a dose of lead poisoning. The portrait was refused for exhibition at the conservative Royal Academy in London. Whistler then submitted the painting to the Paris Salon of 1863, where it was also rejected. The public was able to see the painting exhibited with other rejected works, in the Salon des Refusés. The Salon des Refusés was an event sanctioned by Emperor Napoleon III, to appease the large number of artists who joined forces to protest the harsh jury decisions in 1863. Of the over 5,000 paintings submitted in 1863, 2,217 were rejected.

In a letter to George du Maurier in early 1862 Whistler wrote of the painting:

... a woman in a beautiful white cambric dress, standing against a window which filters the light through a transparent white muslin curtain – but the figure receives a strong light from the right and therefore the picture, barring the red hair, is one gorgeous mass of brilliant white.

Whistler submitted the painting to the Academy, but according to Joanna Hiffernan, he expected it to be rejected. The previous year, in 1861, another painting had caused a minor scandal. Edwin Henry Landseer's The Shrew Tamed showed a horse with a woman resting on the ground nearby. The model was named as Ann Gilbert, a noted equestrienne of the period, however it was soon rumored that it was actually Catherine Walters, the notorious London courtesan. Whistler's painting was reminiscent enough of Landseer's that the judges were wary of admitting it. White Girl was submitted to the Academy along with three etchings, all three of which were accepted, while the painting was not. Whistler exhibited it at the small Berners Street Gallery in London instead. The next year, Whistler tried to have the painting exhibited at the Salon in Paris – the official art exhibition of the Académie des Beaux-Arts – but it was rejected there as well. Instead, it was accepted at the alternative Salon des Refusés – the "exhibition of rejects" that opened on May 15, two weeks after the official Salon.

Although Whistler's painting was widely noticed, he was upstaged by Manet's more shocking painting Le déjeuner sur l'herbe. The controversy surrounding the paintings was described in Émile Zola's novel L'Œuvre (1886). The reception Whistler's painting received was mostly favourable, however, and largely vindicated him after the rejection he had experienced both in London and in Paris. The painting was greatly admired by his colleagues and friends Manet, the painter Gustave Courbet and the poet Charles Baudelaire. The art critic Théophile Thoré-Bürger saw it in the tradition of Goya and Velázquez. There were, however, those who were less favourable; certain French critics saw the English Pre-Raphaelite trend as somewhat eccentric.

== Legacy ==
Art historian Albert Boime wrote: "The Salon des Refusés introduced the democratic concept of a multi-style system (much like a multi-party system) subject to the review of the general jury of the public."

== See also ==
- Salon
- French art salons and academies
- Société des Artistes Indépendants
- Unjuried

== Sources ==
- Brombert, Beth Archer (1996). Édouard Manet: Rebel in a Frock Coat. Boston: Little, Brown.
- Hauptman, William (March 1985). "Juries, Protests, and Counter-Exhibitions Before 1850." The Art Bulletin 67 (1): 97-107.
- Mainardi, Patricia (1987). Art and Politics of the Second Empire: The Universal Expositions of 1855 and 1867. New Haven: Yale U Pr.
- Albert Boime, "The Salon des Refuses and the Evolution of Modern Art," Art Quarterly 32 (Winter 1969): 411-26
- Fae Brauer, Rivals and Conspirators: The Paris Salons and the Modern Art Centre, Newcastle upon Tyne, Cambridge Scholars, 2013.
