= Symphony in White, No. 3 =

Painting by James McNeill Whistler

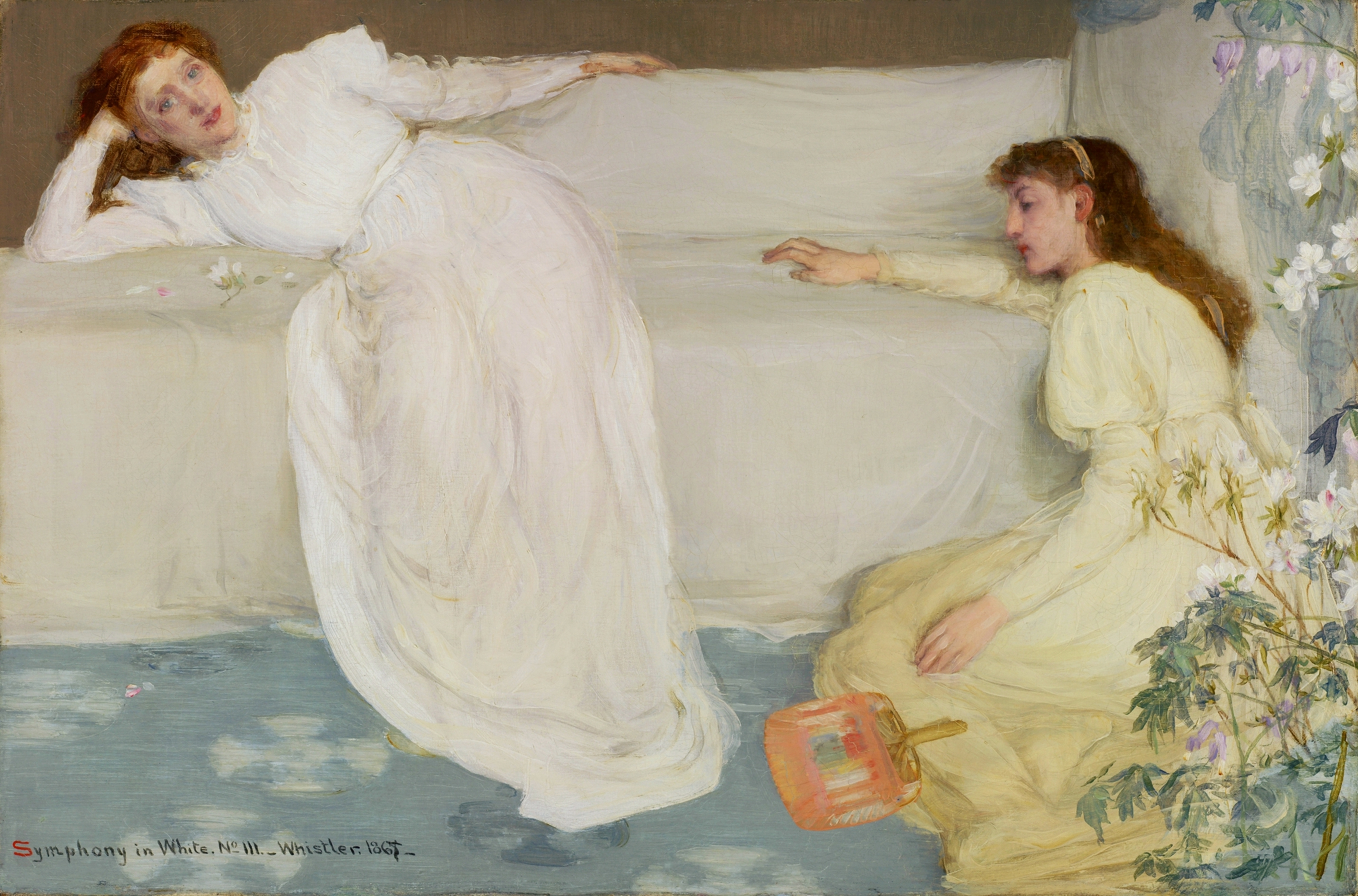
- Artist: James McNeill Whistler
- Year: 1865–67
- Medium: Oil on canvas
- Dimensions: 51.4 cm × 76.9 cm (20.2 in × 30.3 in)
- Location: Barber Institute of Fine Arts; Birmingham

Symphony in White, No. 3, is a painting by James McNeill Whistler. The work shows two women, one sitting on a sofa dressed in white, and the other resting on the floor, with a yellowish dress. The model on the sofa is Joanna Heffernan, the artist's mistress. By calling the painting Symphony in White, No. 3, Whistler intended to emphasize his artistic philosophy of corresponding arts, inspired by the poet Charles Baudelaire. The presence of a fan on the floor shows the influence of Japonisme, which was a popular artistic trend in European art at the time. Whistler was also greatly influenced by his colleague and friend Albert Joseph Moore, and their works show considerable similarities.

Though Whistler started on the painting in 1865, he was not ready to exhibit it publicly until 1867, when it went on display at the Royal Academy. His colleagues were impressed by the painting, but not all critics fully understood the connection between the painting and its title. One review in particular questioned the presence of other colours in addition to white, a criticism which prompted Whistler to respond with a scathing and sarcastic letter. Years later, Whistler's former student Walter Sickert criticized the painting as "the low-water mark of the old manner, before the birth of the new."

== Background ==
James McNeill Whistler was born in the United States in 1834, the son of George Washington Whistler, a railway engineer. In 1843, his father relocated the family to Saint Petersburg, Russia, where James received training in painting. After a stay in England, he returned to America to attend the US Military Academy at West Point in 1851. In 1855, he made his way back to Europe, determined to dedicate himself to painting. Here he settled in Paris at first, but in 1859 moved to London, where he would spend most of the remainder of his life. There he met Dante Gabriel Rossetti and other members of the Pre-Raphaelite Brotherhood, who would have a profound influence on Whistler.

It was also in London that Whistler met Joanna Heffernan, the model who would become his lover. By 1865, Whistler had already used her as a model for other paintings, among these Symphony in White, No. 1 and Symphony in White, No. 2. Heffernan supposedly had a strong influence over Whistler; his brother-in-law Francis Seymour Haden refused a dinner invitation in the winter of 1863–64 due to her dominant presence in the household. In January 1864, Whistler's mother Anna – later depicted in the painting Arrangement in Grey and Black – arrived to stay with her son in London. As a result, Heffernan had to move out of the apartment, and only visited as a model. Still, Heffernan's presence displeased Whistler's mother, and his relationship with both women became strained.

== Creation and reception ==
Whistler started on Symphony in White, No. 3 perhaps as early as July 1865. It was the last of his paintings for which Heffernan was a model. He used Milly Jones, the wife of an actor friend, as the second model for the painting. By the middle of August, he had a complete sketch ready, and he continued work on the painting into September. Whistler kept reworking it, however, and it was not until 1867 that he considered it finished. He painted over the final "5" in the date, and replaced it with a "7", to mark the changes it had undergone. In March 1867, William Michael Rossetti wrote of seeing the painting in Whistler's studio, and mentioned that it was previously called The Two Little White Girls. It then went on display at the Royal Academy.

The work was greatly admired by Whistler's colleagues, including Henri Fantin-Latour, Alfred Stevens, James Tissot and Edgar Degas. For Degas, the painting served as an inspiration for his own portrait of Eugénie Fiocre in the ballet La Source. Some critics, however, were confused by the title. Philip Hamerton, writing for the Saturday Review on 1 June 1867, remarked:

In the "Symphony in White No. III." by Mr. Whistler there are many dainty varieties of tint, but it is not precisely a symphony in white. One lady has a yellowish dress and brown hair and a bit of blue ribbon, the other has a red fan, and there are flowers and green leaves. There is a girl in white on a white sofa, but even this girl has reddish hair; and of course there is the flesh colour of the complexions.

Whistler was always belligerent in his response to critics. He wrote a letter to the editor that the newspaper would not print, but was later reprinted by Whistler himself in his book The Gentle Art of Making Enemies:

How pleasing that such profound prattle should inevitably find its place in print!...Bon Dieu! did this wise person expect white hair and chalked faces ? And does he then, in his astounding consequence, believe that a symphony in F contains no other note, but shall be a continued repetition of F, F, F ? . . . Fool!

The painting was originally bought by the wealthy art collector Louis Huth, who later also commissioned Whistler to paint a portrait of his wife. It is in the ownership of the Barber Institute of Fine Arts, in Birmingham, England.

== Composition and interpretation ==
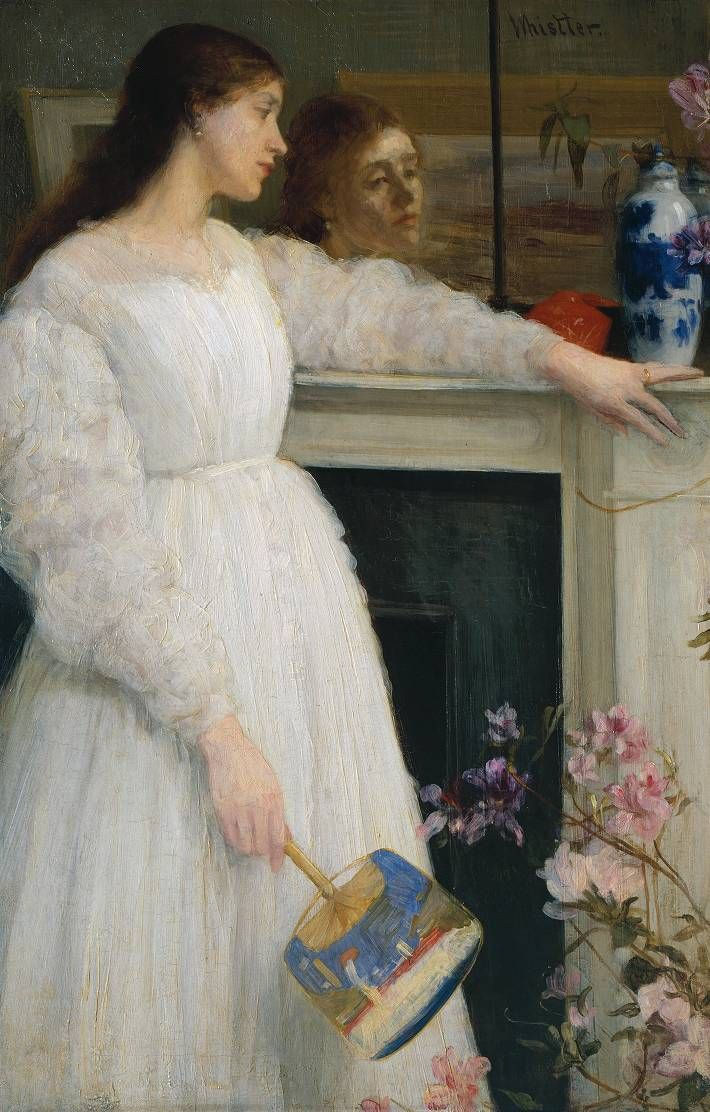
Women dressed in white was a theme Whistler had previously employed in his Symphony in White, No. 1 and Symphony in White, No. 2.

Symphony in White, No. 3 shows Heffernan reclining on a sofa with her head rested on her hand, while Jones is seated on the floor, leaning against the sofa. There is a fan on the floor, and a plant bearing white flowers on the right. The fan is an oriental element, and an expression of the artistic trend known as Japonisme which was then prevalent in European art. At the time, Whistler was greatly influenced by his friend and colleague Albert Joseph Moore. The painting bears close resemblances to Moore's roughly contemporary painting A Musician, though at the time the two were working so closely together that it is hard to ascertain exactly who influenced whom.

The painter Walter Sickert – a student of Whistler – later described the painting in unflattering terms. In December 1908, five years after Whistler's death, he wrote in the Fortnightly Review:

In 'Symphony in White, No. 3,' we get the culbute. A bad picture, lâchons le mot, badly composed, badly drawn, badly painted, the low-water mark of the old manner, before the birth of the new. Folds of drapery are expressed by ribbons of paint in the direction of the folds themselves, with hard edges to them. Only painters can quite understand the depth of technical infamy confessed in this last description. It means that the drapery is no longer painted, but intended.

To Whistler himself, however, the painting was not old-fashioned, but rather an expression of something new and innovative. By naming it Symphony in White, No. 3, Whistler highlighted his emphasis on composition, rather than subject matter. The use of a musical title was also an expression of the theory of corresponding arts, which was an idea developed by the French poet Charles Baudelaire. These tendencies became more and more dominant in Whistler's art over time. His two earlier paintings Symphony in White, No. 1 and Symphony in White, No. 2 had originally been titled The White Girl and The Little White Girl respectively, and later been renamed by the artist. Whistler had originally intended to call this work Two Little White Girls, but the development of his artistic philosophy made him change his mind, and from the time of its first exhibition it has been called by its musical title.

== See also ==
- List of paintings by James McNeill Whistler

== Sources ==
- Craven, Wayne (2003). American Art: History and Culture. New York: McGraw-Hill. ISBN 0-07-141524-6.
- MacDonald, Margaret F. (1999). "Whistler, James (Abbott) McNeill". Grove Art Online. Oxford: Oxford University Press.
- Reff, Theodore (1977). "Degas: A Master among Masters". The Metropolitan Museum of Art Bulletin. 34 (4): 2–48. doi:10.2307/3258697. JSTOR 3258697.
- Sickert, Walter (2002) [1908]. Anna Gruetzner Robins (ed.). Walter Sickert: The Complete Writings on Art. Oxford: Oxford University Press. ISBN 0-19-926169-5.
- Spencer, Robin (1998). "Whistler's 'The White Girl': Painting, Poetry and Meaning". The Burlington Magazine. 140 (1142): 300–311. JSTOR 887886.
- Spencer, Robin (2004). "Whistler, James Abbott McNeill". Oxford Dictionary of National Biography (online ed.). Oxford University Press. doi:10.1093/ref:odnb/36855. (Subscription, Wikipedia Library access or UK public library membership required.)
- Taylor, Hilary (1978). James McNeill Whistler. London: Studio Vista. ISBN 0-289-70836-2.
- Whistler, James McNeill (1890). The Gentle Art of Making Enemies. William Heinemann.
