= Le Sommeil =

1866 painting by Gustave Courbet

The Sleepers
- Le Sommeil (French)
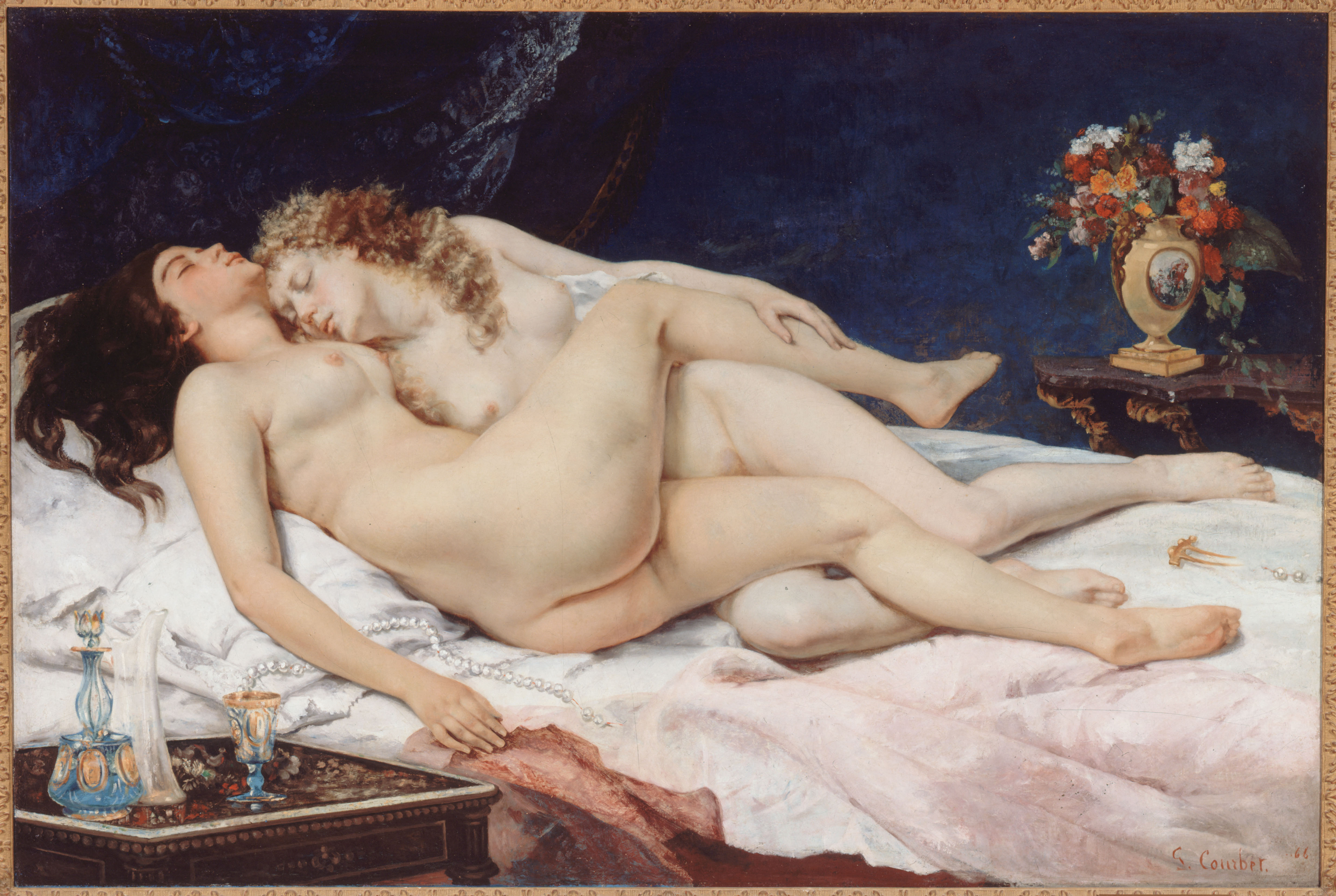
- Artist: Gustave Courbet
- Year: 1866
- Medium: Oil on canvas
- Dimensions: 135 cm × 200 cm (53 in × 79 in)
- Location: Petit Palais, Paris

Le Sommeil (translated in English variously as The Sleepers and Sleep) is an erotic oil painting on canvas by French artist Gustave Courbet created in 1866. The painting, which depicts a female couple, is also known as The Two Friends (Les Deux Amies) and Indolence and Lust (Paresse et Luxure).

== History ==
Le Sommeil was originally commissioned by the Turkish diplomat and art collector of the late Ottoman era, Halil Şerif Paşa, who had lived in Paris since 1860. The painting was not permitted to be shown publicly until 1988, like a number of Courbet's other works such as L'Origine du monde. When Le Sommeil was exhibited by a picture dealer in 1872, it became the subject of a police report. One of the models for the painting was Joanna Hiffernan, who was the mistress of fellow painter James Abbott Whistler at the time. Whistler's relationship with Hiffernan ended soon afterwards, and his opinion of Courbet soured.

The Encyclopedia of Lesbian and Gay Histories and Cultures describes Le Sommeil as a "famous" painting. The painting created an impact in 19th-century art, because after the public display of Le Sommeil, a number of contemporary artists were influenced by the theme of lesbian couples. Repetition of this theme helped to lower the taboos associated with lesbian relationships.

In 1955, Bernard Buffet painted his version of Le Sommeil as a tribute to Courbet.

Today Le Sommeil is in the collection of the Petit Palais, a Parisian museum.

== Description ==
The painting shows two naked women lying asleep on a bed entwined in an erotic embrace.

The setting is a bedroom with various textiles and ornamental furnishing. In the background there is a dark blue velvet curtain and in the right corner a table with a decorative flower vase. In the foreground is a small wooden table holding three items – a colored flacon (a small vessel), a transparent crystal vase, and a cup. Except for these few furnishings, there is nothing in the painting to overshadow the main image – the women.

One of the sleeping women is a redhead, the other is a brunette. For color contrast, Courbet worked curves between the women. A broken pearl necklace and a hairpin scattered in the bed reference the nature of their previous activity.

== Analysis ==
The painting was inspired by Charles Baudelaire's poem "Delphine et Hippolyte", from his collection Les Fleurs du mal. Le Sommeil has been interpreted as a realist painting, detailing the bodies without glossing over their imperfections.
