= Symphony in White, No. 2: The Little White Girl =

Painting by James McNeill Whistler

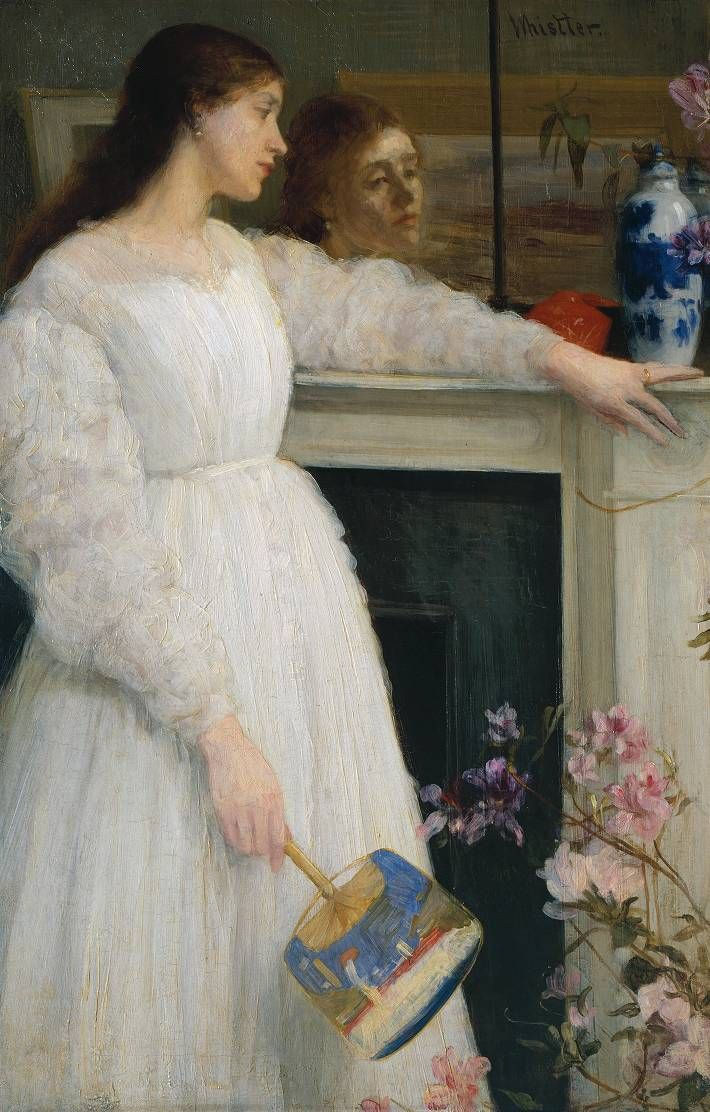
- Artist: James McNeill Whistler
- Year: 1864–65
- Medium: Oil on canvas
- Dimensions: 76 cm × 51 cm (30 in × 20 in)
- Location: Tate Britain, London

Symphony in White, No. 2, also known as The Little White Girl, is a painting by James McNeill Whistler. The work shows a woman in three-quarter figure standing by a fireplace with a mirror over it. She is holding a fan in her hand, and wearing a white dress. The model is Joanna Heffernan, the artist's mistress. Though the painting was originally called The Little White Girl, Whistler later started calling it Symphony in White, No. 2. By referring to his work in such abstract terms, he intended to emphasize his "art for art's sake" philosophy. In this painting, Heffernan wears a ring on her ring finger, even though the two were not married. By this religious imagery, Whistler emphasizes the aesthetic philosophy behind his work.

Whistler created the painting in the winter of 1864, and it was displayed at the Royal Academy the next year. The original frame carried a poem written by Whistler's friend Algernon Charles Swinburne – titled "Before the Mirror" – written on sheets of golden paper. The poem was inspired by the painting, a form known as ekphrastic poetry, and to Whistler this demonstrated that the visual arts need not be subservient to literature. Though there are few clues to the meaning and symbolism of the painting, critics have found allusions to the work of Ingres, as well as oriental elements typical of the popular Japonisme.

== Artist and model ==
James Abbott McNeill Whistler was born in the United States in 1834, the son of George Washington Whistler, a railway engineer. In 1843, his father relocated the family to Saint Petersburg, Russia, where James received training in painting. After a stay in England, he returned to America to attend the US Military Academy at West Point in 1851. In 1855, he made his way back to Europe, determined to dedicate himself to painting. He settled in Paris at first, but in 1859 moved to London, where he would spend most of the remainder of his life. There he met Dante Gabriel Rossetti and other members of the Pre-Raphaelite Brotherhood, who would have a profound influence on Whistler.

It was also in London that Whistler met Joanna Hiffernan, the model who would become his lover. Their relationship has been referred to as a "marriage without benefit of clergy." By 1861, Whistler had already used her as a model for other paintings. In Wapping, painted between 1860 and 1864, Hiffernan (according to Whistler) portrayed a prostitute. The direct precursor of The Little White Girl was a painting created in the winter of 1861–62, initially called The White Girl and later renamed Symphony in White, No. 1. Hiffernan supposedly had a strong influence over Whistler; his brother-in-law Francis Seymour Haden refused a dinner invitation in the winter of 1863–64 due to her dominant presence in the household.

== History of the painting and Swinburne's poem ==
Whistler painted The Little White Girl in 1864, with Hiffernan as his model. In 1865 it was exhibited at the summer exhibition of the Royal Academy; Whistler had offered The White Girl for the 1862 exhibition, but it had been rejected. English critics were not too impressed by the painting; one in particular called it "bizarre", while another called it "generally grimy grey". In 1900, however, it was one of the pictures Whistler submitted to the Universal Exhibition in Paris, where he won a grand prix for paintings. The first owner of the painting was the wallpaper manufacturer John Gerald Potter, a friend and patron of Whistler. In 1893 it came into the possession of Arthur Studd, who gave it to the National Gallery in 1919. In 1951 it was transferred to the Tate Gallery.

In 1862 Whistler had met the English poet Algernon Charles Swinburne, with whom he developed a close friendship. The relationship between the two was mutually beneficial. Inspired by Whistler's Little White Girl, Swinburne wrote a poem with the title "Before the Mirror". Before the painting went on exhibition at the Royal Academy, Whistler pasted the poem written on gold leaf onto the frame. The idea of decorating a painting's frame with a poem was one Whistler had gotten from Rossetti, who had similarly pasted a golden paper with one of his poems on the frame of his 1849 painting The Girlhood of Mary. To Whistler, this poem underlined his idea of the autonomous nature of the painted medium. It showed that painters were more than mere illustrators, and that visual art could be an inspiration for poetry, not just the other way around.

A misconception circulated at the time that the painting had been inspired by Swinburne's poem. In a letter to a newspaper, Whistler refuted this, while still showing his respect for Swinburne's work; "those lines" he wrote "were only written, in my studio, after the picture was painted. And the writing of them was a rare and graceful tribute from the poet to the painter – a noble recognition of work by the production of a nobler one." Swinburne repaid the compliment: "...whatever merit my song may have, it is not so complete in beauty, in tenderness and significance, in exquisite execution and delicate strength, as Whistler's picture..."

== Composition and interpretation ==
Whistler, especially in his later career, resented the idea that his paintings should have any meaning beyond what could be seen on the canvas. He is known as a central proponent of the "art for art's sake" philosophy. The development of this philosophy he owed largely to Swinburne, who pioneered it in his 1868 book William Blake: a Critical Essay. Later, Whistler began referring to The Little White Girl as Symphony in White, No. 2. By the musical analogy, he further emphasized his philosophy that the composition was the central thing, not the subject matter.

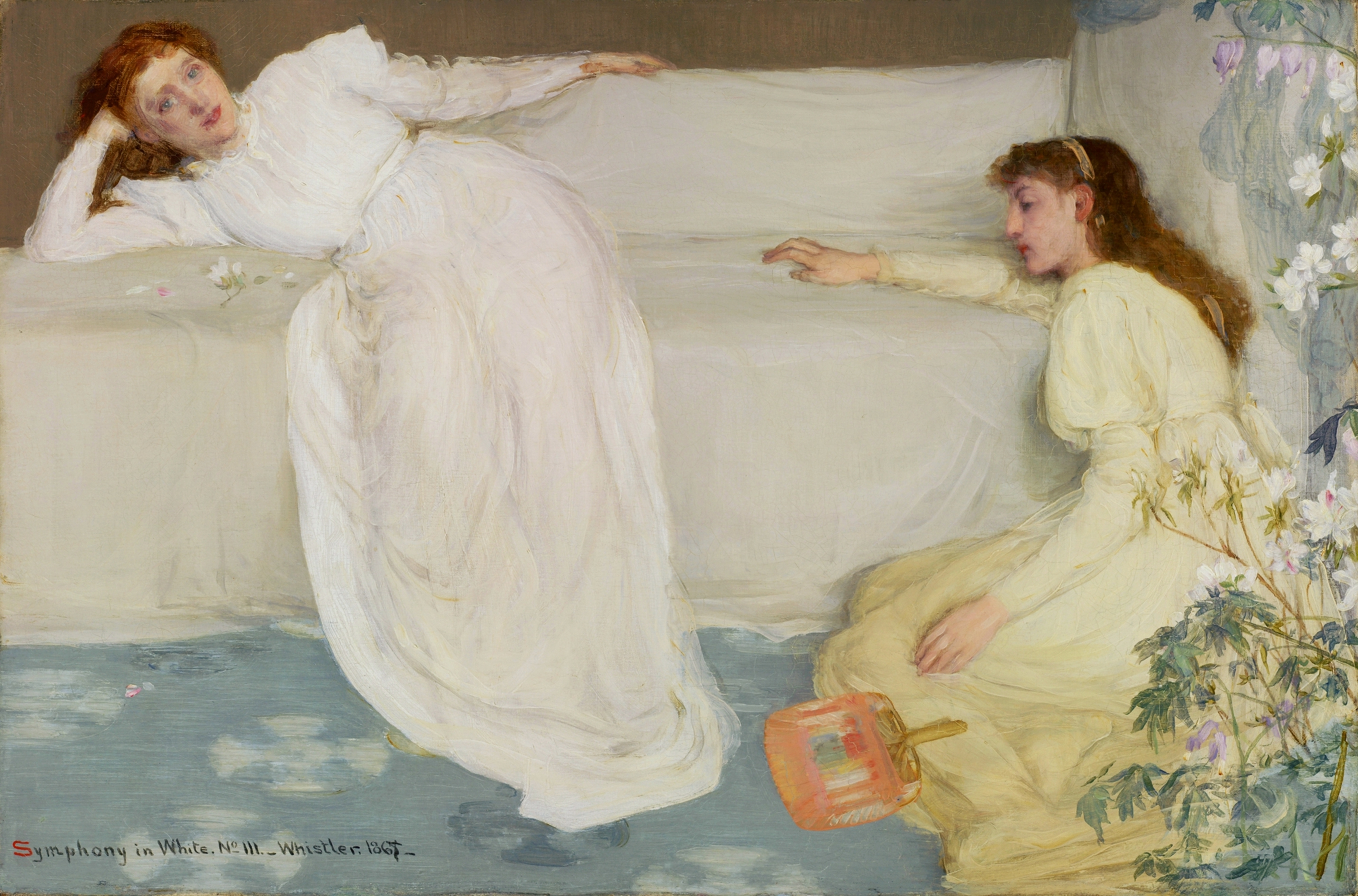
Women dressed in white was a theme Whistler had treated in his Symphony in White, No. 1, and would return to in Symphony in White, No. 3.

One of the most conspicuous elements of the painting is the ring on the model's ring finger. Resting on the mantelpiece, it becomes a focal point of the composition. The ring was a device of which Whistler was conscious; it had not been present in The White Girl. Though he and Hiffernan were not married, the ring showed a development in how he represented her in his art; from prostitute in Wapping, to mistress in The White Girl, and finally a wife in The Little White Girl. At the same time, this development reflected Whistler's notion of his own position in the English art world: towards greater legitimacy. The ring is also an allusion to the Christian sacrament of marriage, which lends a religious aspect to the aestheticism that he and Swinburne were trying to develop.

In The Little White Girl, Whistler can be seen to clearly move away from the realism of the French painter Gustave Courbet, who had previously been a great influence on him. The painting contrasts soft, round figures with harder geometrical shapes, using "brushy, transparent touches and dense, vigorous strokes." Various artists and styles have been suggested as inspirations for The Little White Girl. The painting has been compared to the work of Ingres. Though Whistler's painting was different from Ingres' art in many ways, he was nevertheless an admirer of the French artist, and was inspired by his work. The fan in the model's hand and the vase on the mantelpiece are oriental elements, and expressions of the Japonisme prevalent in European art at the time. Apart from this, there are few clues for the viewer, and the picture invites a wide variety of individual interpretations. A contemporary review in the newspaper The Times commented that "Thought and passion are under the surface of the plain features, giving them an undefinable attraction." Art critic Hilton Kramer sees in Whistler's portraits a charm and a combination of craft and observational skills that his more radical landscapes lacked.

== See also ==
- List of paintings by James McNeill Whistler

== Sources ==
- Anderson, Ronald; Koval, Anne (1994). James McNeill Whistler: Beyond the Myth. London: John Murray. ISBN 0-7195-5027-0.
- Batchelor, Bob (2002). The 1900s. Westport, Conn.; London: Greenwood Press. ISBN 0-313-31334-2.
- Craven, Wayne (2003). American Art: History and Culture. New York: McGraw-Hill. ISBN 0-07-141524-6.
- Horowitz, Ira M. (1979–1980). "Whistler's Frames". Art Journal. 39 (2): 125. doi:10.1080/00043249.1980.10793557. JSTOR 776398.
- Kramer, Hilton; Kimball, Roger (1974). The Age of the Avant-Garde: An Art Chronicle of 1956-1972. London: Secker and Warburg. pp. 72–3. ISBN 0-436-23685-0.
- MacDonald, Margaret F. (1999). "Whistler, James (Abbott) McNeill". Grove Art Online. Oxford: Oxford University Press.
- Merrill, Linda (1994). "Whistler and the 'Lange Lijzen'". The Burlington Magazine. Vol. 136. p. 687. JSTOR 886200.
- Prettejohn, Elizabeth (1999). After the Pre-Raphaelites: Art and Aestheticism in Victorian England. Manchester: McGraw-Manchester University Press. ISBN 0-7190-5405-2.
- Spencer, Robin (1998). "Whistler's 'The White Girl': Painting, Poetry and Meaning". The Burlington Magazine. Vol. 140. JSTOR 887886.
- Spencer, Robin (2004). "Whistler, James Abbott McNeill". Oxford Dictionary of National Biography (online ed.). Oxford University Press. doi:10.1093/ref:odnb/36855. (Subscription, Wikipedia Library access or UK public library membership required.)
- Sutton, Denys (1960). "A Whistler Exhibition". The Burlington Magazine. Vol. 102. pp. 460–1. JSTOR 873234.
- Taylor, Hilary (1978). James McNeill Whistler. London: Studio Vista. ISBN 0-289-70836-2.
- Weintraub, Stanley (1974). Whistler: A biography. London: Collins. ISBN 0-00-211994-3.
