= Jo, the Beautiful Irishwoman =

Series of four portraits in oil on canvas by Gustav Courbet

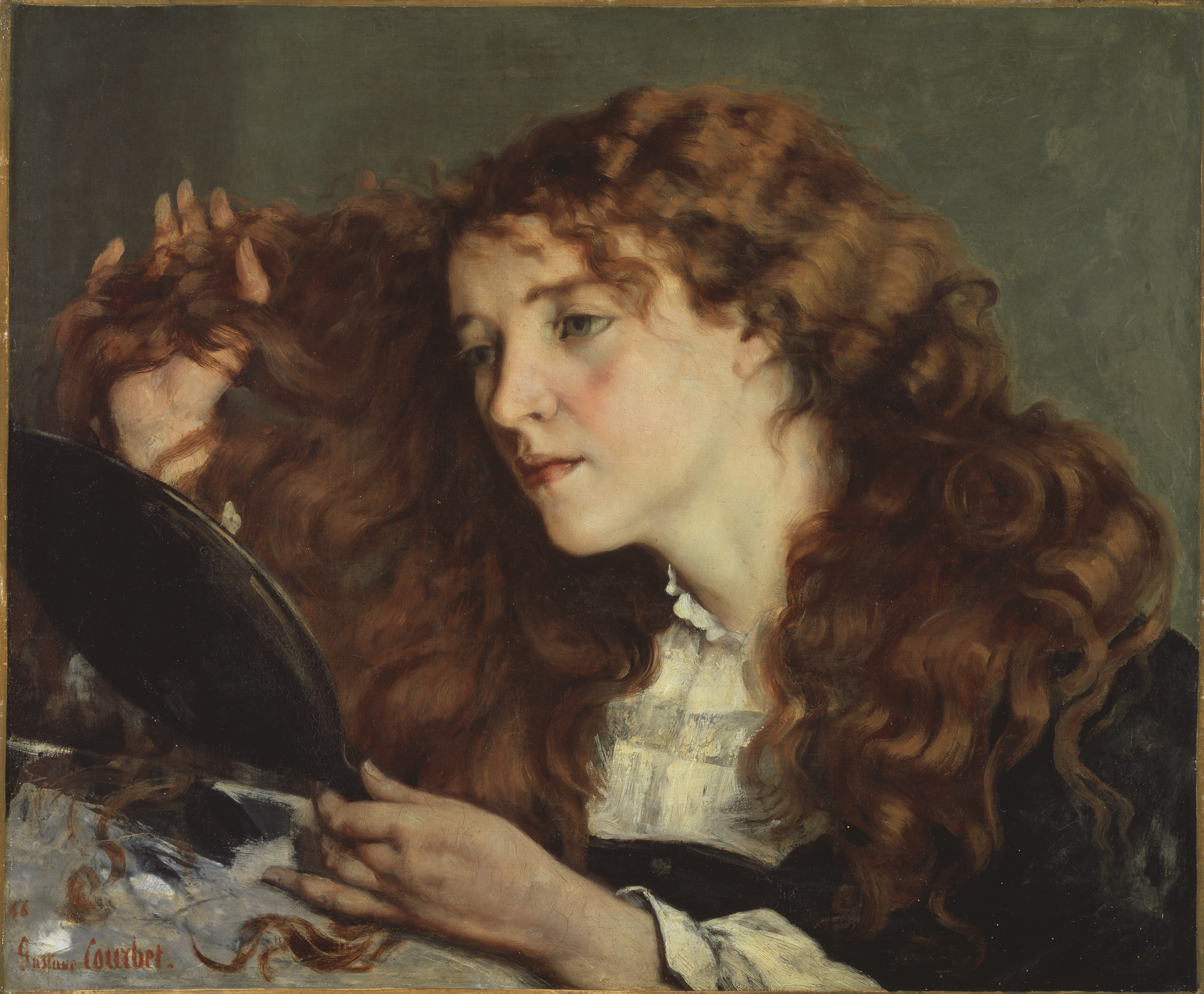
Stockholm version

Jo, the Beautiful Irishwoman (French: Jo, la belle irlandaise) is the title of a series of four oil on canvas bust-length portraits by Gustave Courbet. They all show the same redheaded Irish model Joanna Hiffernan (c.1843 – c.1905) looking in a mirror – she also modelled for Whistler. The works have minor differences in details and dimensions but their exact chronology is unknown. They are now in the Nationalmuseum, the Metropolitan Museum of Art, the Nelson-Atkins Museum of Art and a private collection.

== History ==
The nickname in the title indicates the friendship between the artist and his model and is unusual for contemporary portraits of women in that it gives the model's first name. They were probably painted in Trouville, where the painter spent August to November 1865 painting seascapes with Whistler and Joanna. On 17 November, towards the end of his stay, he wrote to his parents that he "bore himself admirably" and told them that he was Whistler's "pupil". Whistler himself painted the portrait Courbet by the River or My Dear Courbet during the latter's stay with him.

Courbet had already painted a series of paintings of women looking in mirrors in 1860 - this had been quite successful with the public and was exhibited in Brussels. The best known from that series, Woman with a Mirror, was painted in Ornans in winter 1859–1860 and is now in the Kunstmuseum Basel – it shows a brunette with a mirror (almost identical to that in Jo) and a prominent décolletage.

== Four versions ==
| Image | Dimensions (cm) | Collection | City | Catalogue no. | Previous collection/sale |
|---|---|---|---|---|---|
| | 55,9 × 66 | Metropolitan Museum of Art | New York | 29.100.63 | H. O. Havemeyer collection (1929) |
| | 54 × 65 | Nationalmuseum | Stockholm | NM 2543 | Entered the collection in 1926 |
| | 54,31 × 63,5 | Nelson-Atkins Museum of Art | Kansas City | 32-30 | Scott and Fowles sale, New York (1932) |
| | Unknown | Private Collection | Zürich | Unknown | Rolf & Margit Weinberg sale, Sotheby's New York (May 1998) |
