= Jules-Antoine Castagnary =

French art critic (1830–1888)

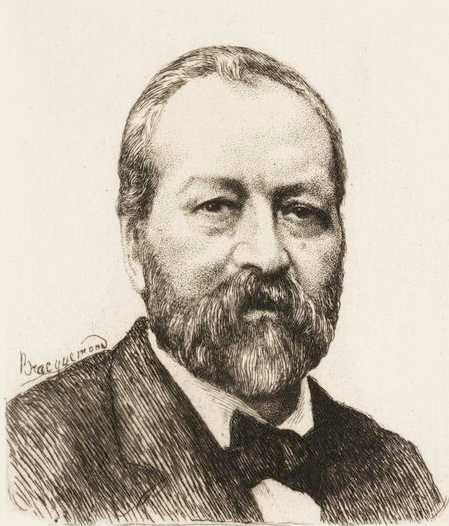
Portrait of Castagnary, etching by Félix Bracquemond

Jules-Antoine Castagnary (11 April 1830 – 11 May 1888) was a French liberal politician, journalist and progressive and influential art critic, who embraced the new term "Impressionist" in his positive and perceptive review of the first Impressionist show, in Le Siècle, 29 April 1874.

Born at Saintes, Charente-Maritime, in the west of France, Castagnary lived in Paris, where he contributed to Le Monde illustré, Le Siècle and Le Nain jaune, a political journal of Liberal tendencies. He reviewed the annual Paris Salons from 1857 to 1879. He organized the provincial Republican press at the time of the Siege of Paris (1870–71). After the collapse of the French Second Empire, Castagnary, who was an anti-clerical republican, developed a secondary political career. He became a member of the municipal council of Paris (1874), was the director of the École nationale supérieure des Beaux-Arts (1887), and sat on the Conseil d'État (1879) and the Comité des monuments historiques. He was appointed to a ministerial post in the short-lived Léon Gambetta cabinet in 1881, but resigned when that ministry fell 1 January 1882.

His portrait by his intimate friend Gustave Courbet (1870), whose art Castagnary championed from the first and whose radical role during the Paris Commune Castagnary defended after Courbet's death, is now in the Musée d'Orsay, Paris. The correspondence between the two men is a fundamental document in analyzing Courbet's life and output.

At the time of his death in Paris, Castagnary was engaged in a full-length biography of Courbet, left incomplete; he is buried in the Cimetière de Montmartre, Paris.

== Selected works ==
- Philosophie du salon de 1857, 1858
- Les Artistes au XIX^{e} siècle : Salon de 1861, 1861
- Grand Album des Expositions de peinture et de sculpture. 69 tableaux et statues, 1863
- Les Libres Propos, 1864
- Le Bilan de l'année 1868, politique, littéraire, dramatique, artistique et scientifique, (contributor with Paschal Grousset, Arthur Ranc and Francisque Sarcey), 1869
- Les Jésuites devant la loi française, 1877
- Exposition des œuvres de G. Courbet à l'École des Beaux-Arts en mai 1882, (exhibition catalogue), 1882. Curated and edited by Castagnary.
- Gustave Courbet et la colonne Vendôme : plaidoyer pour un ami mort, 1883
- Salons (1857-1879), 2 vols, 1892
