= Joanna Hiffernan =

Irish artists' model and muse

James Abbott McNeill Whistler, Symphony in White, No. 1: The White Girl (1862), National Gallery of Art, Washington, D.C. Hiffernan is the subject of this portrait.

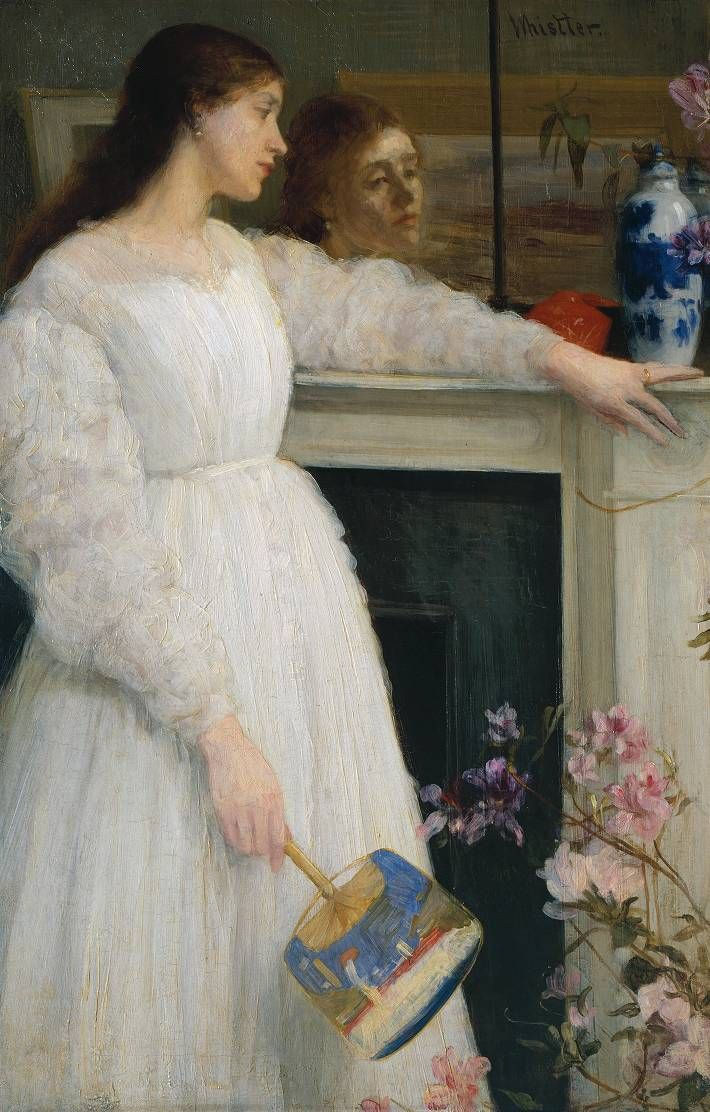
Symphony in White, No. 2: The Little White Girl, (1864–65), Tate Britain

Joanna Hiffernan (1843 – 3 July 1886) or Joanna Heffernan was an Irish artists' model and muse who was romantically linked with American painter James Abbott McNeill Whistler and French painter Gustave Courbet. In addition to being an artists' model, Hiffernan herself also drew and painted, although it is not believed she ever exhibited her work.

== Early life ==
Hiffernan was a Roman Catholic, born in Limerick in Ireland in 1843 to Anne née Hickey and Patrick Hiffernan. She and her family may have left Ireland for London during the Great Famine of 1845 to 1848, taking up residence at 69 Newman Street. The spelling errors in her surviving letters suggest she received a modest education. Her father, Patrick Hiffernan, was described by Whistler's friends, Joseph Pennell and his wife Elizabeth, as being like "Captain Costigan", the drunken Irishman in Thackeray's novel Pendennis. The Pennells also described him as "a teacher of polite chirography calligraphy" who used to speak of Whistler as "me son-in-law". Her mother died in 1862, aged 44. Joanna Hiffernan had a sister called Bridget Agnes Hiffernan, later Singleton. The artist Walter Greaves, who began tuition with Whistler in 1863, and who knew Hiffernan well, said that she had a son called Harry but no trace of him can be found in official records.

She dressed strikingly at Whistler's expense, with George du Maurier scornfully commenting that "Jo came with [Whistler] to me ... got up like a duchess, without crinoline – the mere making up of her bonnet by Madame somebody or other in Paris had cost 50 fr."

== Artist's model ==
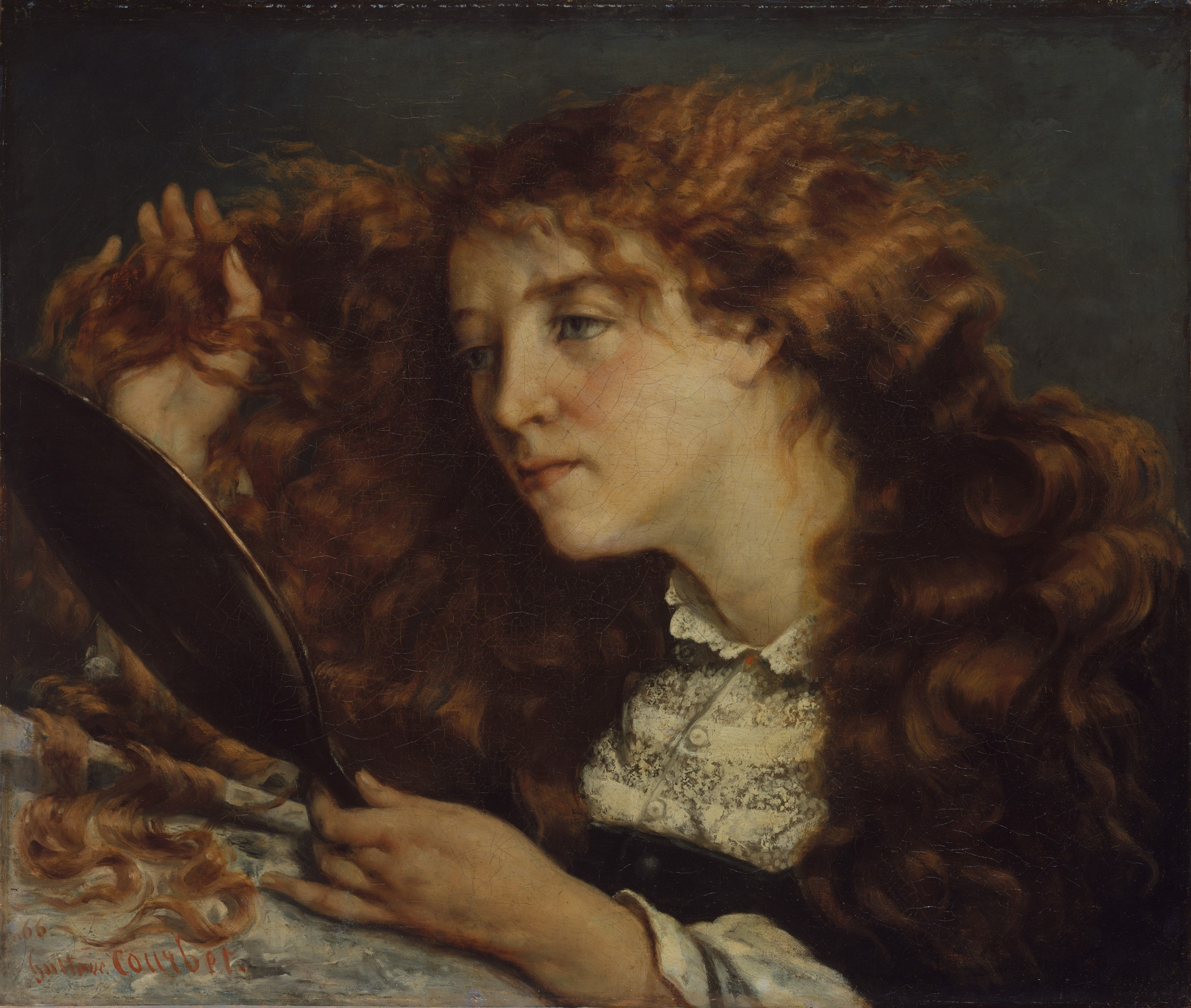
Gustave Courbet, La belle Irlandaise (Portrait of Jo) 1865–1866, Metropolitan Museum of Art, a painting of Joanna Hiffernan

Whistler first met the 17-year-old Jo Hiffernan in 1860 while she was at a studio in Rathbone Place, and in about 1861 began a six-year relationship with her, during which period she modelled for some of his most famous paintings. Physically striking, Hiffernan's was also personable. Whistler's biographers and friends, the Pennells, wrote of her, "She was not only beautiful. She was intelligent, she was sympathetic. She gave Whistler the constant companionship he could not do without."

Whistler's family did not approve of Hiffernan. Unmarried artists' models, and especially those who posed nude, were considered at that time to be little better than prostitutes. However, Hiffernan seems to have modelled only for friends, so perhaps the objections to her made by Whistler's family were based more on social class than on Hifferman's personal character. When Whistler's mother visited from America in 1864, alternative accommodation had to be found for Hiffernan, who also seems to have been the cause of Whistler's quarrel with Alphonse Legros in 1863.

She was in France with Whistler during the summer of 1861, and while in Paris during the winter of 1861–62 she sat for Symphony in White, No. I: The White Girl at a studio in Boulevard des Batignolles, and in 1864–65 she posed for Symphony in White, No. 2: The Little White Girl. It is possible that this is when she met Whistler's friend and fellow artist, Gustave Courbet, for whom she later modelled. Although there are some that think Hiffernan was the model for Courbet's L'Origine du monde, which depicts a nude woman's vulva, the majority of expert opinion is that the model was Constance Quéniaux, a dancer and courtesan.

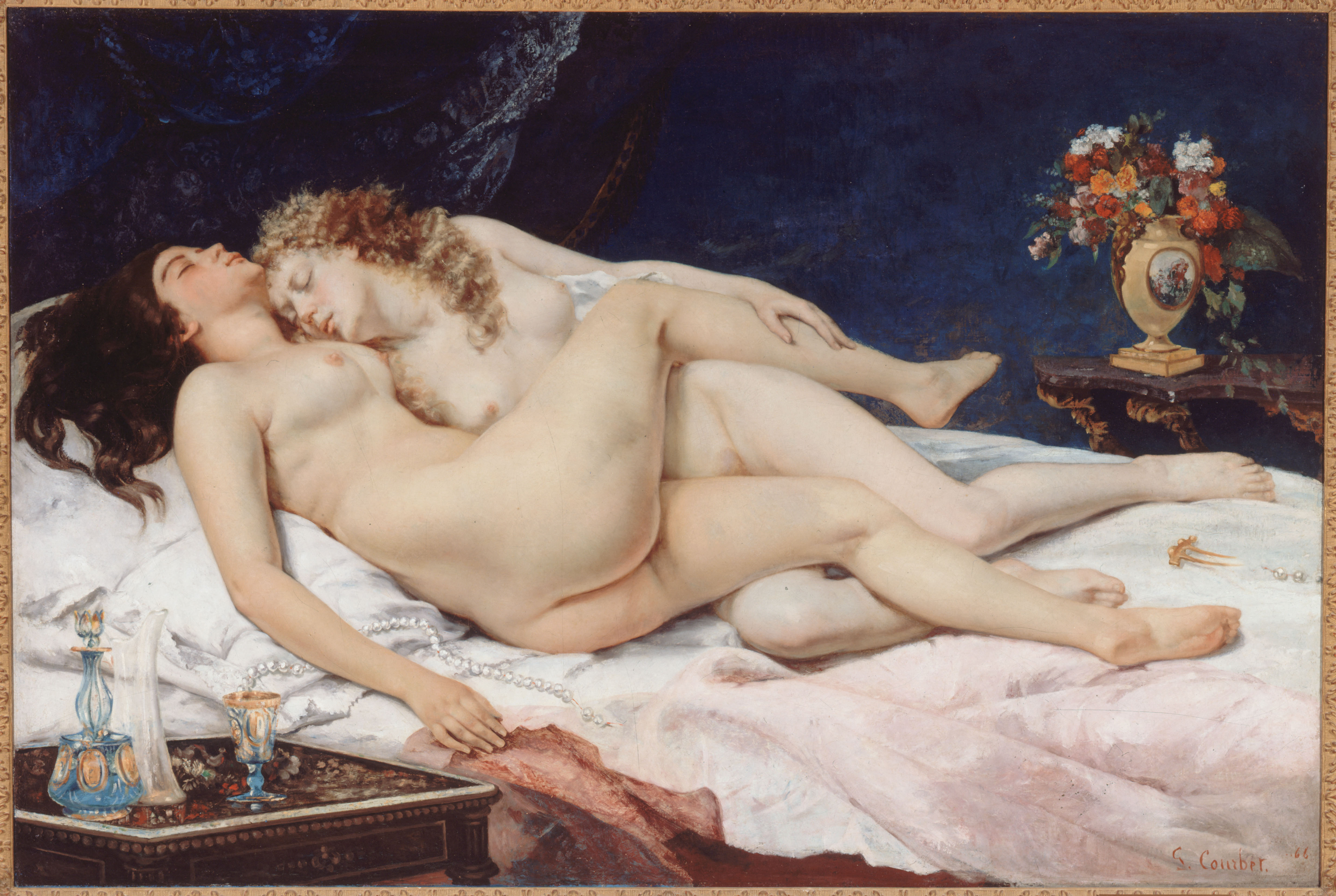
Gustave Courbet, Le Sommeil (Sleep), 1866, Petit Palais, Musée des Beaux-Arts de la Ville de Paris

Hiffernan attended séances with Whistler at Dante Gabriel Rossetti's house in Chelsea in 1863, and spent the summer and autumn of 1865 in Trouville with Whistler. In 1866 Whistler gave Hiffernan power of attorney over his affairs while he was in Valparaíso for seven months, making provision for household expenses and giving her the authority to act as an agent in the sale of his works. She called herself Mrs. Abbot, especially when selling Whistler's works around art dealers to raise money.

During Whistler's absence, Hiffernan travelled to Paris and posed for Courbet in Sleep (French: Le Sommeil), which depicts two naked women in bed asleep. It is likely that she had an affair with Courbet at this time. After the end of his relationship with Hiffernan, Whistler left a will in her favour.

== Later years ==
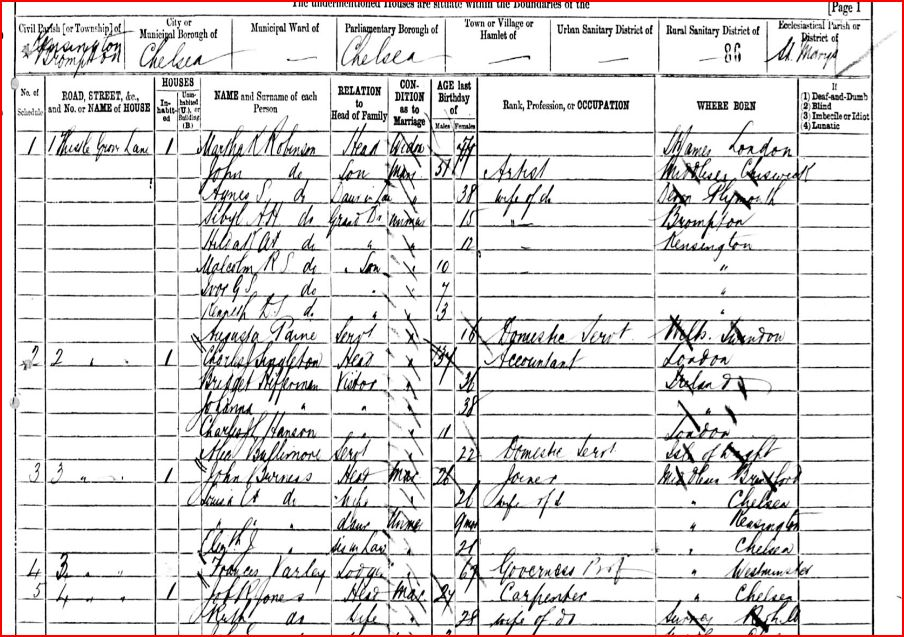
1881 Census sheet showing Hiffernan living at 2 Thistle Grove Lane

After she and Whistler parted, Hiffernan helped to raise Whistler's son, Charles James Whistler Hanson (1870–1935), the result of an affair with a parlour maid, Louisa Fanny Hanson. He lived with Hiffernan at 5 Thistle Grove as late as 1880 when Whistler was away in Venice with Maud Franklin, his then mistress. The 1881 English census recorded Hiffernan, her sister Bridget Agnes Hiffernan (1845–1921) and Charles Hanson as visitors of accountant Charles Singleton (whom Bridget would marry in 1901) at 2 Thistle Grove.

Little is known of Hiffernan after 1880. A woman reported to Juliette Courbet (1831–1915), the sister of Gustave Courbet, in a letter of 18 December 1882, that "the beautiful Irish girl" was in Nice, where she sold antiques and some pictures by Courbet. It is said that Hiffernan married a man named Abbot some time after 1881, possibly on the Continent, but this may be a misunderstanding due to Hiffernan's calling herself 'Mrs. Abbot' while selling Whistler's paintings to art dealers to raise funds during their relationship. Joanna died on 3 July 1886, at 2 Millman Street, Holborn. The most likely cause of death was respiratory failure.

The art collector Charles Lang Freer met Agnes Hiffernan when he was a pallbearer at Whistler's funeral in 1903 when she came forward in heavy mourning to pay her last respects. Thinking he had just met Joanna, Freer so informed his fellow art patron Louisine Havemeyer (1855–1929) who later recorded the incident as she heard it:

As she raised her veil and I saw ... the thick wavy hair, although it was streaked with grey, I knew at once it was Johanna, the Johanna of Etretat, 'la belle Irlandaise' that Courbet had painted with her wonderful hair and a mirror in her hand.... She stood for a long time beside the coffin—nearly an hour I should think.... I could not help being touched by the feeling she showed toward her old friend. "Did Maud [Franklin] come?" [Havemeyer] asked. "Yes" answered Mr. Freer, "the same afternoon. She had come all the way from Paris and was very much affected as I uncovered Whistler's face for her to see him." ... [One could see, Freer mused] "that the real drama of [Whistler's] life was bound up in the love of [these] devoted women.

== See also ==
- Symphony in White, No. 2: The Little White Girl
