= Francis Seymour Haden =

British artist (1818–1910)

Sir Francis Seymour Haden

Sir Francis Seymour Haden CMG FRCS PPRE (16 September 1818 – 1 June 1910), was an English surgeon, better known as a printmaker, mainly in etching, who championed original printmaking. He was at the heart of the Etching Revival in Britain, and one of the founders of the Society of Painter-Etchers, now the Royal Society of Painter-Printmakers, as its first president. He was also a collector and scholar of Rembrandt's prints.

== Life ==
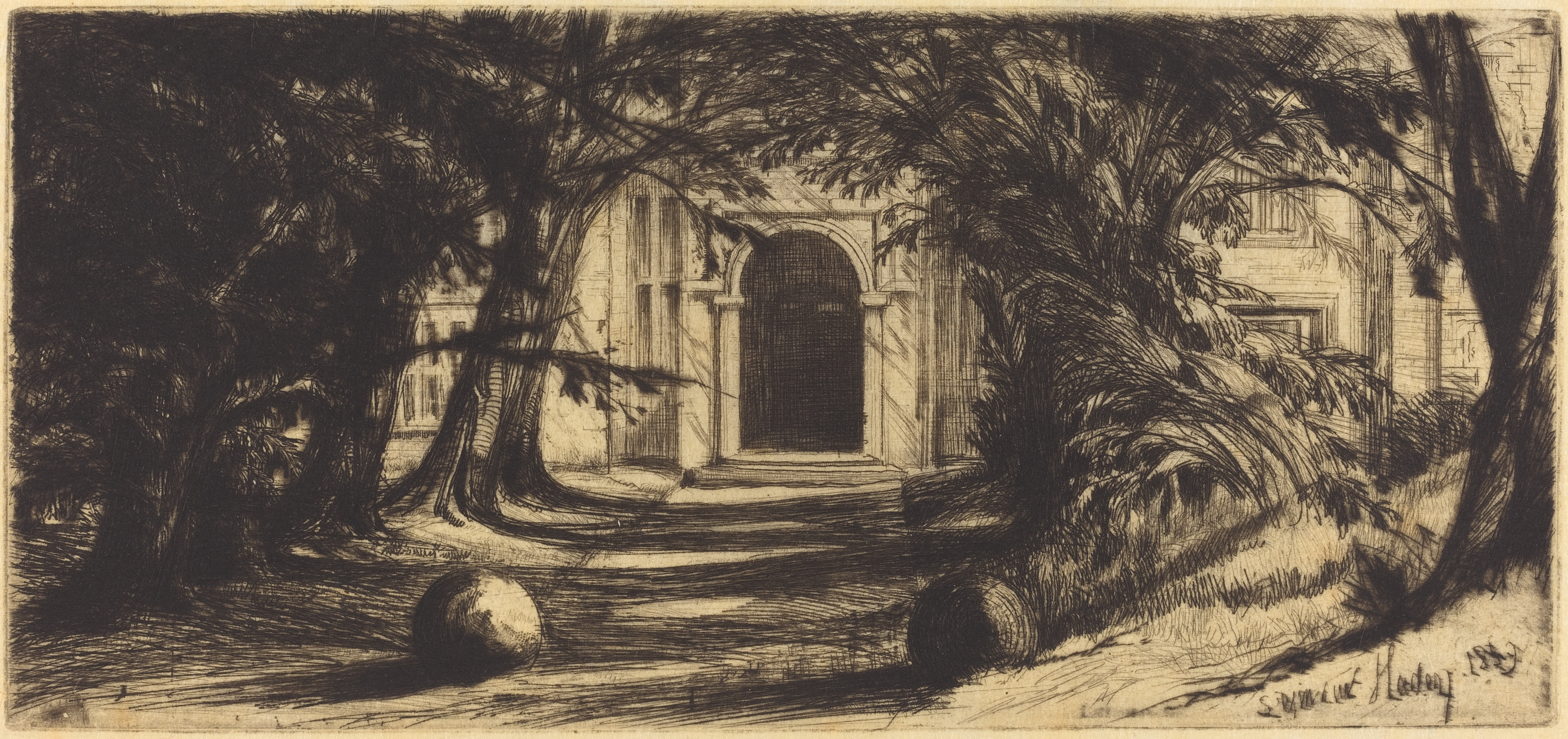
Mytton Hall, Lancashire, drypoint, 1859

Haden was born at 62 Lower Sloane Street, Chelsea, London. His father, Charles Thomas Haden, being a well-known doctor and lover of music. He was educated at Derby School, Christ's Hospital, and University College, London, and also studied at the Sorbonne, Paris, where he took his degree in 1840. He was admitted as a member of the College of Surgeons in London in 1842.

== Artistic career ==
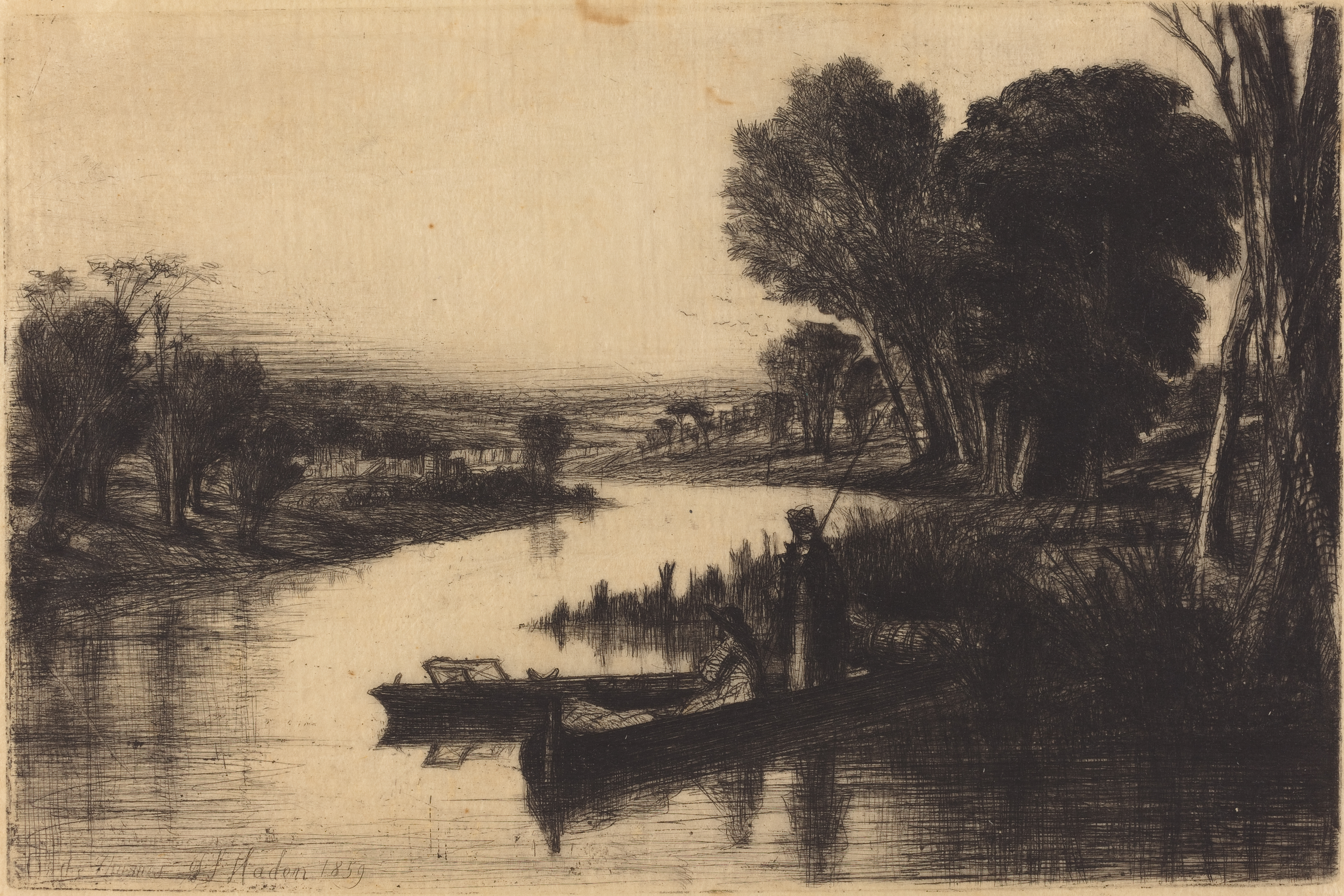
Thames Fishermen, drypoint with etching, 1859

In 1843–44, with his friends Duval, Le Cannes and Colonel Guibout, he travelled to Italy and made his first sketches and six etchings from nature. Haden attended no art school and had no art teachers, but between 1845 and 1848 he studied intently, the portfolios of prints belonging to a second-hand dealer named Love, who had a shop in Bunhill Row, the old Quaker quarter of London. Arranging the prints in chronological order, he studied in particular, the works of the great original engravers, Albrecht Dürer, Lucas van Leyden and Rembrandt.

As mentioned in "Print REbels" primarily celebrating the bicentenary of Haden: Exquisite line, especially drypoint burr, sometimes calligraphic in sensibility, can be seen across Haden's prints, the majority which are landscapes. Added to this is his range and intensity of expression. He expresses the maximum by means of the minimum to achieve the essence of his subject matter: what Haden himself called "the labour of omission". Haden's printmaking was mutually invigorated by his younger brother-in-law, James McNeill Whistler, at the Haden home in Lower Sloane Street in 1855. An etching press was installed there and for a while Haden and Whistler collaborated on a series of etchings of the Thames. However, the relationship and project did not last.

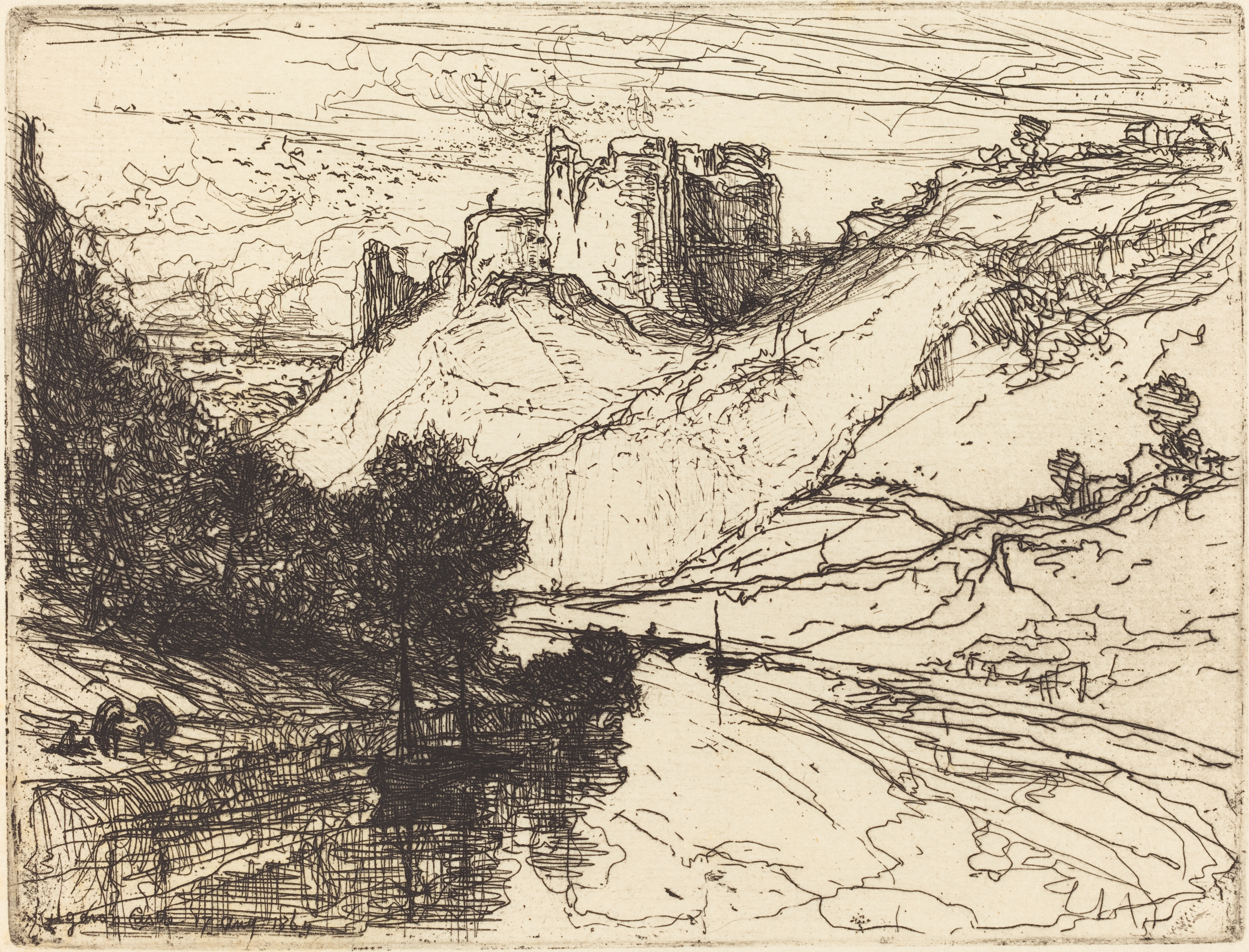
Kilgaren Castle, etching, 1864

Haden followed the art of original etching with such vigour that he became not only the foremost British exponent of that art from 1865 but brought about its revival in England. His strenuous efforts and perseverance, aided by the secretarial ability of Sir William R Drake RE, resulted in the foundation of the Royal Society of Painter-Etchers and Engravers, styled the Royal Society of Painter-Printmakers since 1990. As President Haden ruled the Society for thirty years with a strong hand from its first beginnings in 1880. "As PRE," Frederick Keppel, author and print collector wrote: "Sir Francis Seymour Haden did great work in maintaining sound doctrine in etching. Nothing was admitted that was "commercial" in character, and etchings that were done after paintings by other hands were vigorously ruled out." In fact, as regarding the RE Members, "he ruled them with a rod of iron," However, "membership was eagerly sought for – so much that many famous et hers weren't never elected though they thrived hard to be."

Notwithstanding Haden's study of the old masters of his art, Haden's own plates were very individual. He preferred to work directly onto the plate in front of the subject. Malcolm Salaman Hon RE wrote of Haden drawing from nature; "with that breadth, freedom, and spontaneity of effect, which, while suggesting a sketch, represented a true etcher's drawing". Even when working from a picture by another artist his personality dominates the plate, as for example in the large plate he etched after J. M. W. Turner's Calais Pier, which is a classical example of what interpretative work can do in black and white. Of his original plates, 263 in number, one of the most notable was the large Breaking up of the Agamemnon.

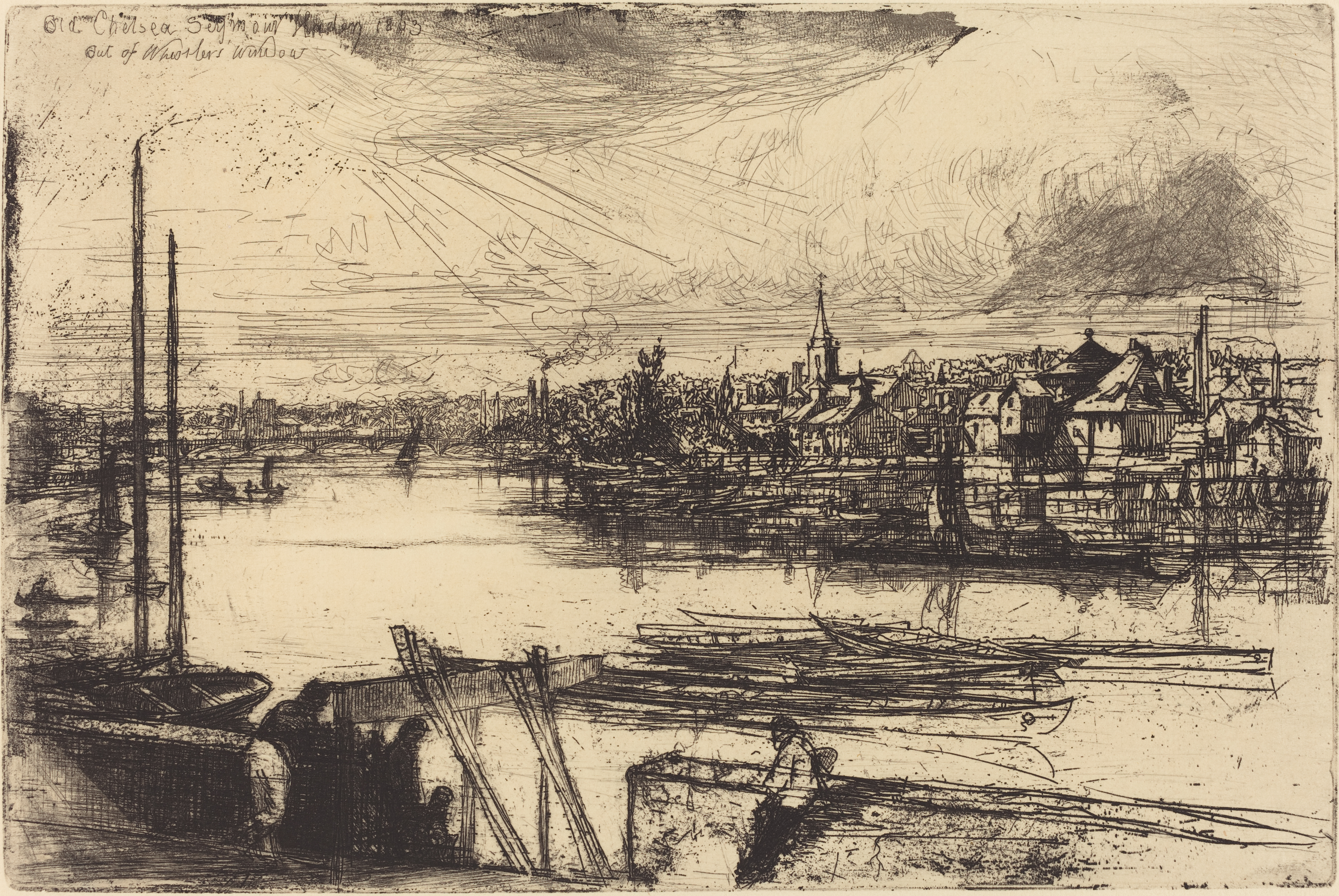
Old Chelsea, Out of Whistler's Window (Battersea Reach), etching with drypoint, 1863

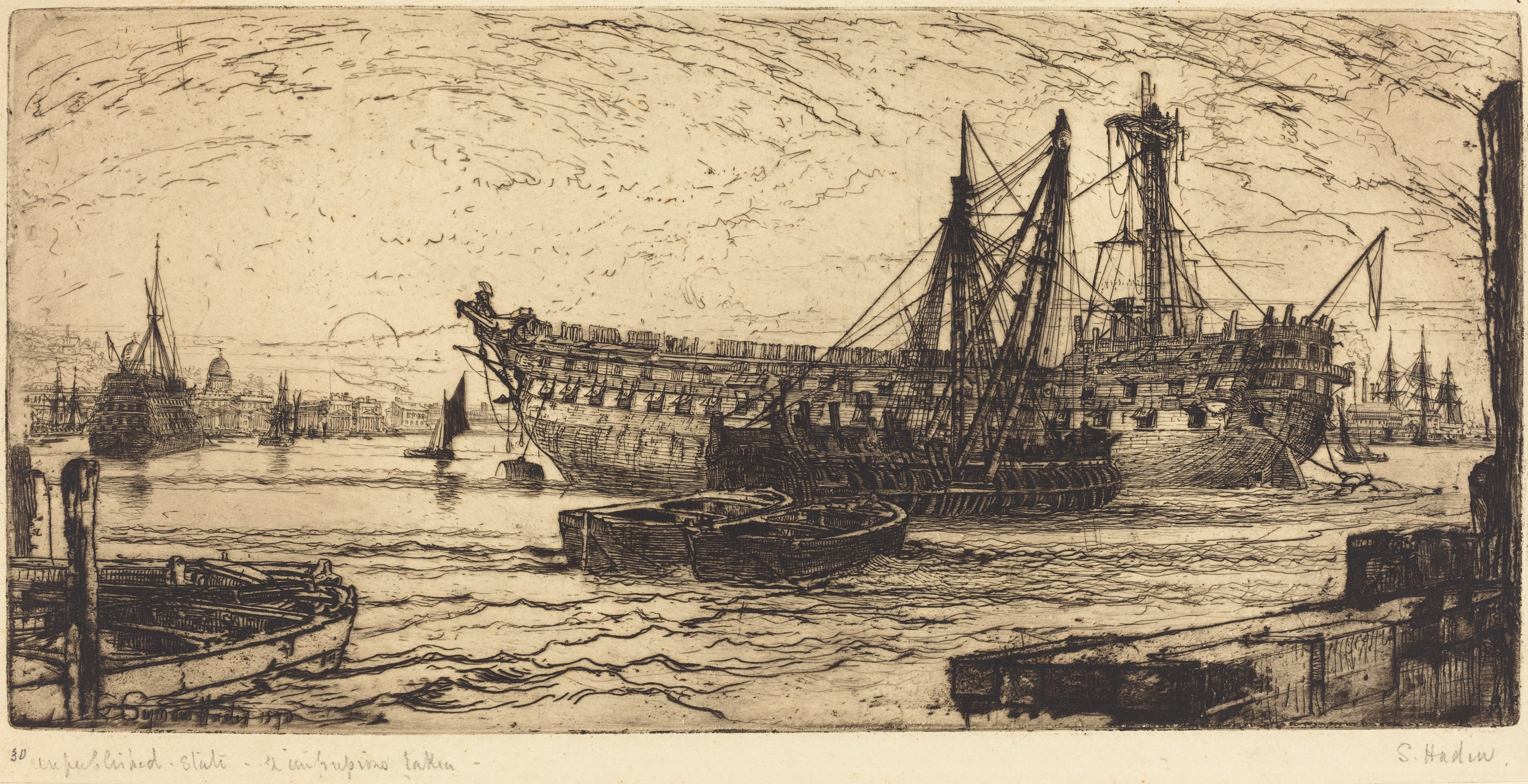
Breaking Up of the Agamemnon, etching,1870

An early plate, rare and most beautiful, is Thames Fisherman. Mytton Hall is broad in treatment, and a fine rendering of a shady avenue of yew trees leading to an old manor-house (now a hotel in Lancashire) in September sunlight. Sub Tegmine was etched in Greenwich Park in 1859; and Early Morning—Richmond, full of the poetry and freshness of the hour, was done, according to Haden, actually at sunrise.

Also mentioned in Print REbels: ‘Haden’s finest and rarest compositions were created along the River Muteen, by Greenpark in Dundrum, County Tipperary and at Glenmalure, County Wicklow. This surgeon-etcher visited Ireland four times between 1859 and 1864. Impressions of A River in Ireland, A Bye Road in Tipperary and Sunset in Ireland are hailed internationally amongst the finest landscape etchings of the 19th century. Kenneth Guichard writes in British Etchers 1850-1950, London, 1977:

"Sunset in Ireland must be one of the greatest prints ever produced in etching, one can feel the dew beginning at the end of a balmy evening in Tipperary.”

This is fortified in Raymond Lister and Robin Garton’s book, Great Images of Printmaking in 1978:

"1863 was a year for Haden in printmaking. Sunset in Ireland is one of the etchings of its period. It has the potency of ‘A River in Ireland’, but its textures are still richer, with their hint of that humid dusk often encountered in Ireland. There too, a note of mystery in the river as it curves into wooded reaches. In places the lines of shading seem almost careless, where much of the composition is cross-hatched by diagonal lines. The apparent carelessness is all part of Haden’s calculated and brilliant gift of suggestion. The plate was etched on the spot at Dundrum Park in Tipperary."

Other notable plates include are Combe Bottom, Shere Mill Pond (both the small study and the larger plate), The Towing Path, Kilgaren Castle, The Three Sisters, Battersea Reach – Out of Whistler's Window, Penton Hook, Grim Spain and Evening Fishing, Longparish. ‘Sunset in Ireland’ is Haden's acknowledged pastoral masterpiece. A catalogue of his works was begun by Sir William Drake and completed by Harrington in 1880. During later years also Haden began to practise mezzotint engraving, with a measure of the same success that he had already achieved in pure etching and in drypoint. His mezzotints include An Early Riser, a stag seen through the morning mists, Grayling Fishing and A Salmon Pool on the Spey. He also created paintings and charcoal drawings of trees and park-like country.

== Writings ==
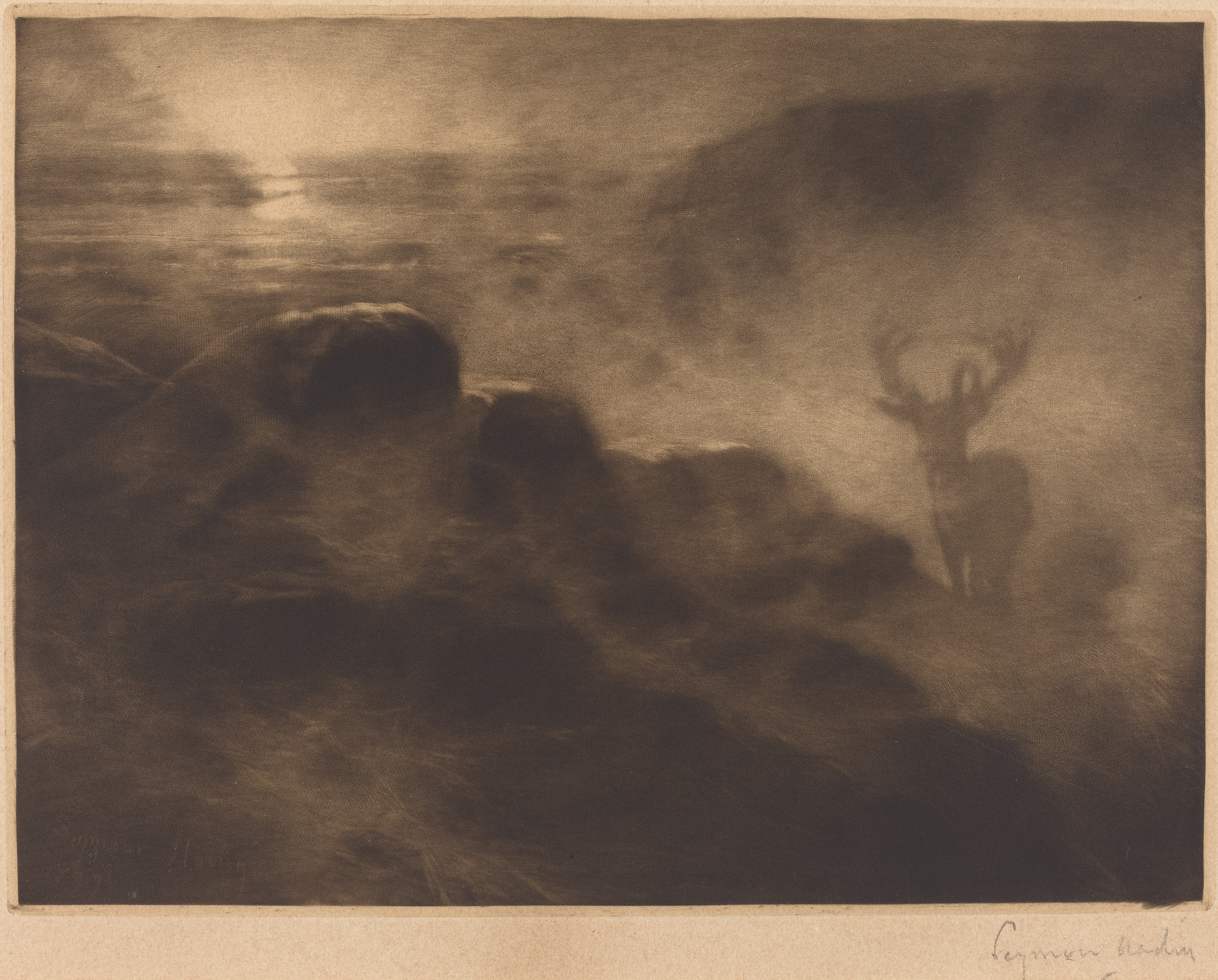
An Early Riser, mezzotint, 1897

Haden's studies of Rembrandt, besides influencing his original work, led to his important monograph on the Dutch artist's etchings. Haden was the first to catalogue Rembrandt's etchings chronologically and in "states". Through books and lectures, and with the aid of an exhibition at the Burlington Fine Arts Club in 1877, he tried to give a true reflection of Rembrandt's work, excluding from his oeuvre a large number of plates previously attributed to him. Haden's reasons were founded upon the results of a study of the master's works in chronological order, and are clearly expressed in his monograph, The Etched Work of Rembrandt critically reconsidered, privately printed in 1877, and in The Etched Work of Rembrandt: True and False (1895). 102 of Rembrandt's etchings from Haden's collection were exhibited alongside the RE Annual exhibition in 1890.

Other books written by Haden not already mentioned are:

- Etudes a l'eau forte (Paris, 1865)
- Cremation: a Pamphlet (London, 1875)
- About Etching (London, 1879)
- The Relative Claims of Etching and Engraving to rank as Fine Arts and to be represented in the Royal Academy (London, 1883)
- Address to Students of Winchester School of Art (Winchester, 1888)
- The Disposal of the Dead, a Plea for Legislation (London, 1888).
- The Art of the Painter-Etcher (London, 1890)

As the last two indicate, he was an ardent champion of a system of "earth to earth" burial. During the London 'Burial Crisis' of the late 1840s, following several epidemics, he aired a proposal to ship the bodies of London's dead to the Thames Estuary for use in land reclamation but this met with little approval.

== Honours and legacy ==
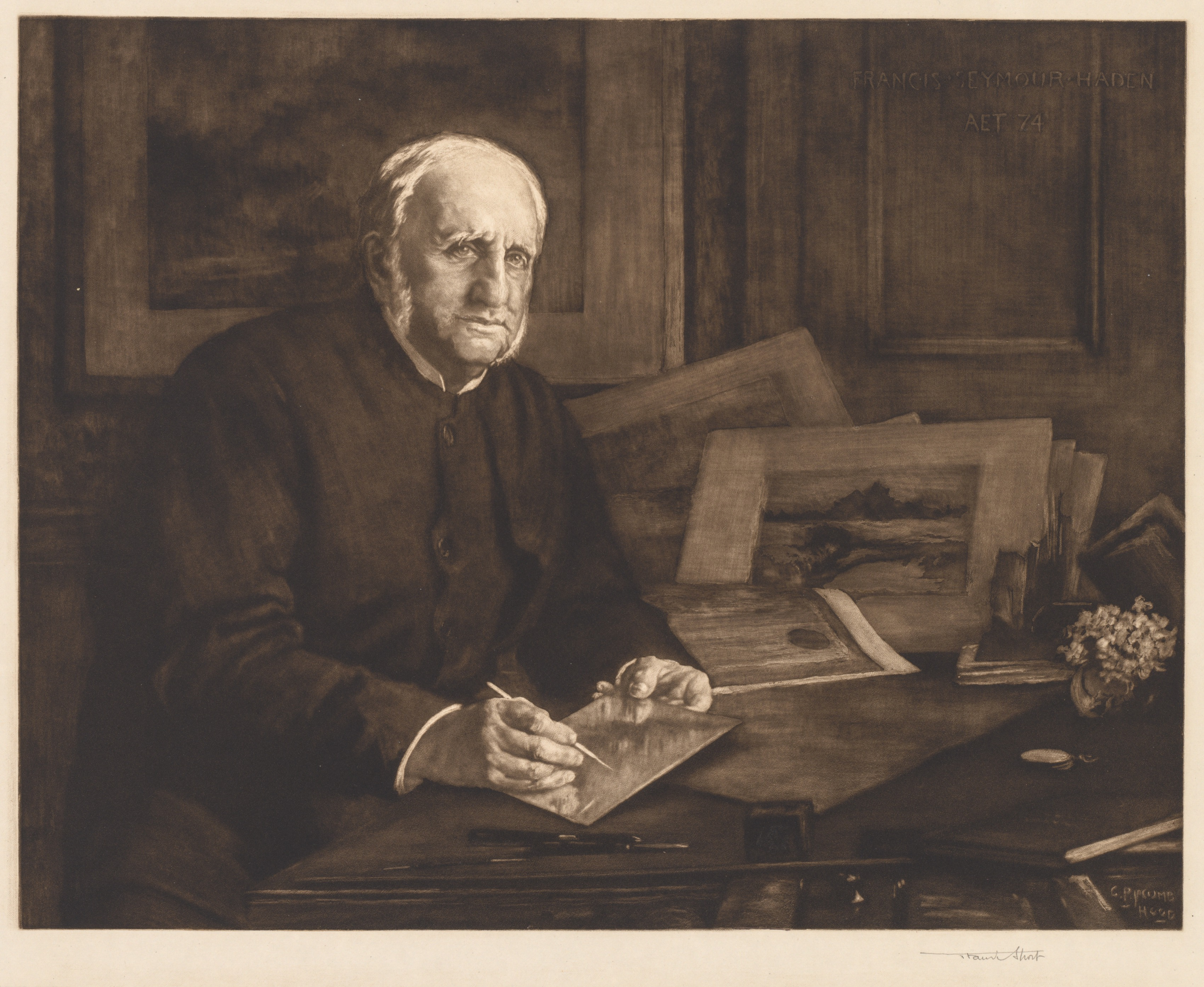
Mezzotint portrait, 1901, by George Percy Jacomb-Hood

Among numerous distinctions Haden received the Grand Prix, Paris, in 1889 and 1900, and was made an honorary member of the Institut de France, Académie des Beaux-Arts and Société des Artistes Français. Haden was knighted in 1894 for his services "to the advancement of original etching and engraving".

Print REbels, was an exhibition commemorating 200 years since the birth of Haden and celebrating the origins of the Royal Society of Painter-Printmakers, founded by Haden, was launched by the society at the Bankside Gallery, London. It toured UK museums and galleries at Cambridge, Cheltenham, Marlborough, Devon and Wales as well as Spain in 2018 and 2019. In July and August 2021 this exhibition travelled to Dublin, Republic of Ireland, at the Knight of Glin Exhibition Room, Assembly House, headquarters of the Irish Georgian Society. A 346 page catalogue/book, written by Edward Twohig RE and published by the Royal Society of Painter-Printmakers in April 2018, comprehensively mirrors Haden's achievements and influence. A limited edition "REbels Portfolio" by current Members of the Royal Society of Painter-Printmakers was created, also, in celebration. Box sets of this portfolio are in the permanent collection of the British Museum; Ashmolean Museum, Oxford; Fitzwilliam Museum, Cambridge and the Royal Collection.

== Family ==
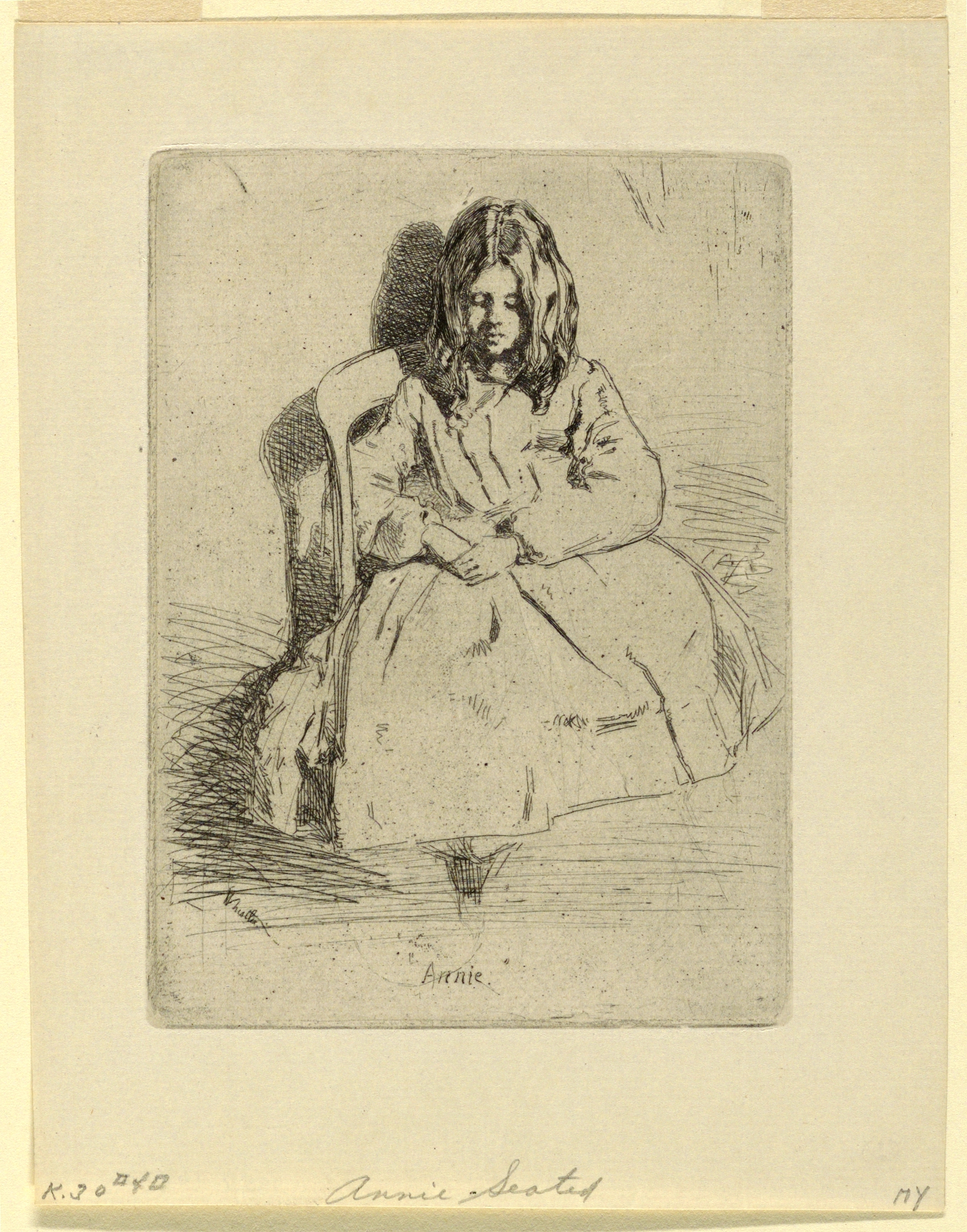
Haden's daughter, Annie, was painted by James Abbott McNeill Whistler

In 1847 he married the musician Dasha Whistler, the half-sister of the artist James McNeill Whistler (the siblings sharing the same father only); and his eldest son, Francis Seymour Haden (b. 1850), was educated at Marlborough College in Wiltshire and had a distinguished career as a member of the government in Natal Colony from 1881 to 1893, being made a C.M.G. in 1890. His daughter Anne was the mother of the mystery writer Molly Thynne.

== Bibliography ==
- A Catalogue Raisonné of the Prints of Sir Francis Seymour Haden by Dr Richard S. Schneiderman (1983) ISBN 978-0-9060-3016-5.
- 19 prints by Haden at the The ORCHAR Collection: Prints
- Lyandres, Emma (2022) Haden’s Études à L’eau Forte – The ORCHAR Collection: Prints
