= Halil Sherif Pasha =

Ottoman diplomat and art collector (1831–1879)

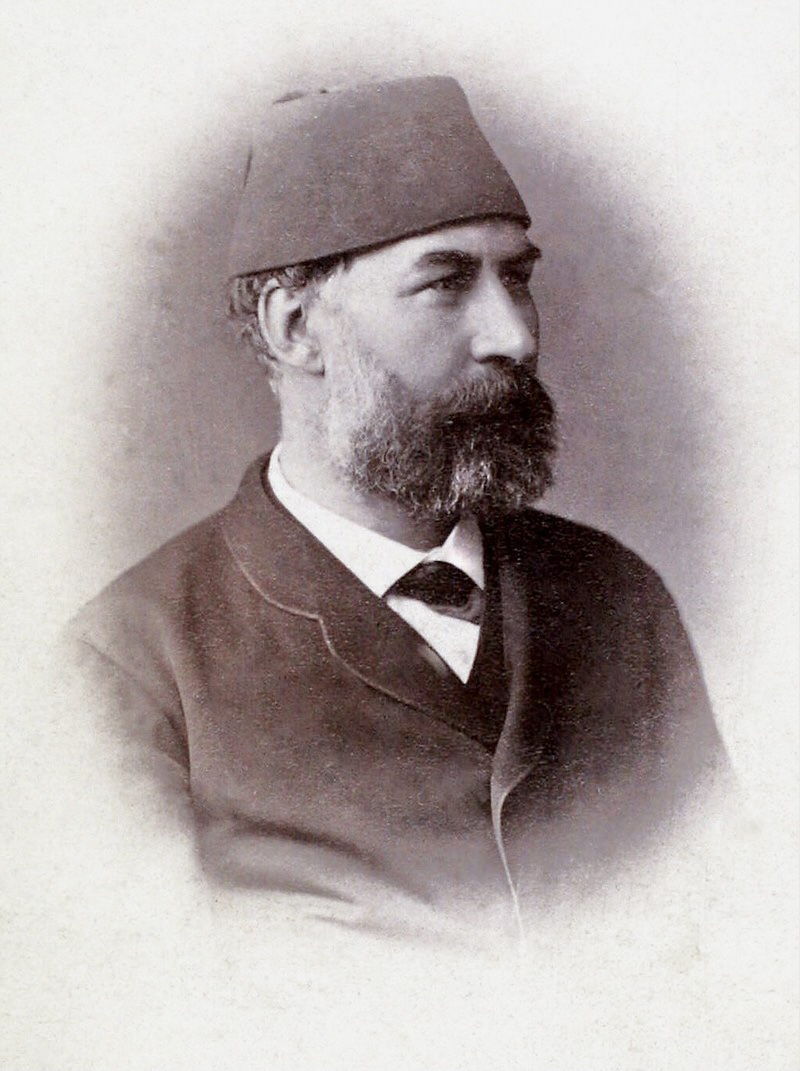

Personal details
- Born: 20 June 1831 Cairo, Egypt Eyalet, Ottoman Empire
- Died: 12 January 1879 (aged 47) Istanbul, Ottoman Empire
- Spouse(s): First wife Nazli Fazil
- Children: Leyla Hanım (I); Hayya Hanim (II)
- Parent: Muhammad Sharif Pasha al-Kabir (father)
- Relatives: Ali Pasha Sherif (brother)

Halil Sherif Pasha, transliterated variously as Halil Şerif Pasha (Albanian: Halil Sherif Pasha, 20 June 1831 – 12 January 1879), was an Ottoman-Egyptian statesman, diplomat and art collector, who lived during the Tanzimat period. His collection was described by Théophile Gautier as "the first ever to be formed by a child of Islam". He was furthermore involved in diplomatic affairs following the aftermath of the Crimean War. He also served as the Ottoman Minister of Foreign Affairs.

== Name ==
For most of his life, Halil was known by the name Halil Bey or Khalil Bey. "Bey" was not a surname but rather a courtesy title recognized and sanctioned by the Ottoman government to designate a man as being the son of a Pasha. Halil used the title "Bey" as part of his name because his father Muhammad Şerif had attained the rank of Pasha. On 10 August 1871, Halil Bey was raised to the rank of Mushir (Field Marshal) by Sultan Abdul Aziz (reigned 1861–1876). The rank of "Mushir" entitled Halil to use his father's name "Şerif", as well as the honorific title "Pasha", as parts of his name.

== Life ==
Of Turkish-Albanian origin, Halil was born in Cairo in the mansion of Muhammad Ali Pasha. Halil's father, Muhammad Şerif Pasha, of Albanian origin, (died 13 February 1865) had emigrated to Egypt from Kavala (in what is now northern Greece) to serve as a captain in Muhammad Ali's army, making a huge fortune in the process. Muhammad Şerif Pasha sent Halil, along with his brothers Ali Pasha Sherif (1834–1897) and Osman, to be educated at the École Militaire Égyptienne (Egyptian Military School), which Muhammad Ali Pasha had set up in Paris in 1844. Halil took up his first official post in 1855 as Commissioner to the International Exhibition in Paris that year. He entered the Ottoman diplomatic service in 1856, serving as one of the plenipotentiaries negotiating the end to the Crimean War, and then as ambassador to Athens and Saint Petersburg, on which posts he began collecting art. He grew to dislike the cold of Saint Petersburg and so retired in a private capacity to Paris in the mid-1860s, renting expensive rooms from the English collector Lord Hertford on Rue Taitbout and becoming a noted gambler, art collector and patron.

He was introduced to Gustave Courbet by Sainte-Beuve, and commissioned Le Sommeil (The Sleepers) and L'Origine du monde from him. The latter painting is likely to be of his then lover, Constance Quéniaux. He also acquired Le Bain turc (The Turkish Bath) from Ingres and other works by Delacroix, Troyon, Daubigny, Meissonier, Corot, Rousseau and Gérôme. Works known to have been owned by Halil Şerif Pasha include:

- Eugène Delacroix, The Murder of the Bishop of Liège (now in the Louvre, Paris)
- Eugène Delacroix, The Women of Algiers (one version is in the Louvre, Paris, but it is unclear if this is the one owned by Halil)
- Eugène Delacroix, Tasso in the Hospital of St Anna at Ferrara (Buhrle private collection, Zurich)
- Eugène Delacroix, Tam o' Shanter (after the poem by Robert Burns) (Castle Museum, Nottingham)
- Eugène Delacroix, Arab Cavalry Practising a Cavalry Charge (Fabre Museum, Montpellier)

In January 1868 he sold off his art collection just before leaving to become Ottoman ambassador to Vienna, thus getting out of Paris only two years before the Franco-Prussian War. After the Vienna posting, he moved to Istanbul and married Princess Nazli Fazl, the daughter of a prominent reformer of the time, Mustafa Fazl Pasha. In 1877, he returned to Paris as Ottoman ambassador for a few months, but was dismissed from his post in September of that year. Halil Şerif Pasha died in Istanbul on 12 January 1879. Some sources record his death as being due to heatstroke while seated on a horse during Abdul Hamid II's accession parade. However, the accession parade was in August 1876.

== Sources ==
- Francis Haskell, 'A Turk and His Pictures in Nineteenth-Century Paris', Oxford Art Journal, Vol. 5, No. 1, Patronage (1982), pp. 40–47
