= Nazli Fazil =

Egyptian noblewoman

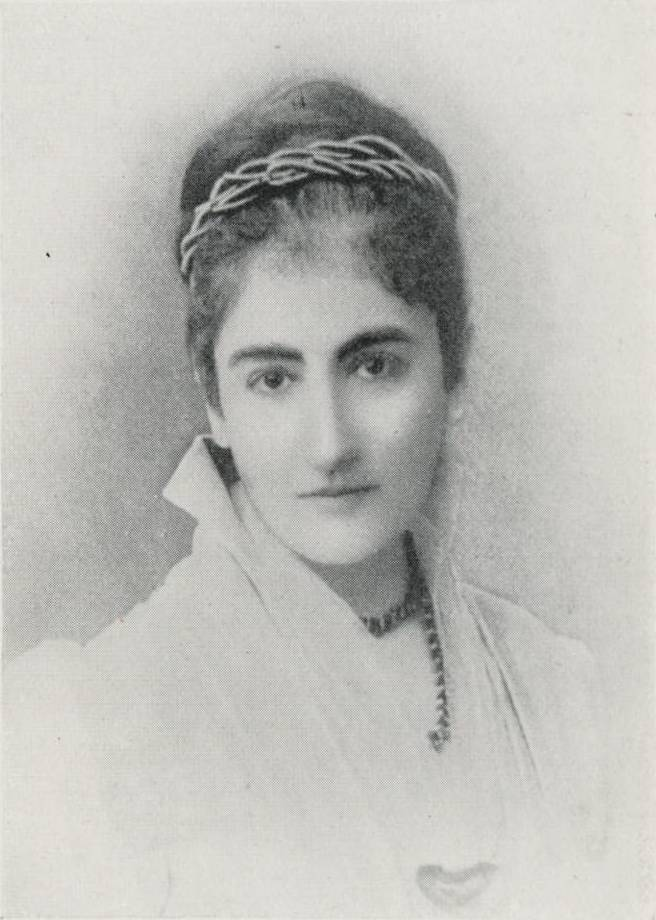
- Nazli Fazil by Gabriel Lekegian
- Born: 1853; Cairo, Khedivate of Egypt
- Died: 28 December 1913 (aged 59–60); Cairo, Khedivate of Egypt
- Burial: Mausoleum of Imam al-Shafi'i
- Spouse: Khalil Sherif Pasha (m. 1872; died 1879) Khelil Bouhageb (m. 1900)
- Issue: by Khalil Sherif; Hayya Hanim
- House: Muhammad Ali Dynasty
- Father: Mustafa Fazıl Pasha
- Mother: Dilazad Hanim

Nazli Zainab Hanim (Arabic: نازلی زینب هانم; 1853 – 28 December 1913) was an Egyptian princess from the dynasty of Muhammad Ali Pasha and one of the first women to revive the tradition of the literary salon in the Arab world, at her palace in Cairo from the 1880s until her death.

== Early life ==
Of Turkish origin, Princess Nazli Fazil was born in Cairo, in 1853, the eldest child of Mustafa Fazıl Pasha, son of Ibrahim Pasha of Egypt and brother of the future Khedive Isma'il Pasha, and his wife Dilazad Hanim (1837 – 1885), an Anatolian. At the age of 13, she left Egypt for Constantinople upon her father's falling out with his brother, the Khedive, in 1866. In Constantinople, she was highly educated, against prevailing tradition, and entertained foreign visitors. She was a well educated and cultured lady who spoke Turkish, Arabic, French and English.

== Personal life ==
In October 1872, she married one of her father’s cousins, Turkish ambassador Khalil Sherif Pasha. She moved to Cairo with him in 1875. Khalil became the Porte's ambassador to France, so she left Cairo once more and shared with her husband his voyages and displacements to several European capitals. Her political and social formation benefitted from his diplomatic experience. It was not a happy marriage, and her one daughter, Hayya Hanim, died in infancy. Upon his death in 1879, she moved back to Cairo, Khedivate of Egypt, and settled in a palace located nearby to the royal Abdeen Palace, named "Villa Henry" with her stepdaughter, Leila, a product of her husband’s first marriage.

Nazli went to Tunis for the first time in 1896 and for the second time in the beginning of 1899. Before embarking on this, her first trip to Tunis, Nazli contacted a Tunisian reformer living in Cairo, Mohamed Bayram V, who recommended that she look up some important families such as the Baccouche and the Sellami as well as the Prince Nasir Bey. The French authorities thought that she invented a family business as an excuse to travel and believed that the princess was a spy in Egypt for the Ottoman Sultan Abdul Hamid II. Her comings and goings were minutely followed by the French police. During her stays, she went on family and official visits, including one to the French General Resident in his palace in La Marsa. She also contacted Tunisian reformist intellectuals and participated in several of their activities.

During her second Tunisian voyage in 1899 she met a young civil servant, Khelil Bouhageb, son of Salem Bouhageb and eventual Prime Minister of Tunisia, a man twenty years her junior who had studied in Paris. She decided to marry him. Since becoming a widow in 1879, Nazli had refused several marriage proposals, one coming from a governmental minister, the other from a prince. Instead of accepting the constraints of marriage, she preferred the liberty that her widowhood gave her. They married on 22 April 1900, and the marriage was registered at the French consulate of Cairo. After asking the French authorities for permission, she and her husband moved to Tunis.

In memoirs of her acquaintances, it is said that she had a quick wit and loved photographs, champagne, cigarettes and her pianola.

== Influence ==
In the 1880s she broke ground as the first woman to open a salon, frequented by men, mainly intellectuals and politicians who debated political and social issues, including "the woman question." Mixing unveiled with male guests Nazli violated strict gender conventions. In her palace, she hosted soirees, and was friendly with the intellectual elites of her day, including the Egyptians, Muhammad Abduh, Saad Zaghloul, and Qasim Amin, and the British, Lord Cromer and Herbert Kitchener. She was the individual who encouraged Saad Zaghlul to learn French. He had attended law school in Cairo and became legal advisor to her. She also arranged his marriage to Safiya Zaghloul. Additionally, it was at her insistence that Lord Cromer coordinated 'Abduh's return from exile in 1888.

== Later life and death ==
Nazli lived in La Marsa in a house that she named Villa Ramses. The abode became a cultural center that attracted the Tunisian intelligentsia. The house also became the pivot of relations between Tunis and Cairo. It was there that famous Egyptian personalities, such as the reformer Mohamed Abduh, met the Tunisian elite. He, in turn, invited the Tunisian Bashir Sfar to accompany him when he returned to Egypt. Through her, important Egyptians established contacts with the Young Tunisians.

On 13 October 1913, she fell while walking. The consequences of that fall were fatal, for after being transported to Cairo, she died on 28 December 1913. She was buried in the Fazil Mausoleum, Imam al-Shafi'i, Cairo.

== Patronages ==
- Patroness of literary salon in Cairo
- Honorary President of the Alliance of Eastern and Western Women
- Honorary member of the New England Conservatory of Music

== Ancestry ==
Ancestors of Nazli Fazil

16. Ibrahim Agha
8. Muhammad Ali Pasha
17. Zainab Hanim
4. Ibrahim Pasha
18. Nusratli Ali Agha
9. Amina Hanim
2. Mustafa Fazıl Pasha
5. Ulfat Qadin
1. Princess Nazli Fazil
3. Dilazad Hanim

== See also ==
- Women's literary salons and societies in the Arab world

== Sources ==
- Moreau, O.; Schaar, S.; Burke, E. (2016). Subversives and Mavericks in the Muslim Mediterranean: A Subaltern History. University of Texas Press. ISBN 978-1-4773-1091-5.
