= Sherif Pasha =

Sherif Pasha or Cherif Pasha may refer to:

- Mohamed Sherif Pasha
- Muhammad Sharif Pasha al-Kabir
- Şerif Pasha

== See also ==
- Ali Pasha Sherif
