= Hassine Bouhageb =

Tunisian doctor, educator, philanthropist (1872–1946)

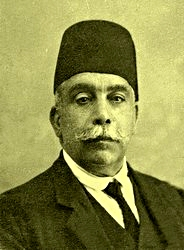
Hassine Bouhageb

Hassine Bouhageb (Arabic: حسين بوحاجب) (20 October 1872 – 13 March 1946). He was a Tunisian doctor, educator and a sponsor for the Tunisian sport.

== Early life and education ==
Hassine's father, Salem Bouhageb, was a big reformer in Europe and especially in Paris, Libourne and Florence. He sent his son to France to study at the Lycée Lakanal high school in Sceaux.

After graduation, Bouhageb enrolled in the medical school of Bordeaux where he received his medical doctorate 23 December 1901.

== Career ==
Upon his return to Tunisia, he started the Tunisia renewal and modernization movement with Ali Bach Hamba, Bechir Sfar and Abdeljelil Zaouche.

He representedsample of new generation who, after finishing their studies abroad, wanted to improve their nation's conditions by continuing the reformist movement that the general Hayreddin Pasha, Mohamed Bayram V and his father started earlier.

In 1902, Bouhageb was appointed to direct the Tekia, which offered assistance to the mentally ill. In 1924, he was succeeded by a psychiatrist, Georges Perrussel, who described the Tekia at the time as "barbaric galleys" (chiourme barbare).

On 31 December 1904, Bouhageb became head of service in the Sadiki Hospital. Later, he was transferred to the Ernest-Conseil Hospital.

In 1911, he was elected as the headmaster of the Tunisian Muslim Association and the municipal society of Nasria. He led the Ech-Chahama Al Arabya theater troupe between 1915 and 1930.

He made a remarkable contribution during the fight to counter the epidemics that persisted even thirty years after the establishment of the French protectorate of Tunisia.

Bouhageb published many works about child nutrition and on how to improve nutrition in Tunisia. He was also the initiator of the development of sport activities in Tunisia.

== Personal life ==
He was Khelil Bouhageb's brother, who became grand vizier.
