= Mustafa Fazıl Pasha =

Ottoman-Egyptian prince of ethnic Albanian descent

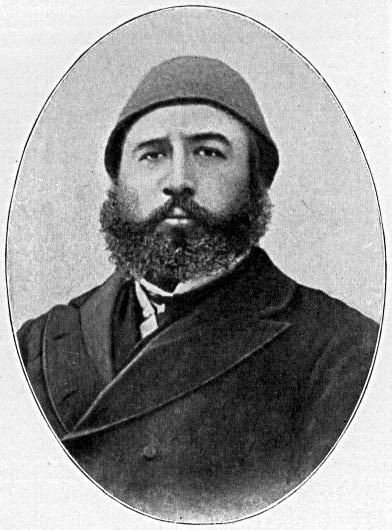
- Born: 20 February 1832; Cairo, Egypt Eyalet, Ottoman Empire
- Died: 2 December 1875 (aged 43); Istanbul, Ottoman Empire
- Burial: 3 December 1875; Mustafa Fazıl Pasha Mausoleum, Eyüp, Istanbul, later reburied on 25 June 1927 in Cairo, Egypt
- Consorts: Dilazad Hanim; Rengi Gul Hanim; Ramziya Hanim; Misli Jihan Qadin; Gonjaleb Qadin; Ahufar Qadin; Nawayush Qadin; Labriza Qadin; Afitab Qadin; Bihruz Qadin; Naz Amsal Qadin
- Issue: see below
- Dynasty: Muhammad Ali
- Father: Ibrahim Pasha of Egypt
- Mother: Ulfat Qadin

Mustafa Fazıl Pasha (Arabic: مصطفى بهجت علي فاضل باشا; 20 February 1832 – 2 December 1875) was an Ottoman-Egyptian prince of ethnic Albanian descent belonging to the Muhammad Ali Dynasty founded by his grandfather Muhammad Ali Pasha.

== Life ==
Prince Mustafa was born on 20 February 1830 at Cairo. He was the third son of Ibrahim Pasha of Egypt and his consort Ulfat Qadin (died 1865). He was educated at the Egyptian Mission School in Paris. When he was eleven years of age Mustafa was circumcised. On January 18, 1863, Prince Mustafa became the heir apparent to his brother Isma'il Pasha but on May 28, 1866, Ismail paid the Ottoman Sultan Abdülaziz to issue a firman so that the succession became by a direct male line of the reigning Khedive (viceroy) instead of passing from brother to brother. In protest of this decision, Mustafa Fazl Pasha left Egypt for Paris, where he patronized the Young Ottomans opposition against the Sultan Abdulaziz.

After losing his first place in the Egyptian line of succession, Prince Mustafa was appointed Ottoman minister for education in 1862, minister for finance in 1864 and 1869, and minister for justice from 1871 until 1872.

== Death ==
Mustafa Fazıl died on 2 December 1875 at his mansion located in Vezneciler, Bayezit, Istanbul. He was initially buried in Eyüp. On 25 June 1927, he was reburied in Cairo.

== Personal life ==
Consorts

Prince Mustafa Fazıl had eleven consorts:

- Rengi Gul Hanim (died 1891, buried in Mustafa Fazıl Pasha Mausoleum, Eyüp), mother of Prince Osman Pasha, and Princess Fatima Aziza Amina Hanim;
- Dilazad Hanim (1837 – 1885), an Anatolian, and mother of Princess Nazli Zainab Hanim;
- Ramziya Hanim (died 10 June 1867, buried in Mustafa Fazıl Pasha Mausoleum, Eyüp);
- Labriza Qadin (died 1895), mother of Princess Rukiya Hanim;
- Afitab Qadin (died 1900), mother of Prince Muhammad Ali Pasha, and Prince Husameddin Pasha;
- Nawayush Qadin (died 1903), mother of Prince Ali Kamil Pasha;
- Misli Jihan Qadin (died 1921), mother of Prince Ahmad Rushdi;
- Bihruz Qadin (died 1876), mother of Prince Ibrahim Rashid Pasha;
- Ahufar Qadin (died 1903), mother of Princess Fatima Hanim;
- Naz Amsal Qadin (died 1902), mother of Princess Zahra Hanim and Princess Saniya Hanim;
- Gonjaleb Qadin (died 1933), mother of Prince Ali Fazil;

Sons

He had seven sons:

- Prince Osman Pasha (1850 – 1898), married Pakiza Hanim (died 1 May 1922, buried in Imam al-Shafi'i, Cairo);
- Prince Muhammad Ali Pasha (1857 – 1915), married firstly to Melek Hanim, daughter of General Hilmi Pasha, married secondly to Princess Nazli Hanim (1864 – 1945), daughter of Muhammad Abdul Halim Pasha, son of Muhammad Ali Pasha and Taranidil Hanim;
- Prince Ali Kamil Pasha (1858 – 18 April 1929, Nice, France, buried in Imam al-Shafi'i, Cairo); married firstly in 1881 and divorced in 1886 to Princess Naima Hanim (1862 – 1904), daughter of Ismail Pasha, son of Muhammad Ali Pasha the younger, son of Muhammad Ali Pasha, and Nazikper Qadin, married secondly in 1886 to Saliha Zainab Ayad;
- Prince Ahmad Rushdi (1858 – 1879, buried in Mustafa Fazıl Pasha Mausoleum, Eyüp), married Ferahdil Hanim (died 1883, buried in Mustafa Fazıl Pasha Mausoleum, Eyüp);
- Prince Ibrahim Rashid Pasha (1861 – 16 December 1907, buried in Imam al-Shafi'i, Cairo); married Dawlet Hanim (died 1911), daughter of Ratib Pasha;
- Prince Husameddin (1868 – 21 July 1897, buried in Mustafa Fazıl Pasha Mausoleum, Eyüp), married Melek Hanim, daughter of Abdurrahman Sami Pasha Morali;
- Prince Ali Fazil (1875 – 1925), married Martha Suarez;

Daughters

He had six daughters:

- Princess Nazli Zainab Hanim (1853 – 28 December 1913, buried in Imam al-Shafi'i, Cairo), married firstly in 1872 to Khalil Sherif Pasha, married secondly in 1900 to Khelil Bouhageb; She was a prominent member of Cairo society and hostess to the first literary salon in the Arab world;
- Princess Fatima Aziza Amina Hanim (1854 – 1895, buried in Mustafa Fazıl Pasha Mausoleum, Eyüp), married Keçeçizade Izzet Fuad Pasha, grandson of Mehmed Fuad Pasha;
- Princess Rukiya Hanim (1856 – 1906), married Tahir Bey, son of Tunuslu Mahmud Ayad;
- Princess Fatima Hanim (1861 – 1933), married Misirli Fuad Pasha, an Albanian;
- Princess Zahra Hanim (1868 – 1915), married Mustafa Pasha Orfi;
- Princess Saniya Hanim (1870 – 1905), married Khalid Ali Salih Naili, a Cretan;

== Ancestry ==
Ancestors of Mustafa Fazıl Pasha

8. Ibrahim Agha
4. Muhammad Ali Pasha
9. Zainab Hanim
2. Ibrahim Pasha
10. Nusratli Ali Agha
5. Amina Hanim
1. Mustafa Fazıl Pasha
3. Ulfat Qadin

== See also ==
- Muhammad Ali Dynasty
- Muhammad Ali Dynasty family tree
