= Tanja Ostojić =

Serbian artist

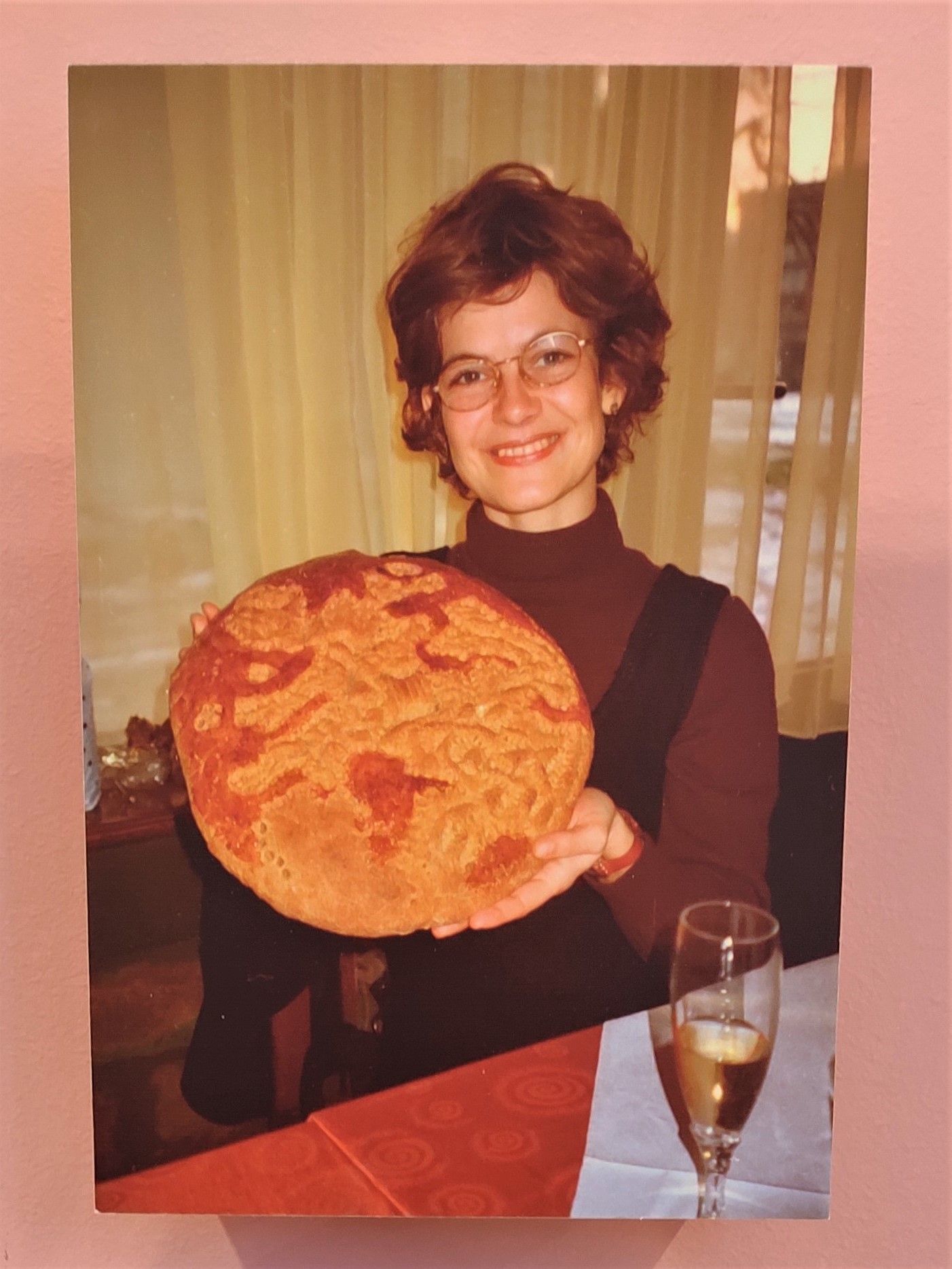
- Photo of Tanja Ostojić holding a pogača as part of the "Nineties: A Dictionary of Migration" exhibition at the Museum of Yugoslavia
- Born: 19 August 1972 (age 54); Užice, Yugoslavia
- Citizenship: Serbian
- Occupation: Artist

Tanja Ostojić (born 19 August 1972 in Titovo Užice, Yugoslavia) is a feminist performance artist. Her work draws inspiration from her own experience as a non-European Union citizen, a traveler and female artist. Ostojić has lived in Serbia, Slovenia, France, and Germany, but refuses to claim any particular nationality.

== O.t. / after Courbet ==
In December 2005, Ostojić became well known in Europe as a result of her poster After Courbet, L'Origine du monde, also referred to informally as "EU Panties" The work, a satire of French Realist Gustave Courbet's 1866 painting L'Origine du monde, was first displayed on billboards at the public exhibition EuroPart held in Vienna in December 2005 – January 2006. Ostojić's version displayed her own crotch, clothed in blue underwear complete with EU stars. The image was meant as an ironic suggestion that foreign women are only welcome in Europe when they drop their underwear.

Along with other works from an ongoing art exhibition, this poster was selected to publicly promote Austria's presidency of the Council of the European Union. Vienna's Kronen Zeitung newspaper turned this selection into something of a scandal, expressing its outrage over state-funded pornography and its concern for Austria's world image. Anxious politicians of all parties quickly joined in, resulting in the poster being taken down. Since then, the picture – which had already been shown several times without a title in 2005 – has been informally known as the "EU Panties" (German: EU-Unterhose).

== Earlier activities ==
Ostojić's grand theme is the "arrogance of the EU" with regards to the integration of south-eastern Europe into the union. For south-east Europeans, and particularly women, becoming resident in the EU is often only possible through marriage, which Ostojić depicts as a form of prostitution. From 2000 to 2003, she publicly addressed this issue in an online performance piece, Looking for a husband with a EU passport, in which she presented herself naked and with a shaven head, possibly reminiscent of a prisoner from socialist times. This led to an actual marriage to an artist from Cologne, from whom she then separated in 2005, again as an online performance.

At the Venice Biennale in 2001, her performance I'll Be Your Angel involved her following around the independent curator and art historian Harald Szeemann – who had at his disposal a significant budget – for days, all the time simply smiling fondly at him. The one-time "great subversive" Szeemann did not see the funny side of this, however, and made sure she was excluded from all his projects.
