= Deborah De Robertis =

Performance artist and photographer

- Born: Deborah De Robertis; 12 February 1984 (age 42); Luxembourg
- Occupations: Performance artist; photographer

Deborah De Robertis (born 12 February 1984) is a performance artist and photographer from Luxembourg. She studied at the School of Graphic Research in Belgium and as of May 2020 was living in Brussels.

== Biography ==
De Robertis was born in Luxembourg on 12 February 1984.

== Work ==
In 2014, media attention was initially drawn to her when she executed "Mirror of Origin", an impromptu performance in which she exposed her genitals at the Musée d'Orsay in front of Gustave Courbet's painting L'Origine du monde.

In 2016, she posed nude at the Musée d'Orsay in front of Édouard Manet's Olympia.

In 2018, De Robertis organized a happening during a yellow vests movement demonstration in Paris. Along with four other women dressed as Marianne, the symbolic figure of the French Republic, covered with silver paint and bare-chested, she stood silently facing a riot squad.

In May 2024, De Robertis organized a protest during which five works at the Centre Pompidou-Metz, including L'Origine du monde and an embroidered work by Annette Messager, were defaced with the words "Me too".

== See also ==
- Olympia (1865), painting by Édouard Manet
- L'Origine du monde (1866), painting by Gustave Courbet
- Marianne, French national symbol
