= Tunis Jewish Hospital =

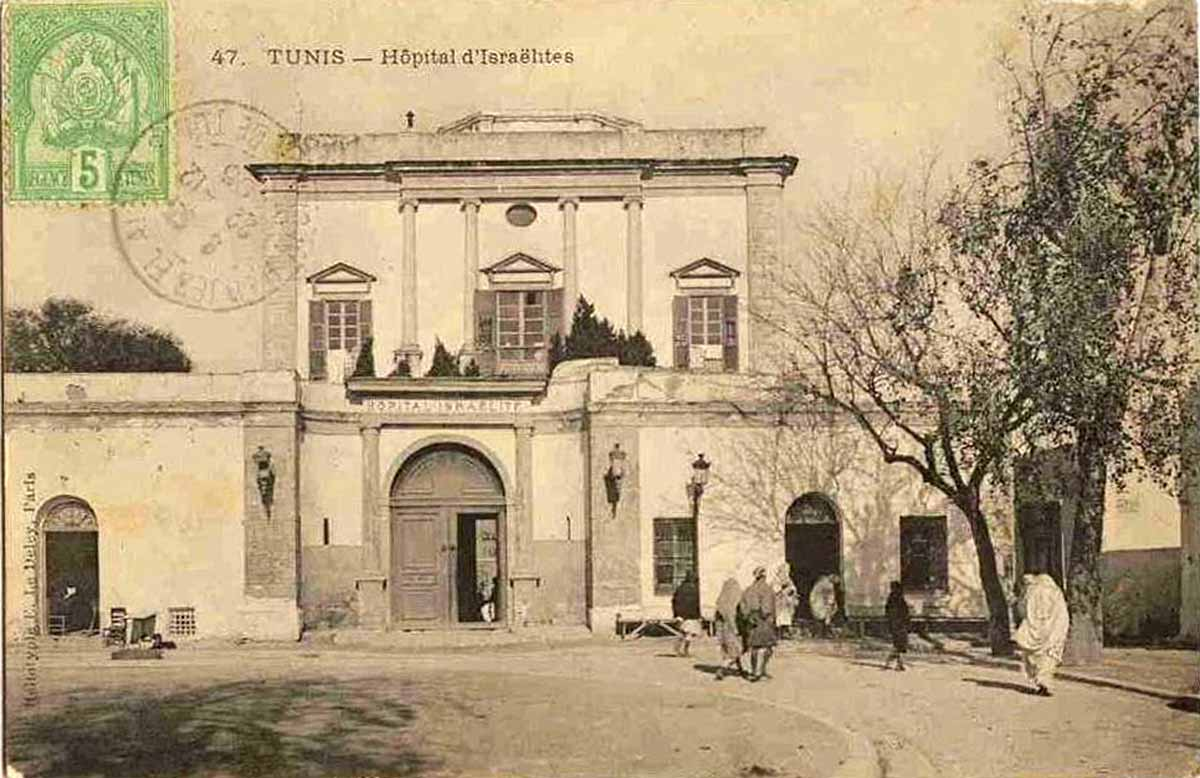
- Jewish Hospital in 1890 from postcard

Geography
- Location: el Halfaouine, Tunis, Tunisia

Organisation
- Type: General
- Religious affiliation: Jews

History
- Opened: 1895
- Closed: 1956

Links
- Lists: Hospitals in Tunisia

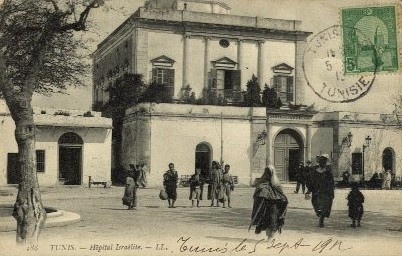
Postcard showing the hospital between 1900 and 1956

The Jewish Hospital of Tunis (arabe : المستشفى الإسرائيلي بتونس) was a former Tunisian hospital founded for the Tunisian Jewish community. It was founded by Jewish doctors from Livorno. It opened in 1895 at Place Halfaouine, a suburb north of the Medina of Tunis.

Housed in the Khaznadar Palace, it was dedicated to the Jews living in the Hara Quarter of the Tunis Medina.
