= Taner Ceylan =

Taner Ceylan (born 1967) is a German-born Turkish photo-realist artist. He lives and works in Istanbul.

== Biography ==
Taner Ceylan studied painting in the Fine Arts Faculty at Mimar Sinan University between 1986 - 1991. He then worked for the Fine Arts Faculty of Yeditepe University between 2001 and 2003 as a lecturer and worked as an editor in chief of arts of Time Out Istanbul Magazine between 2001 and 2006. Many of his painting are in private collections such as those of Martin Browne, Dan Cameron, Fethi Pekin, and museum collections such as the Dr. F. Nejat Eczacıbasi Foundation and the Scheringa Museum of Realist Art.

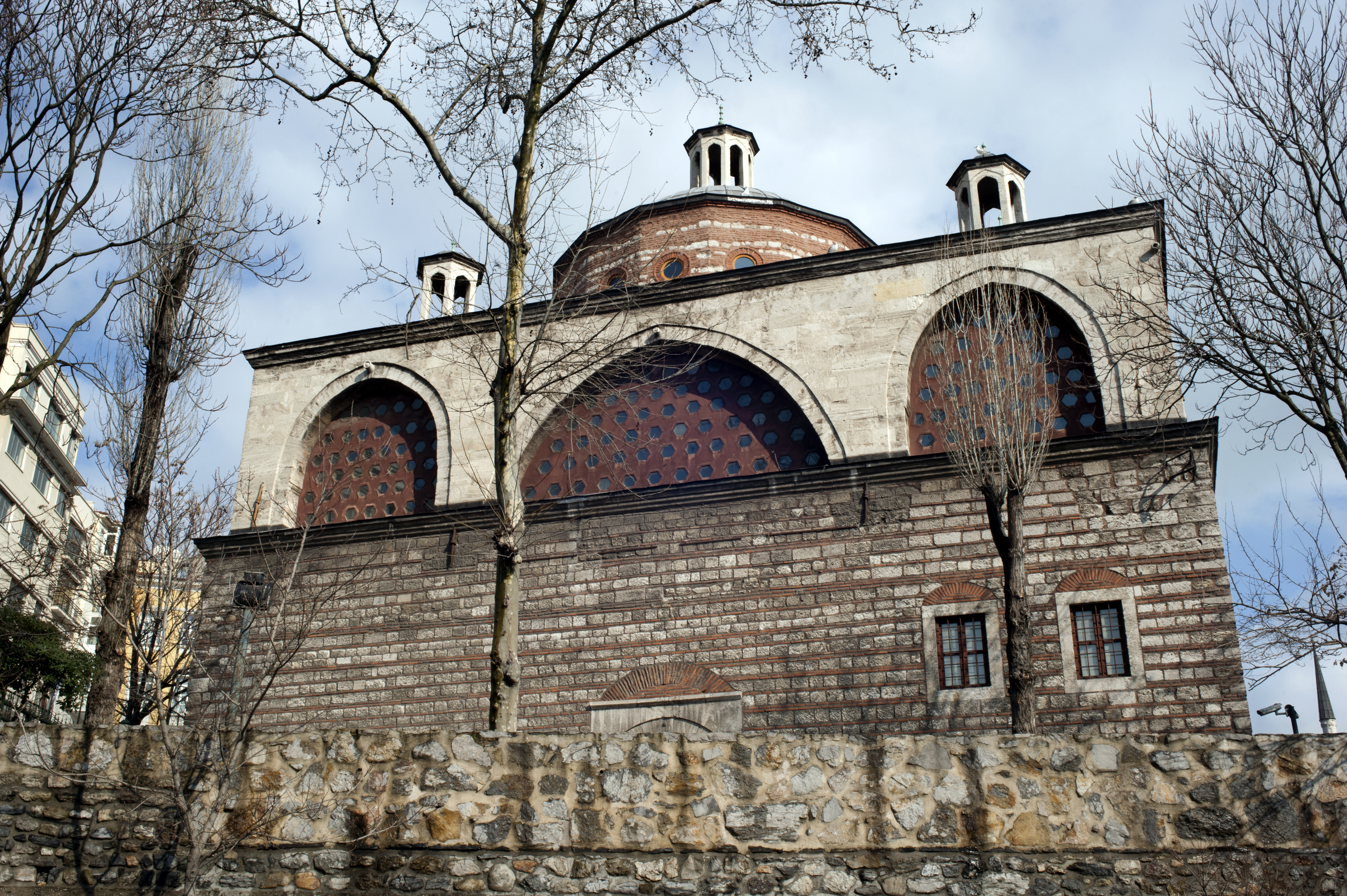
Tophane ("Cannon House"), a principal military foundry in the Ottoman Empire, is today a center of arts belonging to Mimar Sinan University in Tophane, Istanbul

His highest priced work is the painting 1879 (From the Lost Paintings Series) (2011) in which a veiled Ottoman noblewoman stands before the framed canvas of L'Origine du monde. He is represented by Paul Kasmin Gallery in New York City.

== Exhibitions ==
=== Solo ===
- 2013 The Lost Paintings Series, Paul Kasmin Gallery, New York
- 2011 The Lost Paintings Series, Galerist, Istanbul, Turkey
- 2010 Galerist, Istanbul, Turkey
- 2009 Abstraction of Nothing, I-20 Gallery, New York
- 2005 De-Composed, Galerist, Istanbul, Turkey
- 2002 1997 / 2002, Galerist, Istanbul, Turkey
- 1997 More, Derimod Art Gallery, Istanbul, Turkey
- 1996 Steven Maurice, Meannertreu, Nürnberg, Germany
- 1995 The Monte Carlo Style, Devlet Han, Istanbul, Turkey
- 1994 Young Osman, Armenian Catholic Monastery, Istanbul, Turkey
- 1992 Private Party, Derimod Art Gallery, Istanbul, Turkey
- 1991 Scandal, Galerie Fliederlich, Nürnberg, Germany and Mannsbild, Galerie Hemdendienst, Nürnberg, Germany

=== Group ===
- 2011 Double Crescents, Chelsea24 Gallery, New York, USA and Confessions of Dangerous Minds Contemporary Art from Turkey, Phillips De Pury & Company Rooms, Saatchi Gallery, London, UK
- 2010 İstanbul Next Wave, Martin Gropius Bau, Berlin, Germany and New Works, New Horizons, Istanbul Modern, Istanbul, Turkey
- 2009 Naked!, curated by Adrian Dannatt, Paul Kasmin Gallery, New York.
- 2006 Works on Paper, Galerist, Istanbul, Turkey
- 2005 Free-Kick, 9th Istanbul Biennial, Istanbul, Turkey and Liaisons, Stephane Ackermann, Agence D'Art Contemporain, Luxembourg
- 2004 Poetic Justice, curated by Dan Cameron, 8th Istanbul Biennial, Turkey
- 2003 Families Only / Aileye Mahsus, Karsi Sanat Calismalari, Istanbul, Turkey and Contemporary Art Fair, Istanbul
- 2002 Dangerous Things, curated by Levent Calikoglu, Karsi Sanat, Istanbul, Turkey
- 1997 Performance Days, Darphane, Istanbul, Turkey
- 1995 Young Artists Exhibition, Istanbul, Turkey and Youth Events / Genc Etkinlik, TUYAP, Istanbul, Turkey
- 1993 Recollection Memory2 / Ani Bellek2, curated by Vasif Kortun, Akaretler, Istanbul, Turkey
- 1991 Kassel Exhibition, Kassel, Germany and Mixed Eight / Sekizli Karma, Mimar Sinan University, Istanbul, Turkey
- 1990 Mixed Contemporary, Cemal Resit Rey, Istanbul, Turkey

== Seminars and conferences ==
- 2010 Istancool, LTHM, Istanbul, Turkey
- 2006 Hinterland Lambda, Istanbul, Turkey
- 2006 Artistic Reflections of Personal Experiences Kaos GL Ankara, Turkey
- 2004 The Meta Modern Era in Art History, Bogazici University, Istanbul, Turkey
- 1990 Kassel's Documenta, M.S.U.Oditorium, Istanbul, Turkey
- 1990 Joseph Beuys, M.S.U.Oditorium, Istanbul, Turkey
- 1991 Anselm Kiefer, M.S.U.Oditorium, Istanbul, Turkey
- 1999 Homosexual Aesthetic in the Art History, NON Studio, Istanbul, Turkey

== Sources ==
- Quist, Taylor, "The Emotional Reality of Taner Ceylan," Whitewall, 10/01/13.
- Unsal, Merve, "The Brutally Realistic Fictions of Taner Ceylan's 'Lost Paintings'," ArtInfo, 09/26/13.
- "Taner Ceylan solo exhibition opens in New York," Hurriyet Daily News, 09/20/13.
- "Taner Ceylan, 'The Lost Paintings Series'," Time Out, 09/03/13.
- Lescaze, Zoe, "Painter Taner Ceylan talks Turkish Protests, 'Lost Paintings'," Gallerist NY, 07/24/13.
- http://www.anibellek.org/?p=357
- http://www.hurriyet.com.tr/cumartesi/17248201_p.asp
