= Khaznadar Palace =

Palace in Tunis, Tunisia

Coordinates: 36.797753°N 10.169065°E

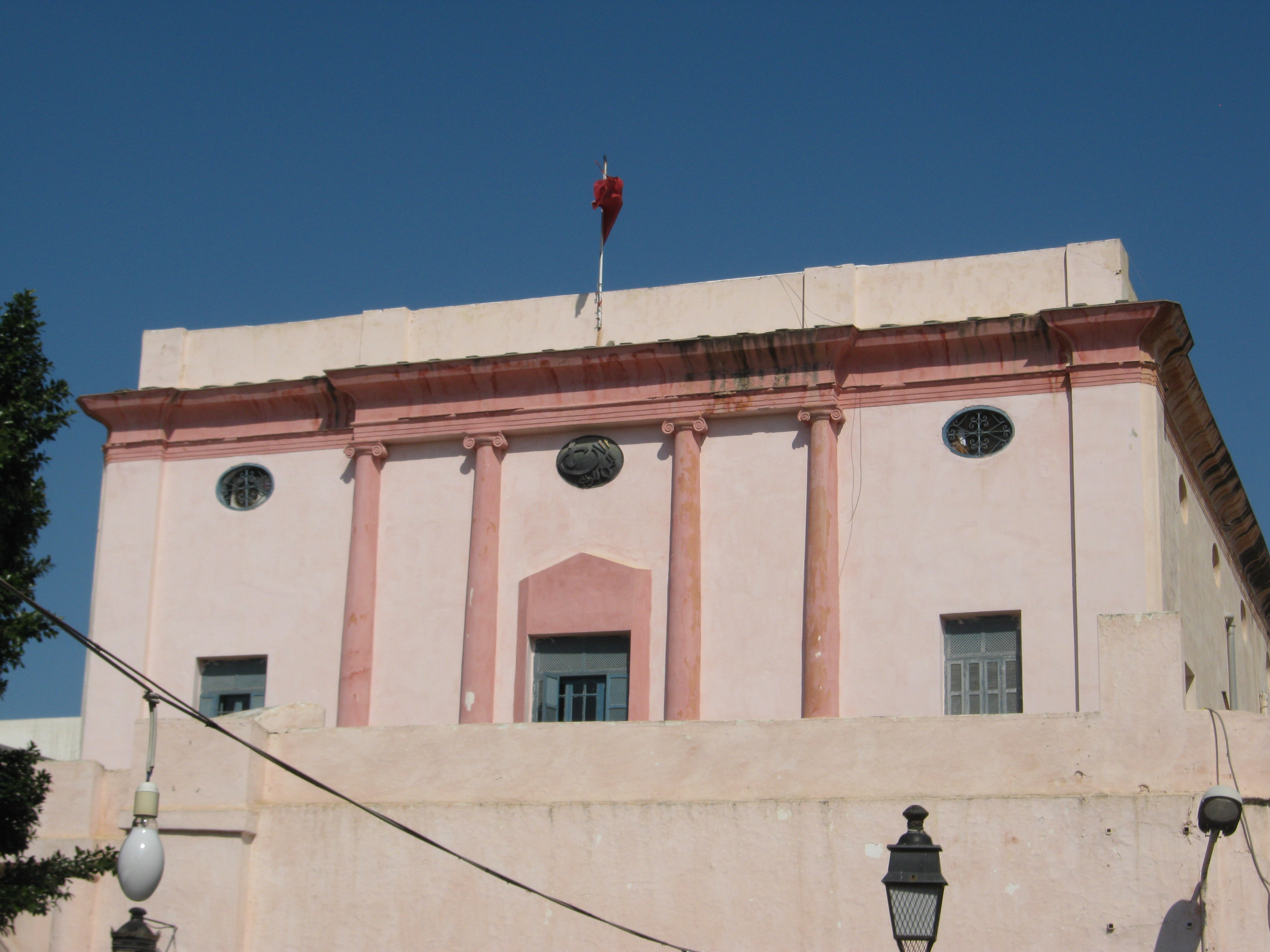
- Interactive map of the Khaznadar Palace area

General information
- Type: Palace
- Architectural style: Italian
- Location: Medina of Tunis, Tunis, Tunisia
- Year built: 1850
- Client: Mustapha Khaznadar

The Khaznadar Palace is a Tunisian palace in the neighborhood of Halfaouin. It is one of the palaces of the Medina of Tunis.

== Localization ==
The palace is in the northeast of the Halfaouine square. It is located near two other landmarks, the Saheb Ettabaa palace and Saheb Ettabaa mosque.

== History ==
Khaznadar Palace has been built in the 19th century, around 1850, by the current minister at that time, Mustapha Khaznadar.

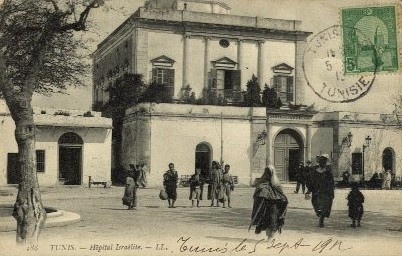
Old view of the palace

Between 1895 and 1903, it has been used as a hospital for the Jewish community in Tunis. In 1903, the palace became a school and stayed that way until 1986. During the second world war, it served temporarily as a milk distribution center for the Israelian community.

Since 1988, the palace hosts a couple activities of the National Tunisian theater.
