= List of hospitals in Tunisia =

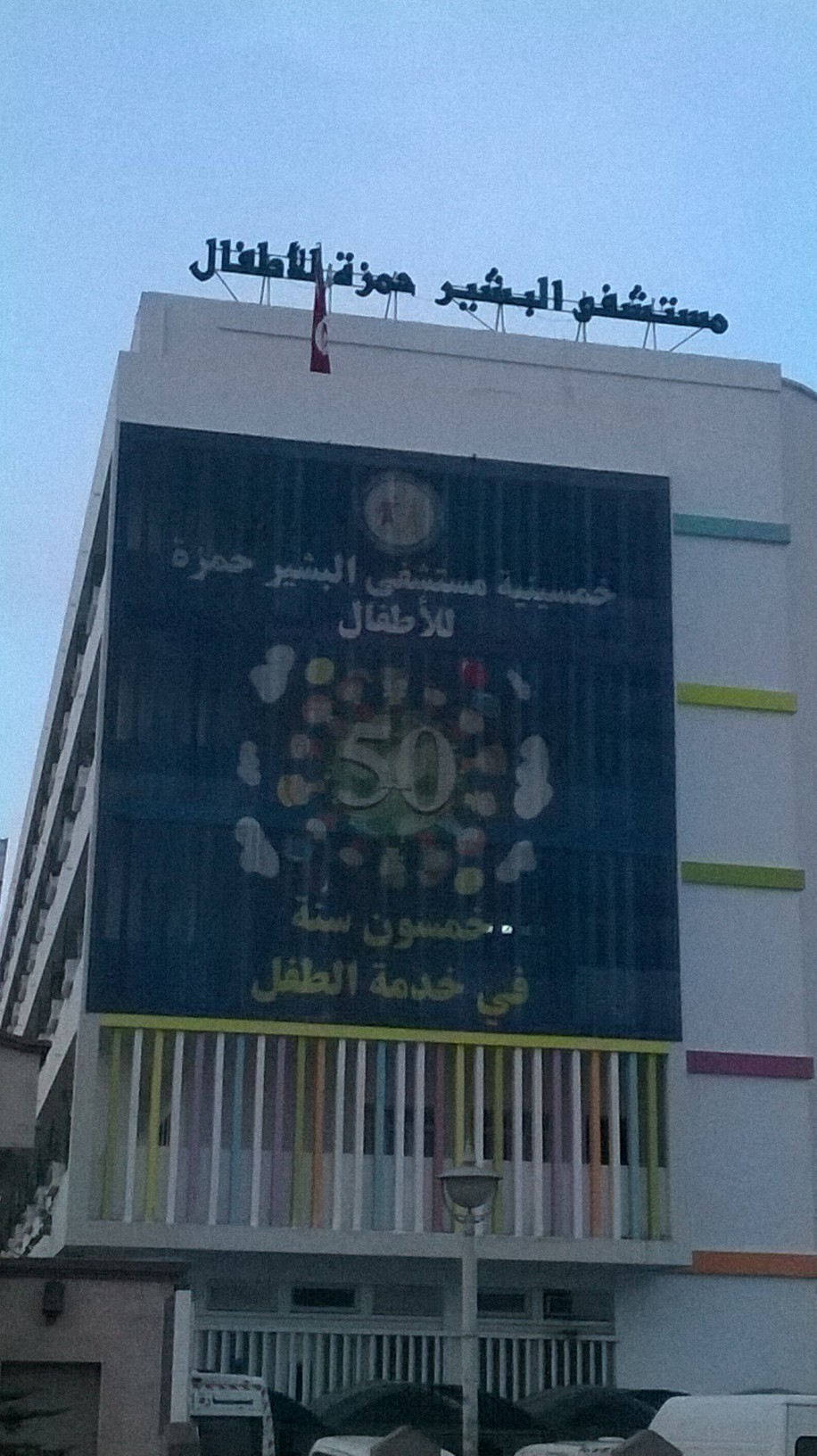
Béchir-Hamza Children's Hospital, Tunis

This is a list of hospitals in Tunisia. The hospitals include public regional, university, and district hospitals, as well as private hospitals. In 2021, there were over 2,000 medical facilities, including 180 hospitals in Tunisia. The number of hospitals has been increasing since the 1950s, as shown in the table below.

Number of hospitals in Tunisia by type
Type	1957	1987	2009
Primary, specialty, and university hospitals	56	20	29
Regional hospitals	17	22	34
Local and maternity hospitals	31	99	121

As of 2017, there were 209 regional and district hospitals in Tunisia.

== Hospitals ==
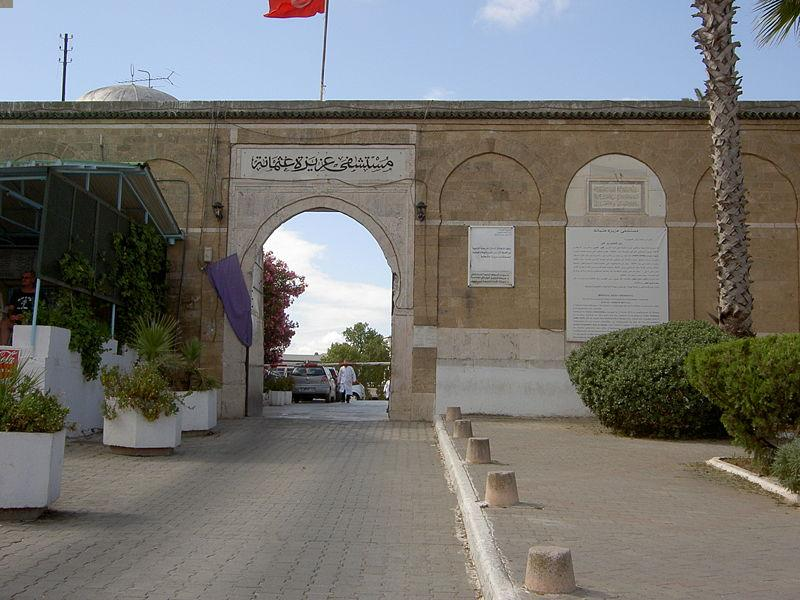
Aziza Othmana Hospital, Tunis

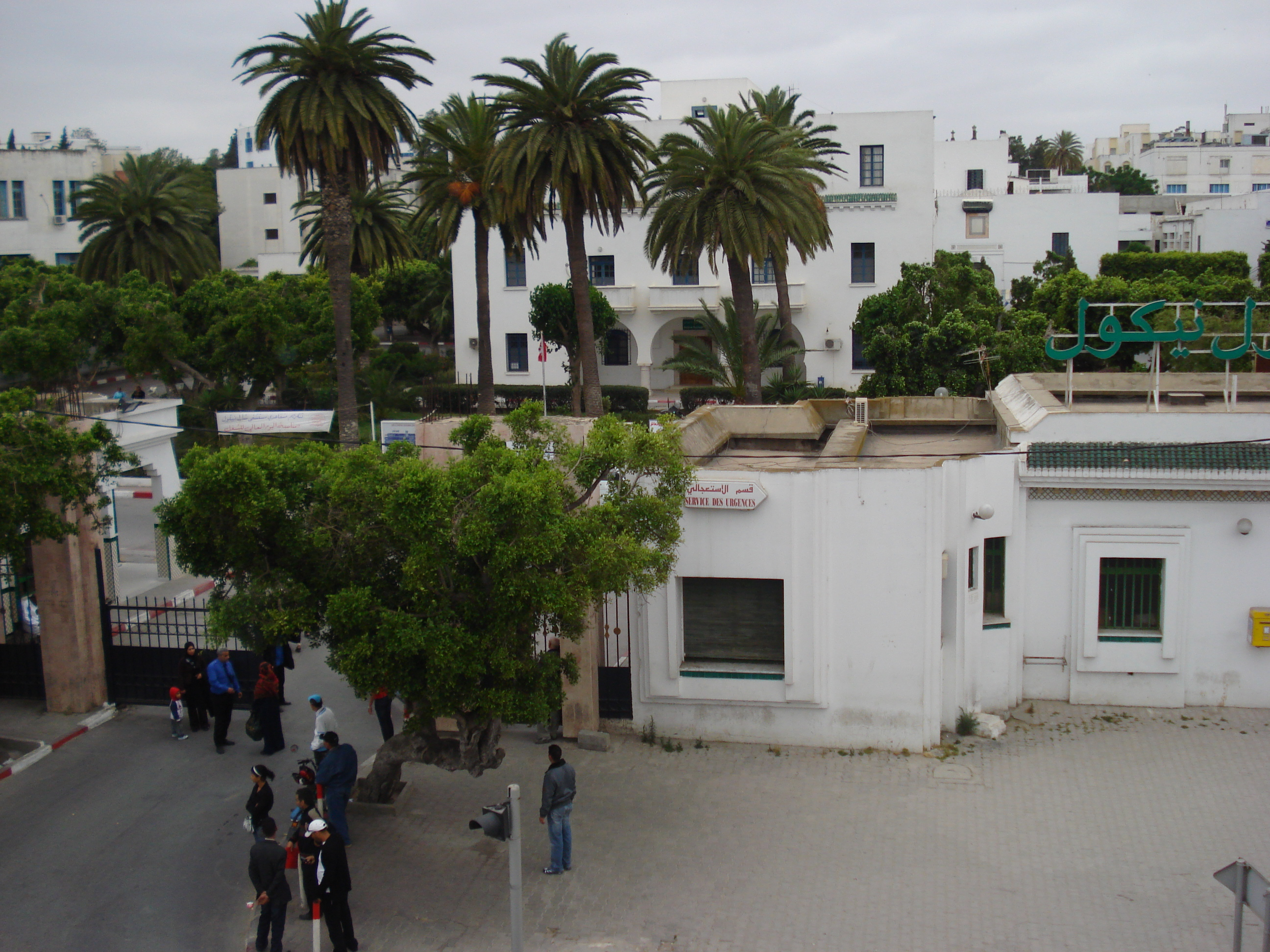
Charles Nicolle Hospital, Tunis

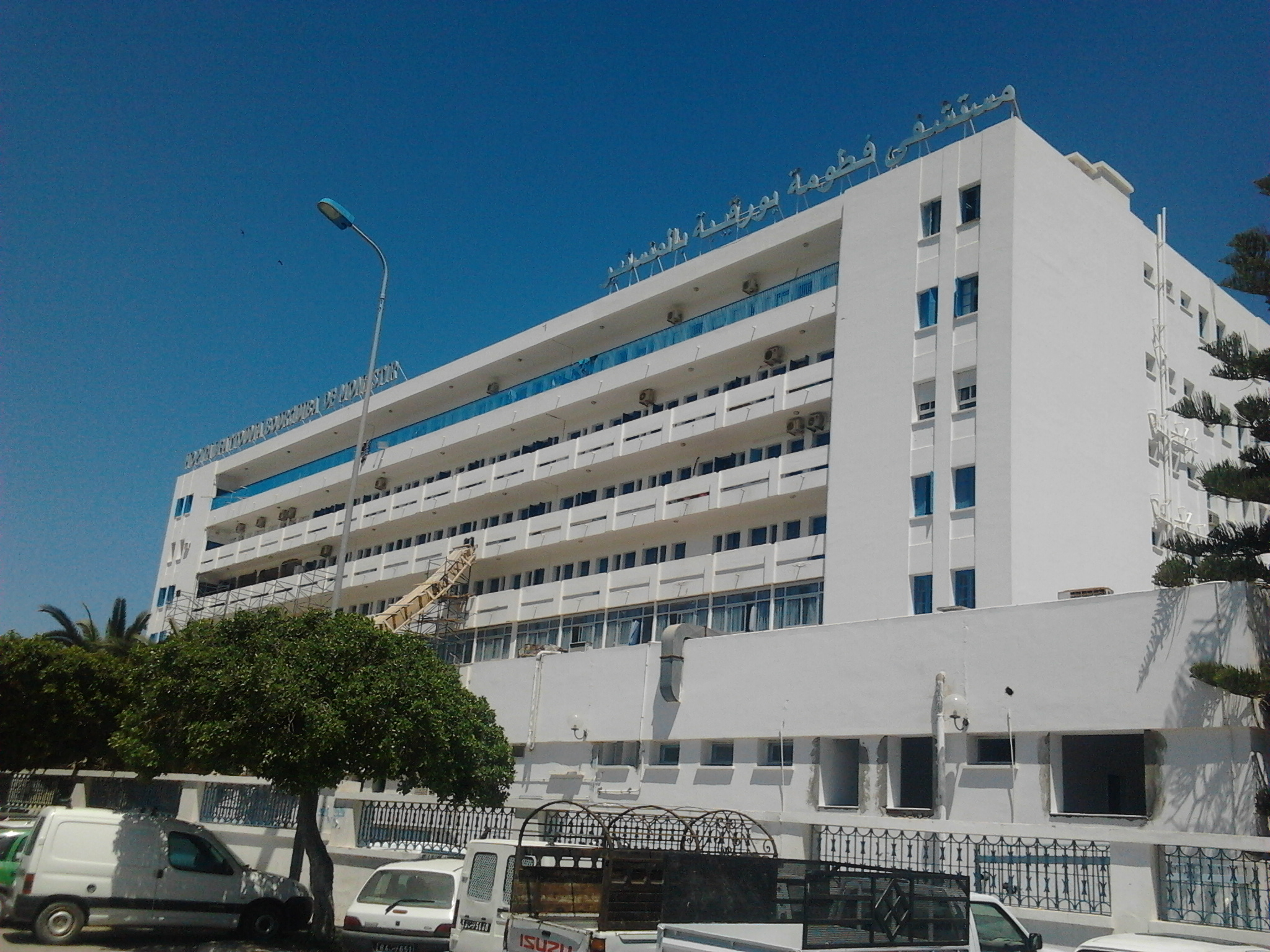
Fattouma-Bourguiba Hospital, Monastir

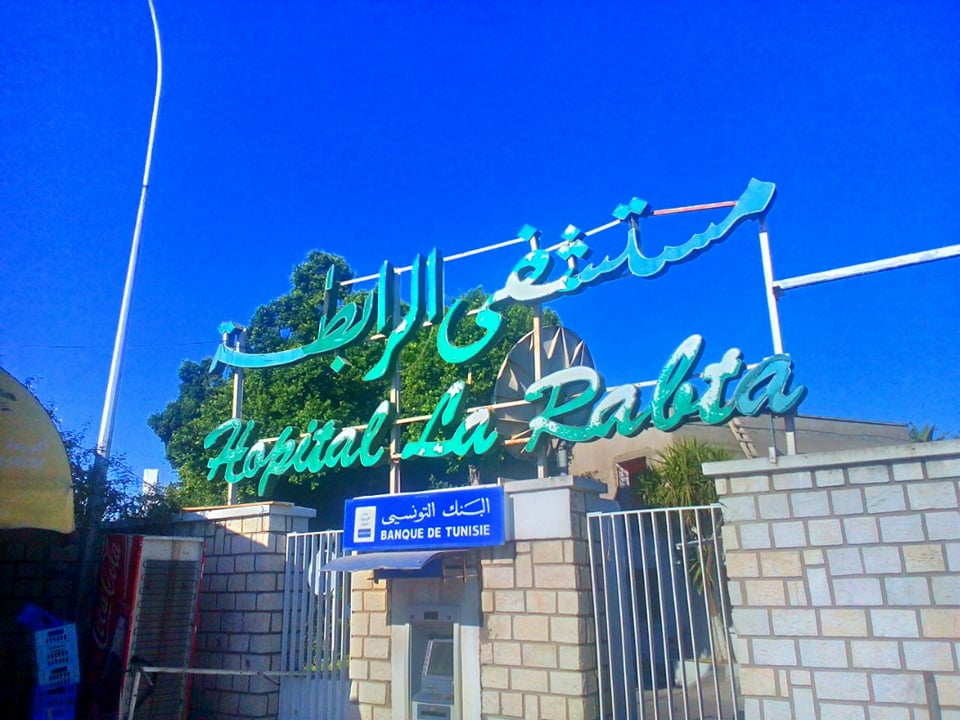
Rabta Hospital, Tunis

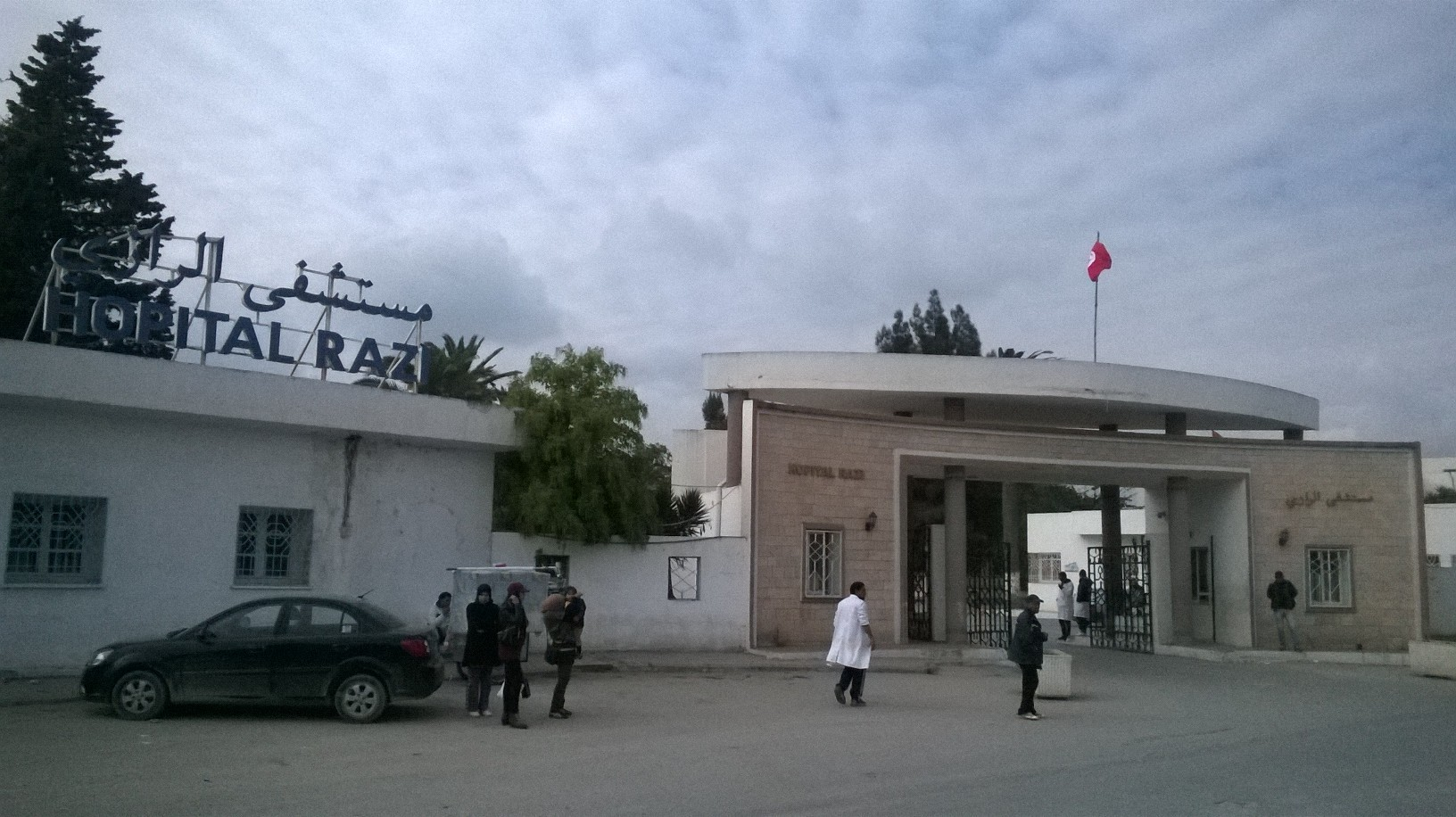
Razi Psychiatric Hospital, La Manouba

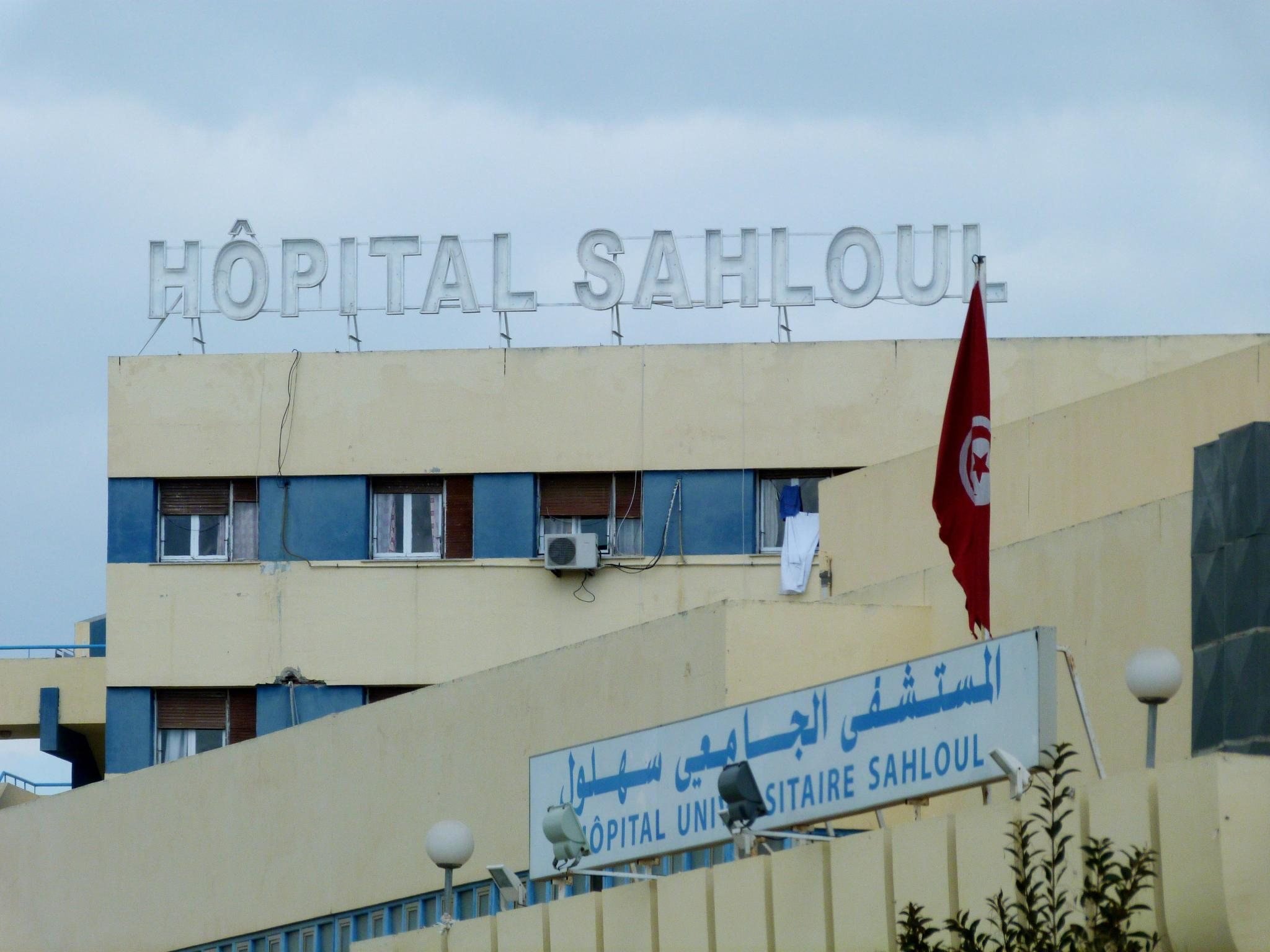
Sahloul Hospital, Sousse

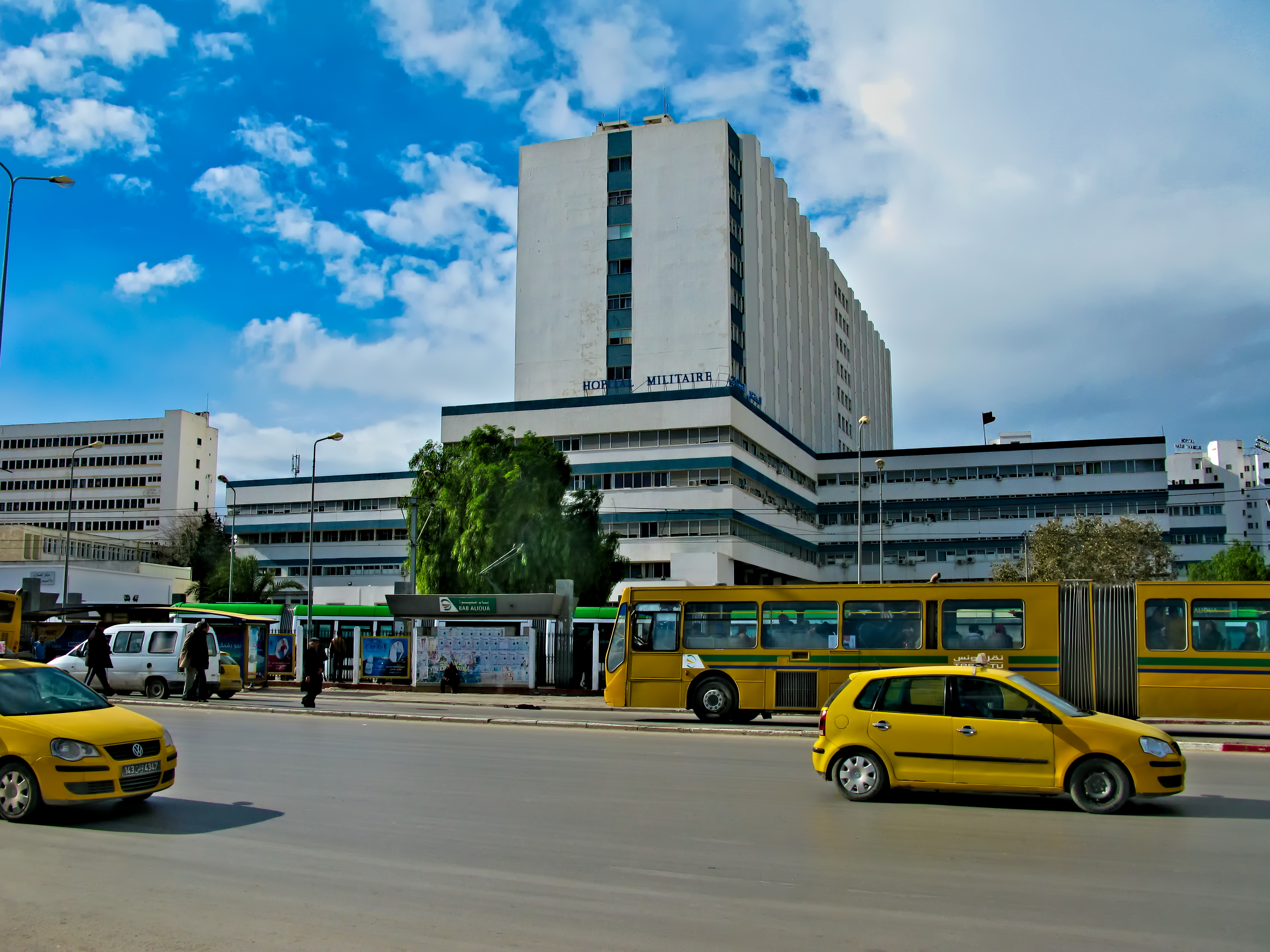
Tunis Military Hospital

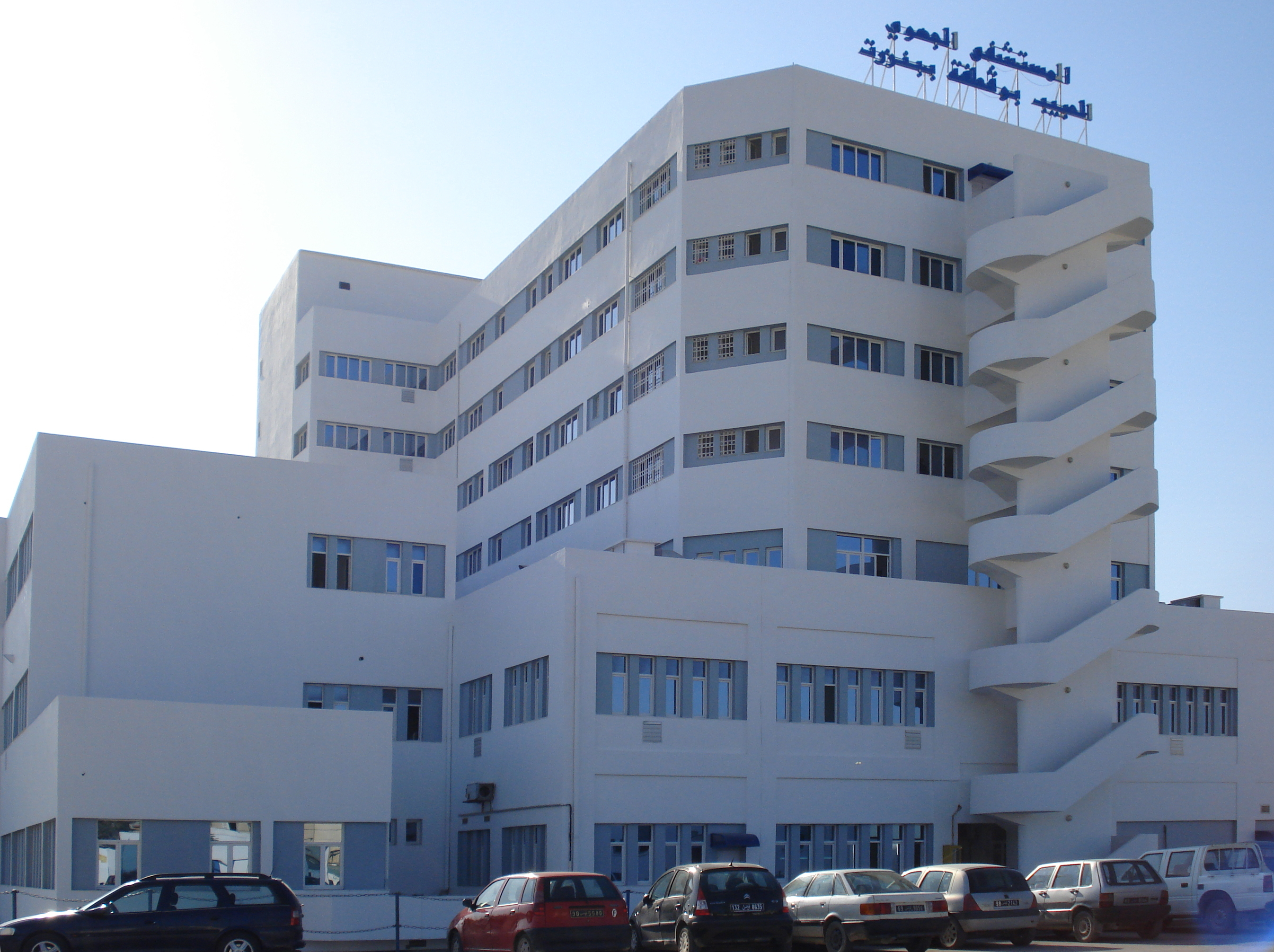
Bizerte Regional Hospital

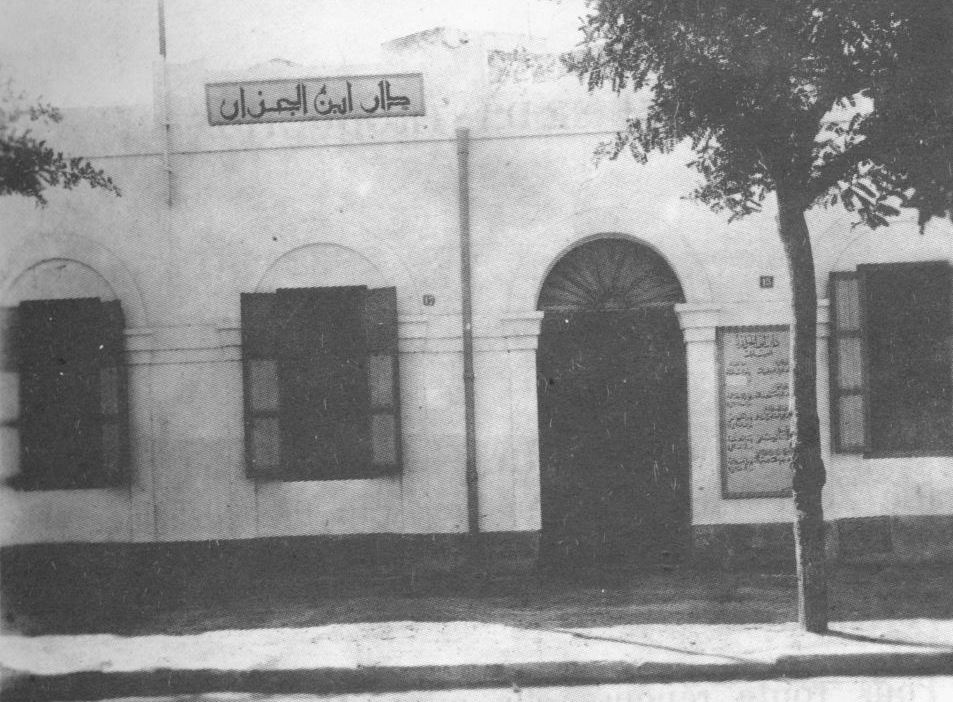
Ibn El Jazar Hospital, 1936

The notable hospitals are listed in the table below, along with the location and references for individual hospitals.

Hospitals in Tunisia
Name	Governorate	Type Hospital	Coordinates	Ref
Abderrahmane Mami Pneumophistiology Hospital	Ariana Governorate	Public hospital	36.870016756618014°N 10.178232168267794°E	
Aziza Othmana Hospital	Tunis Governorate	University hospital	36.804479441975985°N 10.168527370209272°E	
Béchir-Hamza Children's Hospital (aka: Bab Saadoun Children's Hospital)	Tunis Governorate	Children's' hospital	36.806965°N 10.159248°E	.
Bizerte Military Hospital	Bizerte Governorate, Bizerte	Military hospital	37.271649°N 9.861823°E	
Bou Assida Regional Hospital	Sfax Governorate	Regional	35.02921860076214°N 10.769963436222296°E	
Carthage International Medical Center	Tunis Governorate	Private	36.85137563795076°N 10.19897743390939°E	
Charles-Nicolle Hospital	Tunis Governorate	Hospital	36.802254°N 10.161104°E	founded in 1897
Farhat-Hached University Hospital	Sousse Governorate	University hospital	35.82980164750222°N 10.627770854737062°E	
Fattouma-Bourguiba Hospital	Monastir Governorate	University hospital	35.7704491°N 10.8340303°E	Founded in 1910
Gabès Military Hospital	Gabès Governorate	Military hospital	33.883714°N 10.112561°E	
Habib Bougatfa University Hospital	Bizerte Governorate	University Hospital	37.27223010349493°N 9.860213641493038°E	
Habib-Bourguiba Hospital	Sfax Governorate	Hospital	34.99607231699144°N 10.696084158875541°E	
Habib Thameur Hospital	Tunis Governorate		36.786261191659236°N 10.176607741282961°E	
Hédi-Chaker Hospital	Sfax Governorate	Governate hospital	34.74093607147375°N 10.750303797023506°E	
Hedi Jaballah Tozeur Regional Hospital	Tozeur Governorate, Tozeur	Regional	33.91681436366101°N 8.129539533249242°E	
Houcine Bouzaiene Regional Hospital	Gafsa Governorate	Regional	34.420263641428285°N 8.7961696546845°E	
Ibn El Jazzar University Hospital	Kairouan Governorate	University	35.79958151813685°N 10.102609398840514°E	
Jendouba Regional Hospital	Jendouba Governorate	Regional	36.63716206141975°N 8.723825192473099°E	
Kesra Hospital	Siliana Governorate, Kesra	Hospital	36.05312903081431°N 9.295114262135495°E	
Mahres Regional Hospital	Sfax Governorate, Mahares	Regional	34.55859771785194°N 10.5106535921954°E	
Marsa Internal Security Forces Hospital	Tunis Governorate, La Marsa	Government	36.879069°N 10.324940°E	.
Menzel Bourguiba Regional Hospital	Bizerte Governorate	Regional	37.164368411269585°N 9.796797223906603°E	
Mohamed Bouazizi Hospital	Ben Arous Governorate, Ben Arous	Burn center hospital	36°45′0″N 10°12′36″E	
Mohammed Ben Sassi Regional Hospital	Gabès Governorate, Mtorrech	Regional	34.0973728210419°N 10.1767016992082°E	
Mongi Slim Hospital	Tunis Governorate, La Marsa	Hospital	36.867253°N 10.291239°E	
Rabta Hospital	Tunis Governorate	Hospital	36.80200018467323°N 10.154516252919517°E	.
Razi Hospital	Manouba Governorate, La Manouba	Psychiatric hospital	36.810356°N 10.082659°E	
Salim EL-Hadhri Regional Hospital	Sfax Governorate, Kerkennah Islands	Regional	34.93920653090211°N 11.110539623854569°E	
Sahloul Hospital	Sousse Governorate	University hospital	35.836529°N 10.589908°E	
Siliana Regional Hospital	Siliana Governorate, Siliana	Regional hospital	36.13963778904348°N 9.374495456032857°E	
Taher Maamouri Regional Hospital	Nabeul Governorate, Mrezga	Regional	36.437974689630565°N 10.674205868251102°E	
Tahar-Sfar University Hospital	Mahdia Governorate, Mahdia	University hospital	35.51031108212163°N 11.032674883561386°E	
Tunis Military Hospital	Tunis Governorate, Tunis	Military Hospital	36.78715937477607°N 10.178377854640587°E	
Zaghouan Regional Hospital	Zaghouan Governorate, Zaghouan	Regional	36.41653928995125°N 10.132128297086663°E	

=== Historical hospitals ===
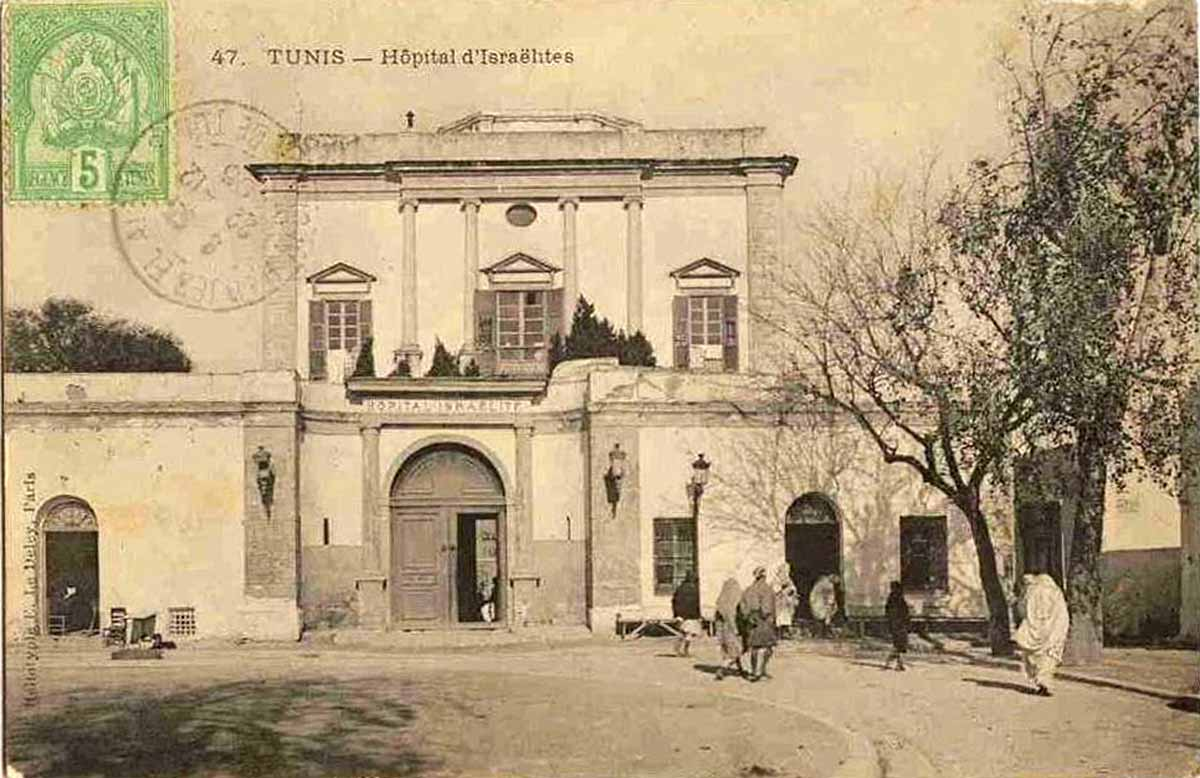
Jewish Hospital in Tunis, circa 1900

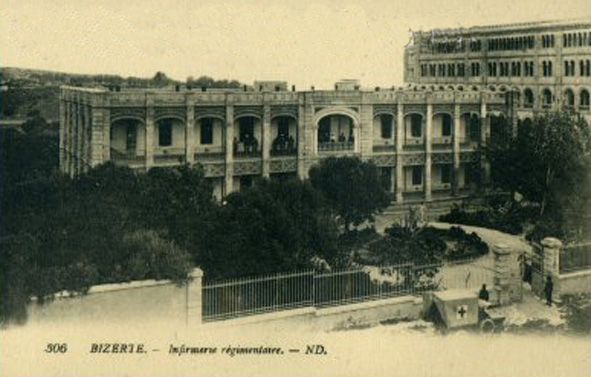
Regimental Hospital in Bezirte, historical photo

Before Tunisia was a French protectorate, it had only two health establishments: the Sadiki Hospital and the French civilian hospital. In 1881, after the establishment of the protectorate, there were only four healthcare establishments: the Belvédère Military Hospital, the French civilian hospital, the Italian colonial hospital and the Jewish hospital (1895 to 1956). As early as 1930, after the foundation of the public health and assistance directorate, the number of healthcare facilities increased and various medical services were provided. From 1950, the administrative health structures evolved in order to better manage the health needs of the time, such as the fight against epidemics–mainly malaria, smallpox and tuberculosis.

== See also ==
- French Wikipedia, Health in Tunisia
- Arabic Wikipedia, List of hospitals in Tunisia
- Health in Tunisia
