= Khelil Bouhageb =

Tunisian politician and reformer

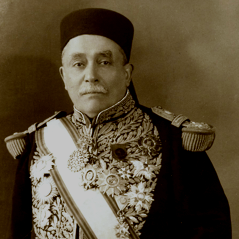

Prime Minister of Tunisia
- In office 1926–1932
- Monarchs: Muhammad VI; Ahmad II
- Preceded by: Mustapha Dinguizli
- Succeeded by: Hédi Lakhoua

Personal details
- Born: 27 August 1863 Tunis, Beylik of Tunis
- Died: 8 February 1942 (aged 78) La Marsa, French Tunisia
- Spouse: Princess Nazli Fazil (1898–1913)
- Parent: Salem Bouhageb (father)
- Relatives: Hassine Bouhageb (brother)

Khelil Bouhageb (27 August 1863 in Tunis – 8 February 1942 in La Marsa) was a Tunisian politician and reformer. He served as Prime Minister of Tunisia from 1926 to 1932, after his death of Mustapha Dinguizli. Bouhageb was the son of Sheikh Salem Bouhageb; his brother was the doctor Hassine Bouhageb.

== Biography ==
He studied at Sadiki Secondary School in Tunis and then at Saint-Louis High School in Paris. Became a member of the Khaldounia Board of Directors in 1898, he married on 5 April 1900 in Cairo, Princess Nazli Fazıl, granddaughter of Mehemet Ali.

On 22 April 1915 he became president of the Tunis court and then president of the municipality of Tunis (Sheikh El Medina) on 19 October the same year. He was appointed Minister of the Pen on 22 May 1922 and Grand Vizier of Tunis on 3 November 1926 after the death of Mustapha Dinguizli. He was sacked in 1932 by Ahmed II Bey because of his independence of mind, victim of intrigues of the Bey's entourage.

Khelil Bouhageb does not leave a descendant. He is buried with his father, Sheikh Salem Bouhageb, and his brother, Dr. Hassine Bouhageb.
