= Constance Quéniaux =

French dancer

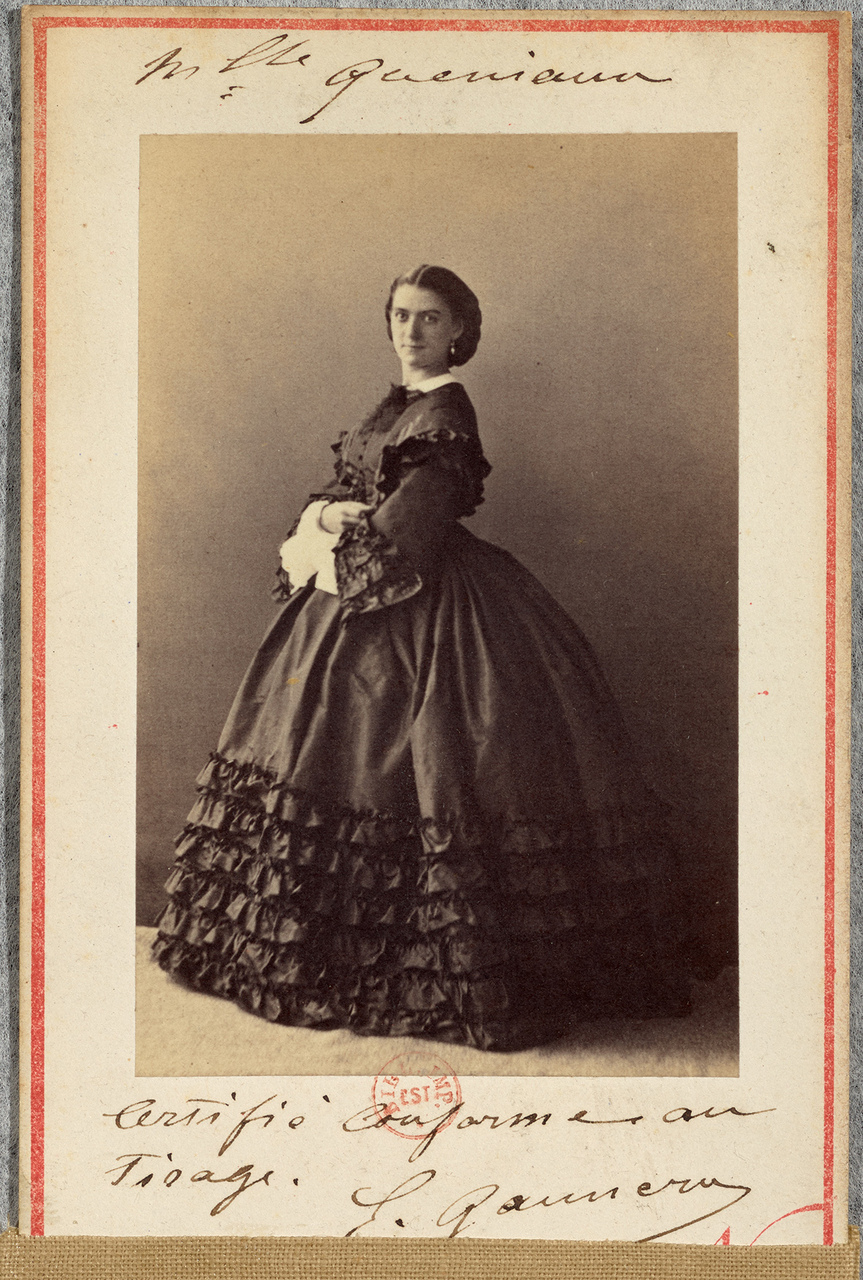
- Photograph by Nadar, 1861
- Born: Constance Adolphine Quéniaux; 9 July 1832; Saint-Quentin, Kingdom of France, July Monarchy
- Died: 7 April 1908 (aged 75); Paris, France
- Known for: Presumed model for L'Origine du monde

Constance Adolphine Quéniaux (9 July 1832 – 7 April 1908) was a dancer and courtesan at the Paris Opera Ballet. She is the presumed model for Gustave Courbet's painting L'Origine du monde, in which a woman is seen explicitly displaying her vulva.

== Life and career ==
=== Early years ===
Born on 9 July 1832 at Saint-Quentin, Constance Adolphine Quéniaux was the daughter of Marie Catherine Quéniaux. Quéniaux's mother was unmarried at the time of her birth and she reportedly grew up in poverty.

At a young age, Quéniaux joined the ballet corps of the Paris Opera Ballet, performing minor roles in its repertoire. She rose to a secondary soloist position alongside it:Claudina Cucchi, receiving acclaim. Quéniaux would combine her dance career with prostitution.

In 1859 Quéniaux had suffered from a knee injury that prevented her from continuing with her career in ballet, and by the age of 34, she had officially retired from the Opera and was captivating the favour of an Ottoman diplomat, Halil Şerif Pasha.

Quéniaux was the model for several works, including the Portrait de Mademoiselle Constance Quéniaux, de l'Académie Impériale de Musique (1867), by Jules-Émile Saintin.

=== Later life ===
In the final years of Quéniaux's life, she became renowned for her philanthropy. She began to actively support the Orphelinat des Arts—an institution for orphaned or abandoned children of artists.

She died in Paris, France, on 7 April 1908, aged 75. In her will, she left a Courbet painting of camellias. This flower, since the publication of Alexandre Dumas fils' La Dame aux Camélias had been associated with courtesans. She is known to have owned a villa in Cabourg.

== L'Origine du monde ==
Halil Şerif Pasha was a notable collector of arts. He commissioned Gustave Courbet to paint Quéniaux, whom he called his "lucky charm". The work L'Origine du monde hides the model's face. While her identity was known at the time, as Quéniaux grew respectable the information was lost. Indeed, experts long identified the model with Joanna Hiffernan, an Irish model who was Courbet's lover.

Correspondence between Alexandre Dumas and George Sand was discovered in 2018 by a French historian, Claude Schopp, referring to this painting. It mentions “One does not paint the most delicate and the most sonorous interior of Miss Queniault (sic) of the Opera.” This combined with Quéniaux's bequest of Courbet's painting of camellias (associated with courtesans) strongly suggests that Constance Quéniaux was Courbet's model.
