= Salem Bouhageb =

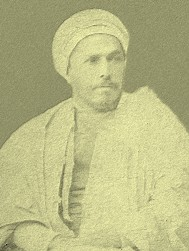
Salem Bouhageb

Salem Bouhageb (born Bembla, 1824 or 1827 – died La Marsa, July 14, 1924) was a Tunisian reformer, jurist, and poet. He was considered one of the leading Tunisian reformers of his era; among his many disciples were Béchir Sfar, Abdelaziz Thâalbi, Ali Bach Hamba, Mohamed Nakhli, Mahmoud Messadi, Mohamed Snoussi and Mohamed Tahar Ben Achour. His son Khelil Bouhageb was Prime Minister of Tunisia for a time; another son, Hassine Bouhageb, was a doctor.
