= Muhammad Sharif Pasha al-Kabir =

El Sayed Muhammad Sherif Pasha Al-Kabir (died February 13, 1865) was an Egyptian statesman. He was active during the reign of Muhammad Ali of Egypt. He was of an Albanian origin.

== Early life ==
Muhammad's father was an army officer who was killed in battle when the boy was only four months old. He was a brilliant student who caught the eye of his uncle, Muhammad Ali Pasha, the future Governor-General of Egypt, who also emerged as an Ottoman commander in Kavala. Muhammad Ali adopted El Sayed Muhammad Sherif, and when the latter was 12 years old Muhammad Ali took him to Egypt and had him educated with his own sons in an elite boarding school known as the Princes' School, which was located at El-Khanka, a city 12 miles northeast of Cairo.

== Administrative service ==
Muhammad Sherif went on to become an important administrator in Muhammad Ali's regime, serving as Wali of Damascus during the Egyptian rule in Syria from November 1832 to 1840. He also served as Finance Minister of Egypt in 1844. Upon his death, Muhammad left behind a large fortune to his sons Khalil, Ali, and Osman.

El Sayed Muhammad Sherif Pasha El-Kebir is referred to in most accounts under the abbreviated form of his name, which was Muhammad Sherif Pasha. However, he is not to be confused with Muhammad Sharif Pasha (1826-1887), a native of Kavala, who served 3 times as Prime Minister of Egypt in the 1870s and 1880s.
