= City of the Dead (Cairo) =

Cemetery in Cairo, Egypt

Historic Cairo
UNESCO World Heritage Site
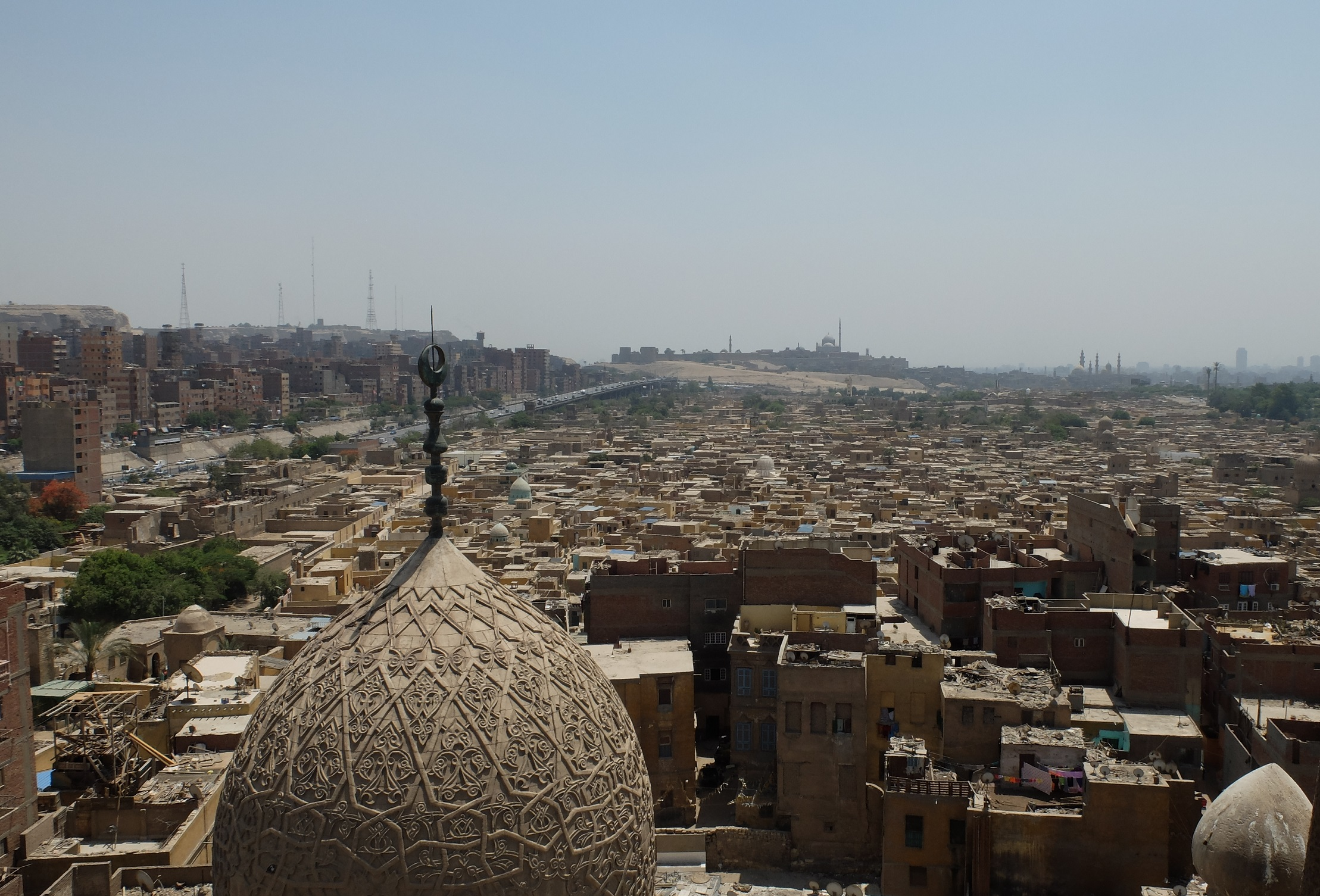
- View of the Northern Cemetery from the mosque of Qaitbay

- Location within Nile Delta
- Location: Cairo Governorate, Egypt
- Part of: Historic Cairo
- Criteria: Cultural: (i), (v), (vi)
- Reference: 89
- Inscription: 1979 (3rd Session)
- Coordinates: 30°02′48″N 31°16′35″E

The City of the Dead, or Cairo Necropolis, also referred to as the Qarāfa, (Note: Arabic: القرافة, locally [elʔɑˈrɑːfɑ]) is a series of vast Islamic-era necropolises and cemeteries in Cairo, Egypt. They extend to the north and to the south of the Cairo Citadel, below the Mokattam Hills and outside the historic city walls, covering an area roughly 4 miles (6.4 km) long. They are included in the UNESCO World Heritage Site of "Historic Cairo".

The necropolis is separated roughly into two regions: the Northern Cemetery to the north of the Citadel (also called the Eastern Cemetery or Qarafat ash-sharq in Arabic because it is east of the old city walls), and the older Southern Cemetery to the south of the Citadel. There is also another smaller cemetery north of Bab al-Nasr.

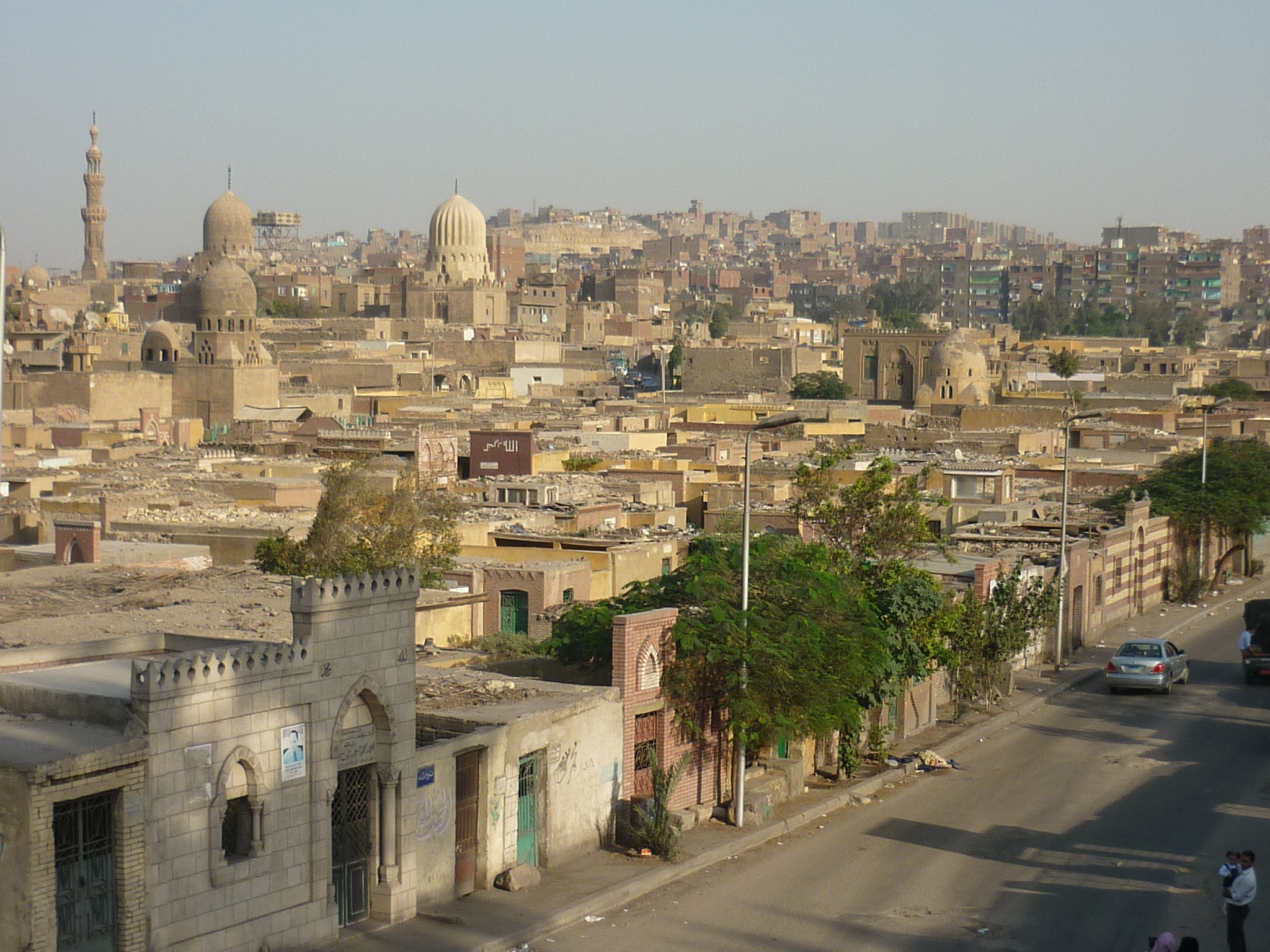
View of the Northern Cemetery. In the foreground are tomb enclosures, typically belonging to a family. In the distance (left), are the domes of medieval Mamluk mausoleums. Further in the background (and right) are the housing blocs of Manshiyat Naser rising into the Mokattam hills.

The necropolis that makes up "the City of the Dead" has been developed over many centuries and contains both the graves of Cairo's common population as well as the elaborate mausoleums of many of its historical rulers and elites. It started with the early city of Fustat (founded in 642 CE) and arguably reached its apogee, in terms of prestige and monumentality, during the Mamluk era (13th–15th centuries). Throughout their history, the necropolises were home to various types of living inhabitants as well. These included the workers whose professions were tied to the cemeteries (e.g. gravediggers, tomb custodians), the Sufis and religious scholars studying in the religious complexes built by sultans and other wealthy patrons, and the regular inhabitants of small urban settlements and villages in the area. This population grew and shrank according to circumstances in different eras. However, starting in the late 19th century and increasing in the 20th century, the pressure of Cairo's intensive urbanization and its ensuing housing shortage led to a large increase in the number of people living in the necropolis zones. Some people resorted to squatting within the mausoleums and tomb enclosures and turning them into improvised housing; however, these "tomb-dwellers" remained a small fraction of the overall population in the area. This phenomenon led to much media commentary and popular imagination about the condition of those living in the necropolises, linking them symbolically to Cairo's much-discussed overpopulation problems and sometimes leading to exaggerated estimates of the number of people squatting in the mausoleums.

Since 2020, the Egyptian government has demolished some historic tombs in the cemeteries for the purpose of building new highways and infrastructure through the area, eliciting protests and objections from locals and conservationists.

== Name and etymology ==
While the "City of the Dead" is a designation frequently used in English, the Arabic name is "al-Qarafa" (Arabic: القرافة, romanized: al-Qarafa). The name is a toponym said to derive from the Banu Qarafa ibn Ghusn ibn Wali clan, a Yemeni clan descended from the Banu Ma'afir tribe, which once had a plot of land in the city of Fustat (the predecessor of Cairo). Among other possible origins, a 13th-century Arabic Christian source suggests that the name was derived from a Greek word meaning "writer" or "copyist" (Ancient Greek: γραφευς). The land became abandoned and disused following a famine in the 11th century and was probably then used as a burial ground, which led to the name Qarafa being used to denote Cairo's urban cemeteries in general. The term appears to be specific to this context, and is not used to denote cemeteries in other places like the countryside, nor is it necessarily used in other Arabic dialects.

== History ==
=== Early history (7th–10th centuries) ===
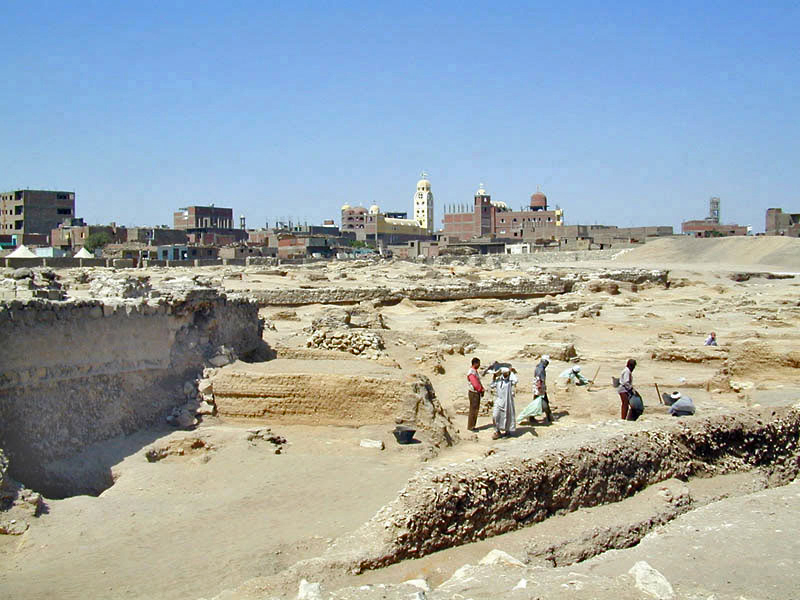
Excavated remains of the former city of Fustat near Old Cairo

The beginnings of Cairo's necropolis date back to the foundation and subsequent growth of the city of Fustat, founded in 642 CE by 'Amr ibn al-'As, the Arab Muslim commander who led the conquest of Egypt. The early Muslim city was divided into multiple khittat or plots of land that were allocated to different tribes, and each tribe in turn built their own cemetery and funerary district – often including a mosque – in the desert area to the east of the city. The area where the Mausoleum of Imam al-Shafi'i currently stands was once the cemetery of the Quraysh tribe, the tribe of the Islamic prophet Muhammad and one of the most prestigious, and this area likely lay at the center of the cemeteries which subsequently spread north and south around it. In the mid-8th century, just before the rise of the Abbasid Caliphate, the city's necropolis is said to have covered about 300 hectares, though its exact boundaries are unclear, other than the fact that it was outside the eastern city walls.

Under Abbasid rule (starting in 750 CE), the center of government shifted to a new city founded just northeast of Fustat, called al-'Askar, and then again to another city, al-Qata'i, built by the semi-independent governor Ahmad Ibn Tulun in the 9th century. The development of the necropolis thus moved northeast, mirroring these new centers of power. For example, Ibn Tulun himself was likely buried in a newly developed cemetery south of al-Qata'i (south of the still preserved Ibn Tulun Mosque), though his tomb can no longer be found today. Importantly, that area also became the site of many important tombs belonging to a number of the Prophet's descendants who emigrated to Egypt in this period, some of which, like those of Sayyida Ruqayya, Sayyida Nafisa and Sayyida Aisha, are still present today. Further south, Imam al-Shafi'i, a Sunni religious scholar of major importance and founder of the Shafi'i madhhab, was buried in the middle of the cemetery in the early 9th century on the site of the early Quraysh cemetery. His tomb became one of the most important sites in the cemeteries even up to the present day, attracting many pilgrims and spurring development in the area at different periods.

By the end of Abbasid rule in Egypt in the 10th century, the necropolis is reported to have covered an enormous area stretching several kilometers from the southern edge of al-Qata'i (close to the Mosque of Ibn Tulun and the later Citadel of Salah ad-Din) to the former lake of Birkat al-Habash (just south of the modern Ring Road today in the Basatin district). Some historians believe that the necropolis zone was divided into two cemeteries: the Qarafat al-Sughra, or "Smaller Qarafa", located further north, and the Qarafat al-Kubra, or "Greater Qarafa", spreading over a large area further south. In any case, however, these terms would be used in various ways later on.

In this early period, monumental mausoleums were quite rare, graves were unadorned, and only the most important tombs might have had some distinguishing structure at all, as early Islam discouraged ostentatious tombs. The tradition of building domed mausoleums only evolved from the Fatimid period onward.

=== Fatimid period (969–1171 CE) ===
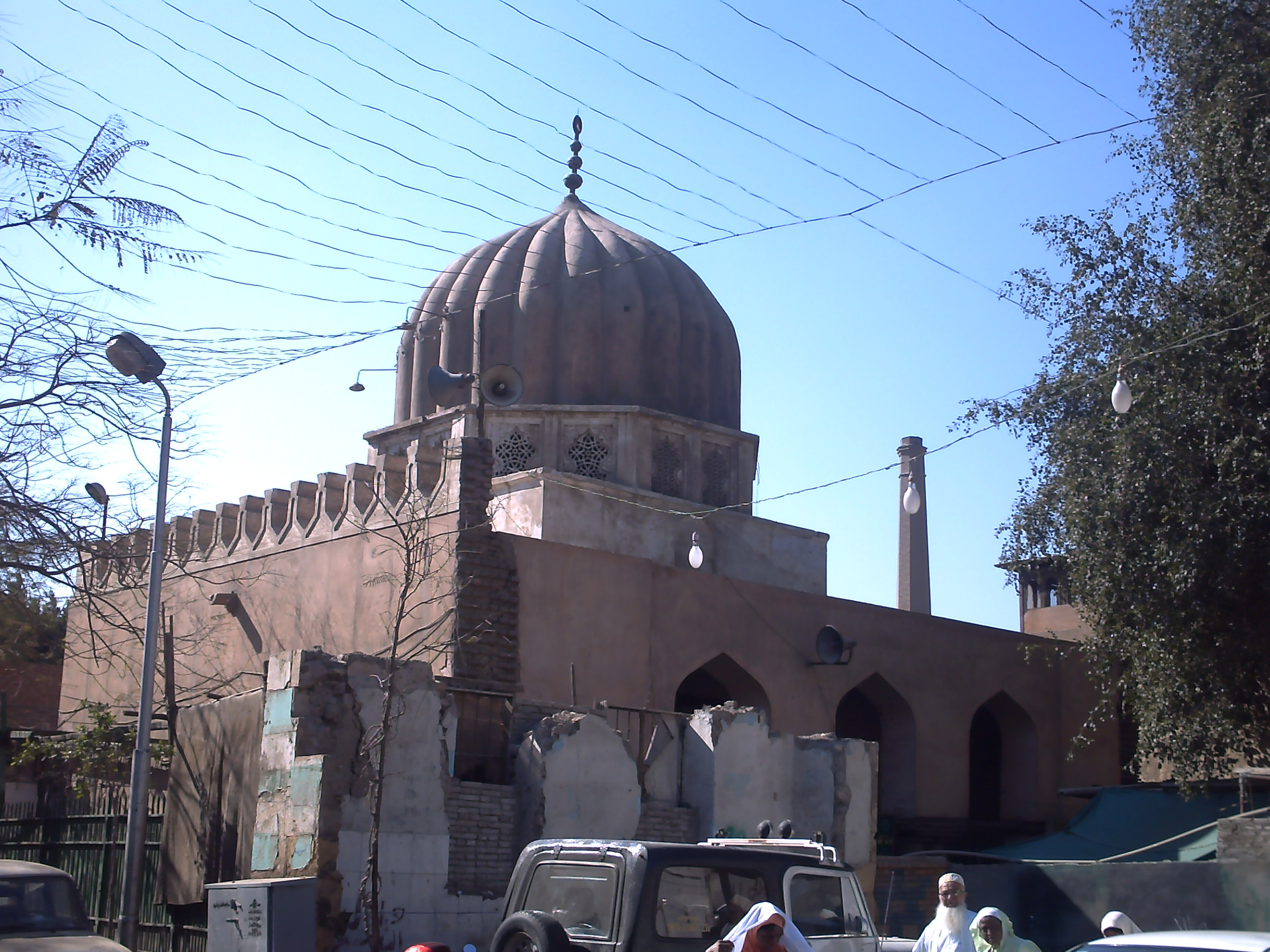
Domed mausoleum (Mashhad) of Sayyida Ruqayya, dating to Fatimid times

The Fatimid dynasty revived or reintroduced ancient Egyptian traditions of building monumental mausoleums and of visiting ancestors' graves, which subsequently changed the character of the cemeteries. One impetus for this was the presence of the tombs of a number of descendants of Muhammad and of 'Ali buried here earlier. These were especially important to the Shi'i version of Islam of which the Fatimids were adherents. The Fatimids even built three shrines which were intended to house the remains of Muhammad and of the first two Shi'a caliphs/imams, but the remains were never moved here. A number of other Fatimid-era mausoleums survive today in the area between the Mosques of Ibn Tulun and of Sayyida Nafisa, such as the Mausoleum of Sayyida Ruqayya. During this period, the name al-Qarafat al-Kubra ("Greater Qarafa") appears to have designated the vast cemeteries associated with Fustat, which may not have merged yet with the Abbasid-era cemeteries of al-'Askar and al-Qata'i.

The Fatimids built a number of palaces and residences within the Greater Qarafa cemetery and along the roads between Fustat and their new royal city of al-Qahira (from which the name "Cairo" originates) to the northeast. These did not supplant the Great Palaces (located on the site of Bayn al-Qasrayn today), but served as leisurely retreats from the city and as places to stay while visiting the tombs of Muhammad's descendants. Along with their palaces, the Fatimids also built mosques, madrasas, and ribats for religious instruction and activities, all of which required the creation of infrastructure for water and other necessities. Among other measures, the Aqueduct of Ibn Tulun, built to provide water to al-Qata'i and passing through this area, was repaired. The most important of the constructions in the Qarafa appears to have been a monumental palace complex called "al-Andalus", built in 977 by Durzan (or Taghrid), the mother of Caliph al-'Aziz. Caliph al-Amir (reigned 1100–1130) also reportedly resided in the palace. Durzan also built a large mosque, possibly comparable in size and layout to the Mosque of al-Azhar, described by contemporary chroniclers and known simply as the Qarafa Mosque. The palace was later destroyed by Salah ad-Din and the mosque is no longer extant today.

These developments and practices during the Fatimid era led to the emergence, or resurgence, of the popular traditions of visiting the graves of family members and ancestors for holidays and vacations. It also set a precedent for people living in the cemeteries, as the new establishments inside the Qarafa required workers to operate, and the religious foundations attracted scholars and Sufis.

The Fatimid Caliphs themselves and their family members were buried in their own mausoleum (called Turbat az-Za'faran) on the site of what is now Khan al-Khalili, inside the city and adjacent to the Fatimid Great Palaces. However, many Fatimid officials and elites chose to be buried in the Qarafa. The presence of Taghrid's palace and mosque may have encouraged them to be buried here alongside the rest of Fustat's population. Elsewhere, the Bab al-Nasr Cemetery, located just across from the Bab al-Nasr city gate, was also likely established in this period, probably starting with the powerful Fatimid vizier Badr al-Jamali (who built the gate and the city walls) choosing to be buried here when he died in 1094.

Towards the end of the Fatimid period, the necropolis may have declined as the political situation worsened. The burning of Fustat in 1168 led to the decline of that city and its importance, and the ruined sections of the city may have become burial grounds integrated into the Greater Qarafa.

=== Ayyubid period (1171–1250 CE) ===
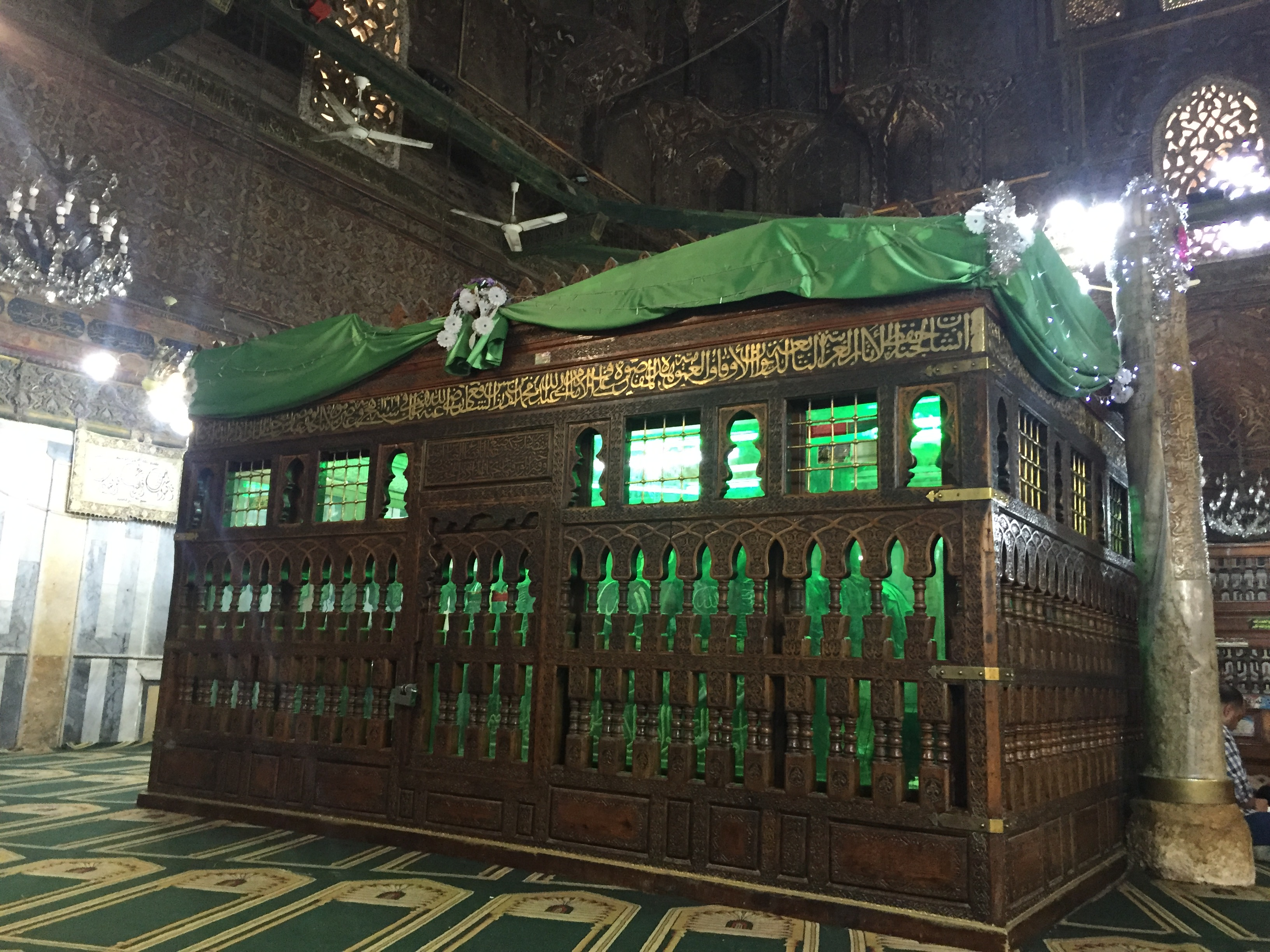
The tomb of Imam al-Shafi'i today. The mausoleum dates from the Ayyubid period but was restored many times since.

The Qarafa received new attention under the Ayyubid dynasty (established by Salah ad-Din after the Fatimid Caliphate was abolished in 1171), who repaired some monuments and aqueducts and re-initiated urbanization in parts of the cemeteries (despite also destroying Fatimid monuments). Most significantly, Salah ad-Din built the first Sunni madrasa in Egypt (to counter Fatimid Shi'a influence), based on the Shafi'i madhhab, right next to the tomb of Imam al-Shafi'i, while in 1211 Sultan al-Malik al-Kamil built the mausoleum and enormous dome over al-Shafi'i's tomb which remains one of the most impressive in Cairo to this day.

The development and construction around Imam al-Shafi'i's mausoleum led to this area becoming a miniature district of its own, known as al-Qarafat al-Sughra (the "Smaller Qarafa") within the larger necropolis still known as al-Qarafat al-Kubra (the "Greater Qarafa"), which was perhaps relatively dilapidated by then. The two would later merge again as development spread to other areas.

=== Mamluk period (1250–1517 CE) ===
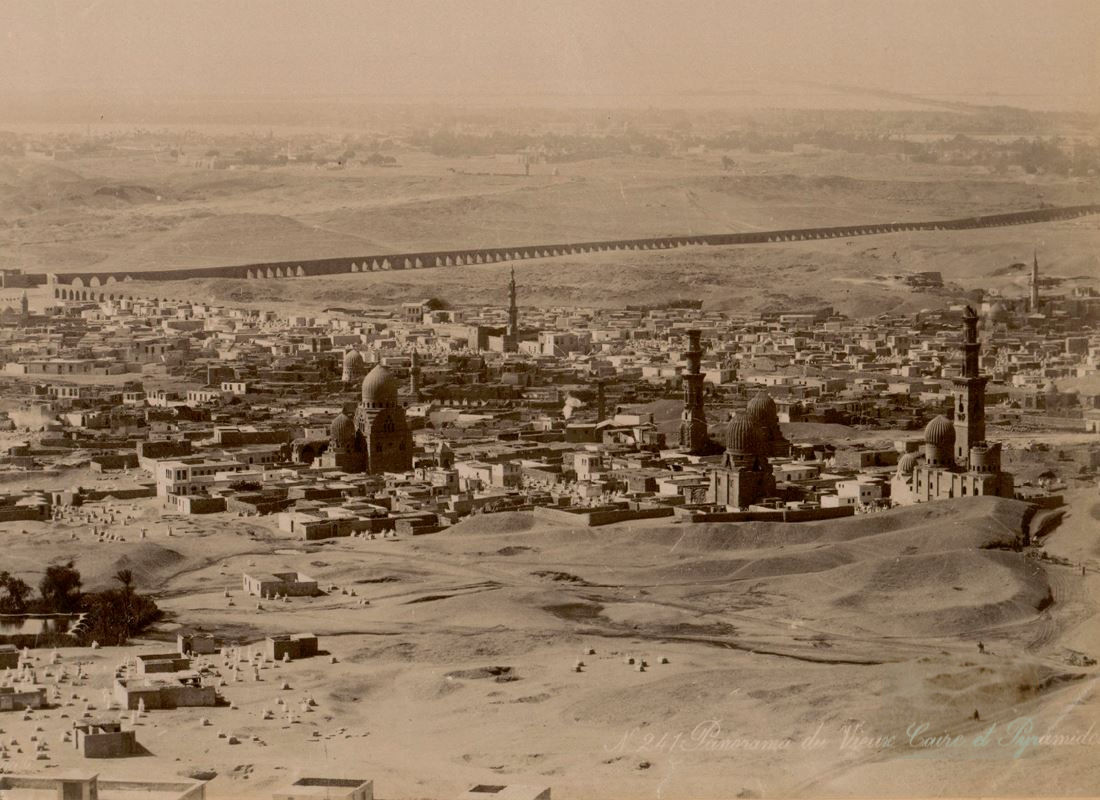
The Southern Cemetery, near the Citadel. Various Mamluk mausoleum complexes are visible, as is the Citadel Aqueduct in the background.(Photograph from 1890)

The Mamluk sultans (1250 to 1517) were prolific builders, but most of the sultans and Mamluk elites preferred to be buried in monumental mausoleums attached to mosques and madrasas built in the city rather than in the Qarafa. In 1290, they established a new cemetery just south of the Citadel, east of the existing cemetery around the tomb of Sayyida Nafisa, on land formerly used for military training and exercises. Only a relatively modest number of Mamluk funerary monuments were built here, although they were of high architectural quality and some remain today. The most significant foundation here appears to have been the Zawiya of Shaykh Zayn al-Din Yusuf in 1299, which attracted pilgrims and formed the core of a new habitable district which later became the neighbourhood of al-Qadiriya.

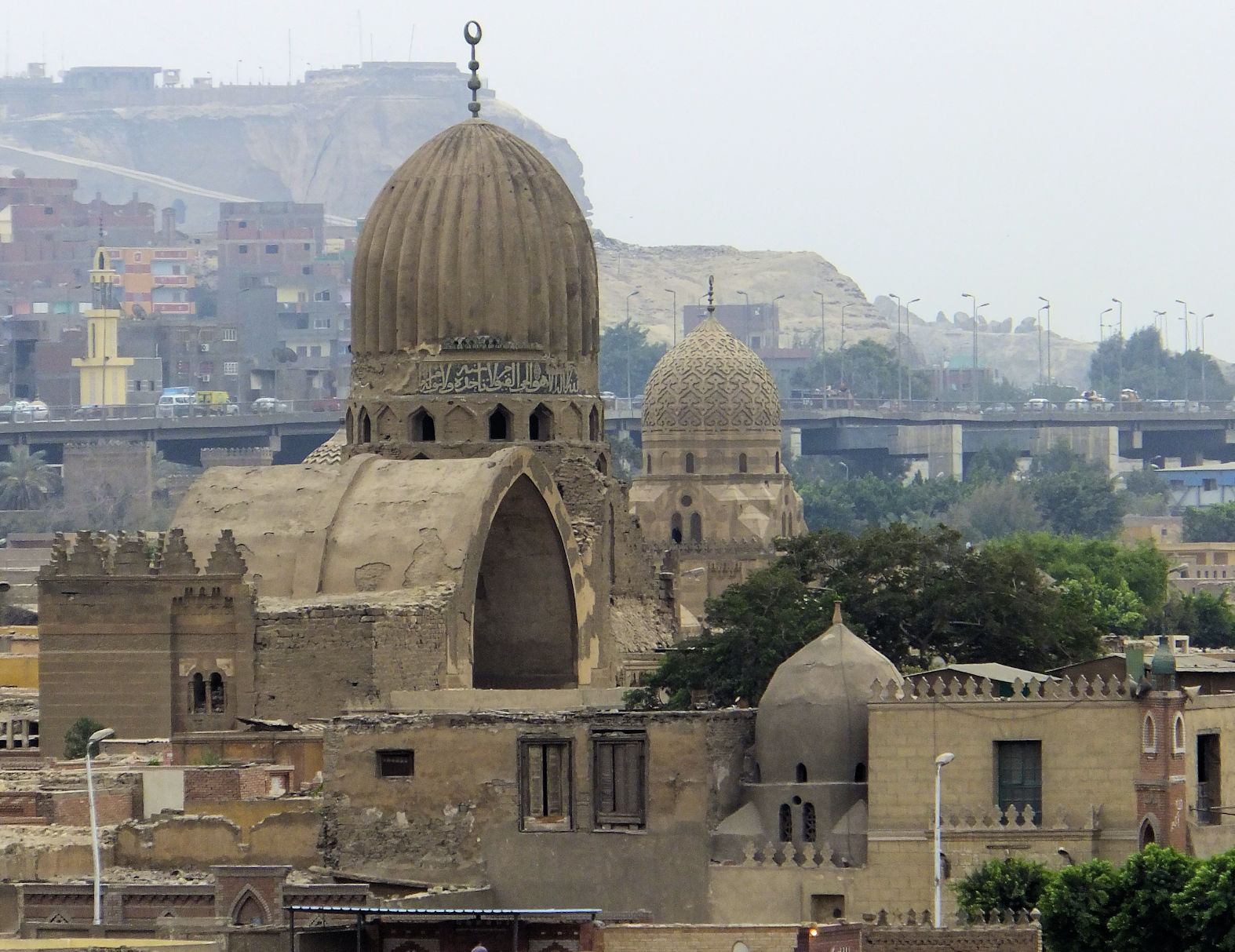
The Mausoleum and Khanqah of Khawand Tughay (or Umm Anuk), the wife of al-Nasir Muhammad, built before 1348 in the Northern Cemetery

Under the long reign of Sultan al-Nasir Muhammad (1293–1341), Cairo's prosperity led to increased use of the Qarafa necropolis and to its revitalization, with the "Smaller Qarafa" of Ayyubid times (around the Mausoleum of Imam al-Shafi'i) now re-merging with the "Greater Qarafa". This period marked the height of Cairo's wealth and power, and in turn probably marked the high point of the Qarafa in terms of prestige and splendor.

In the later 14th century Cairo's population declined significantly due to the arrival of the plague. Despite the disasters, Mamluk elites continued to build extensively across Cairo. The focus of development, however, shifted from the old Qarafa, which was by then fully saturated, to new areas of development north of the Citadel, which later became what is now known as the Northern Cemetery. This desert area located between the Citadel, the city walls, and the Mokattam hills was crossed by the important pilgrimage road which led to Mecca. The road grew in importance during the Mamluk period as the Mamluks' military dominance in the region ensured the safety of the pilgrimage route. The road was dotted by buildings such as caravanserais, restaurants and stables which serviced travelers. Starting in 1265, Sultan Baybars turned the area into a large hippodrome for equestrian games, training, and military parades, and it became known as Maydan al-Qabaq. In 1320, Sultan al-Nasir Muhammad put an end to the games and the military functions of the area were abandoned, but it came to be inhabited by Sufi orders searching for space outside the crowded city. In turn, the Mamluks began to build their mausoleums here, also looking for more space. The Bahri Mamluks built some funerary structures here, most notably the mausoleum of Princess Tughay (also known as Umm Anuk), al-Nasir Muhammad's favourite wife, who was buried here in 1348, making it one of the earliest surviving structures in the Northern Cemetery today. Her mausoleum was accompanied by a khanqah for Sufis, which became a recurring architectural format for future funerary complexes.

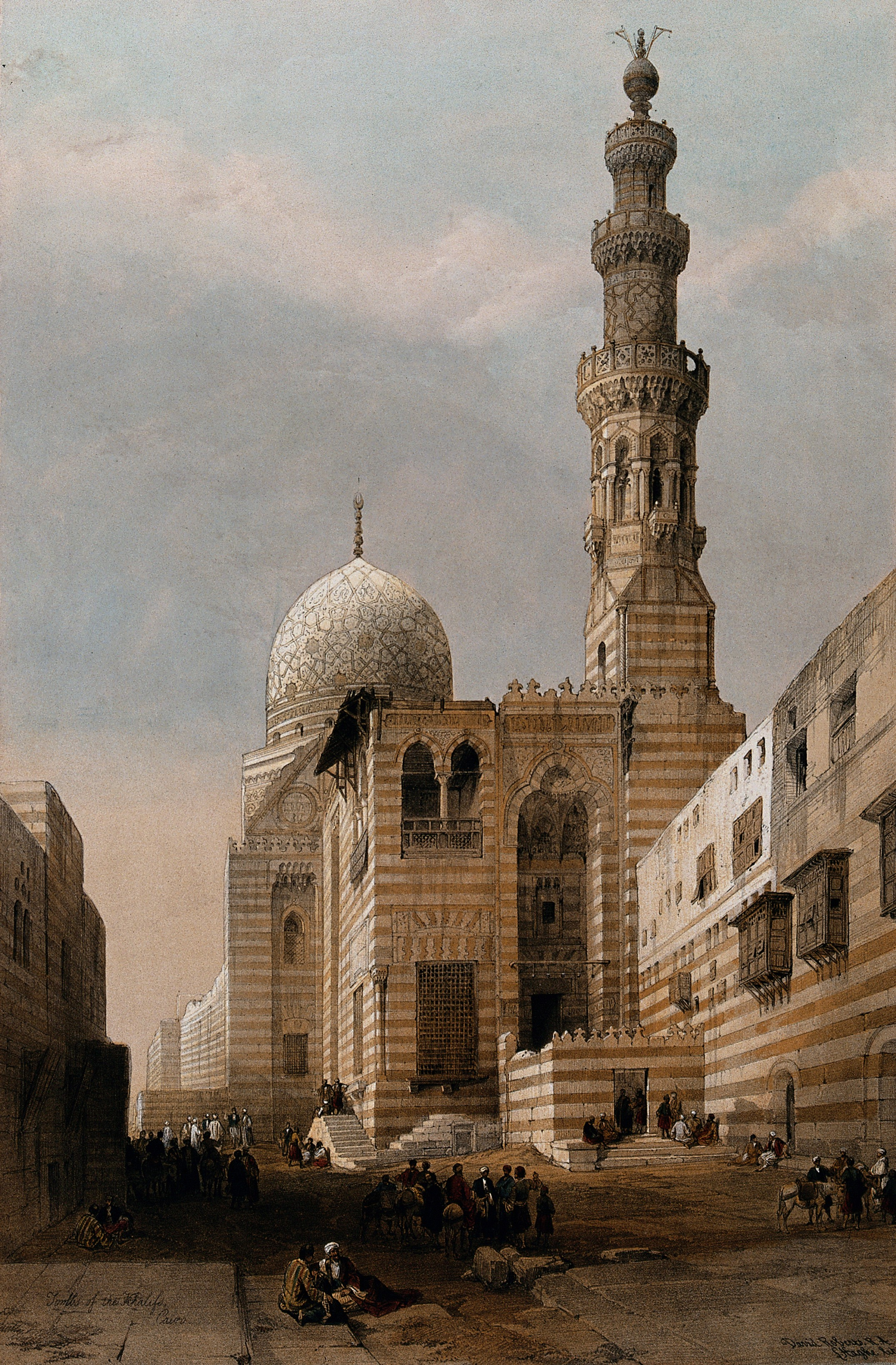
The funerary complex of Sultan Qaytbay (in a lithograph from 1848)

It was the Burji or Circassian Mamluks, however, who contributed the most and in their time the new Northern Cemetery came to surpass the old Southern Cemetery (the old Qarafat al-Kubra) in terms of splendor. As elsewhere in the city, their monuments were typically a combination of mausoleum, mosque, madrasa, khanqah and other functions. However, here they were able to build much larger complexes spread over a wider area. Many historians believe that the scale and nature of the constructions point to deliberate efforts at urbanizing the area, rather than simply using it as another necropolis. The funerary complex of Sultan Qaytbay, for example, considered a masterpiece of Mamluk architecture, is often described as a "royal suburb", since it included a host of services and establishments to serve both short-term stays and long-term residents. The population of the cemetery in the mid-15th century is estimated to have been around four thousand people.

The Bab al-Wazir Cemetery, just north of the Citadel walls and south of the main Northern Cemetery, also dates from the Mamluk period. Starting in 1348, a number of Mamluk amirs built mausoleums and religious foundations in this area, forming another small necropolis still visible today, though it did not blend with the rest of the Northern Cemetery until later.

By the end of the Mamluk period in the 16th century, the decline of Cairo's population and wealth also led to the decline of the necropolis zones overall, particularly the old southern Qarafa. Many of the waqf trusts, which governed the functioning and upkeep of the religious foundations built throughout Cairo, and its necropolis were embezzled so as to appropriate their revenues. During the plague years in the 15th century, the authorities at one point officially banned people from living in the Qarafa, which left many structures unguarded and vulnerable to looting. Nonetheless, in the early 16th century, Leo Africanus describes the old Qarafa (the Southern Cemetery), as being inhabited by around two thousand households.

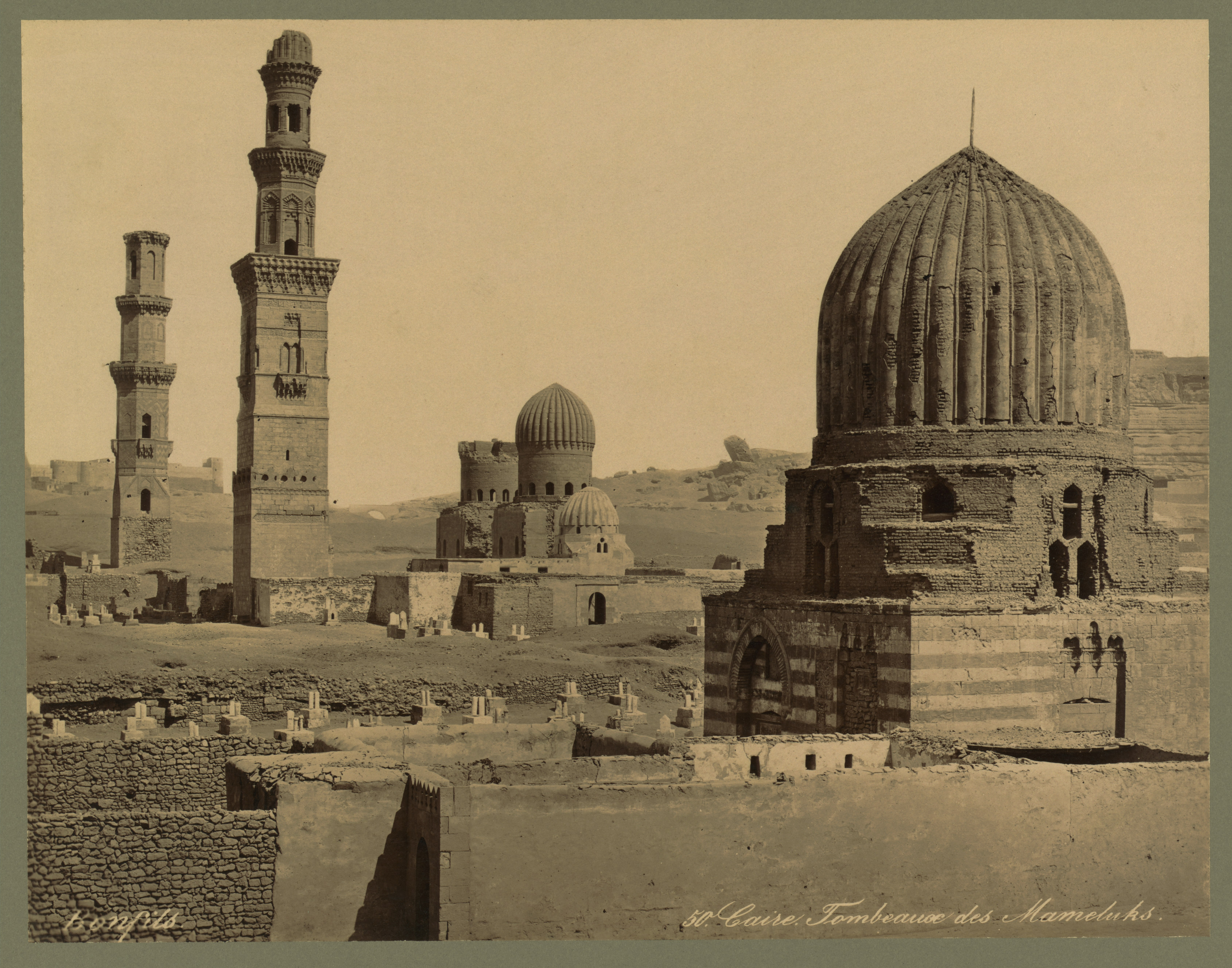
Mamluk funerary architecture in the Southern Cemetery, circa 1867

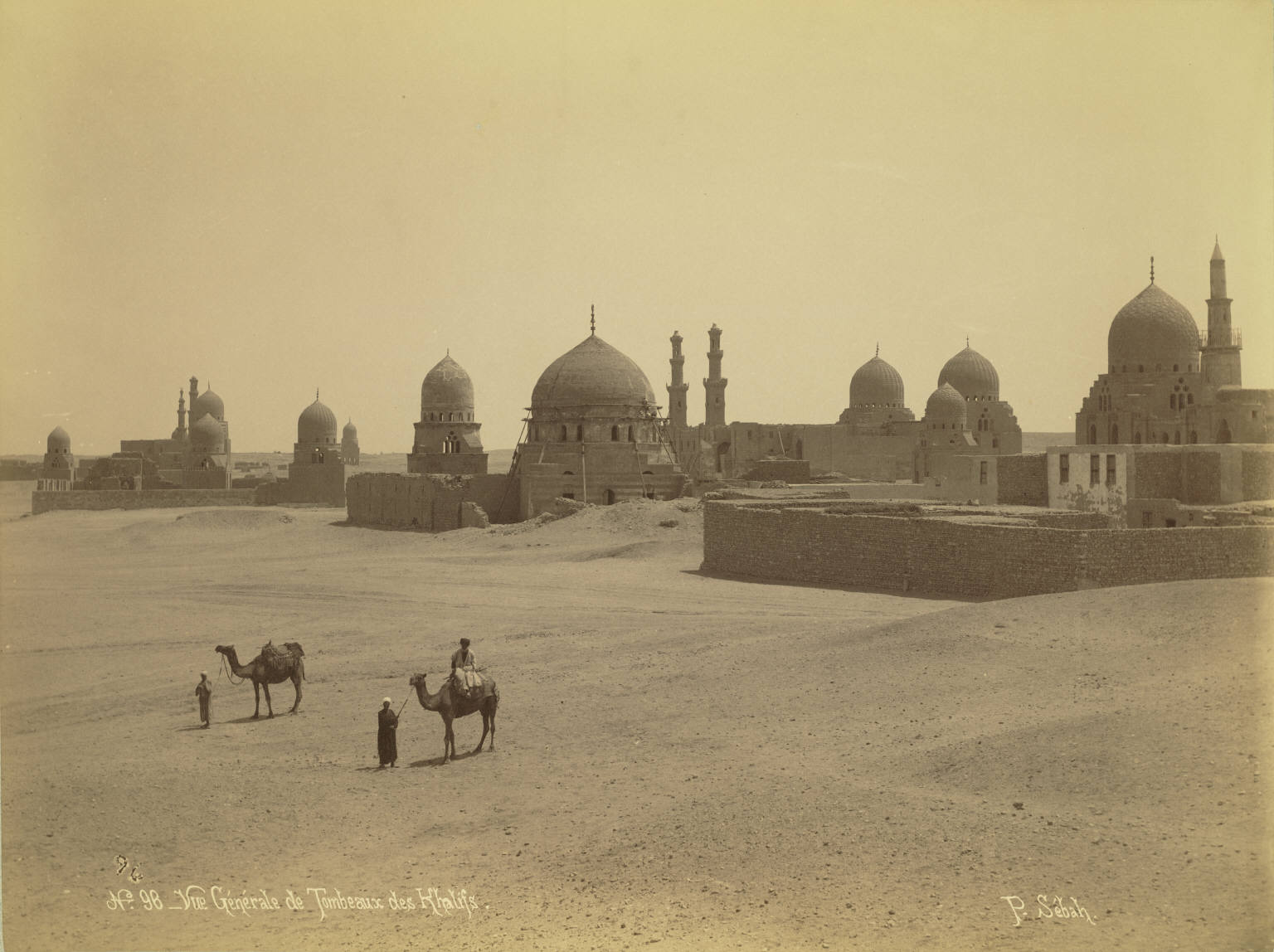
Mamluk funerary architecture in the Northern Cemetery, circa 1860

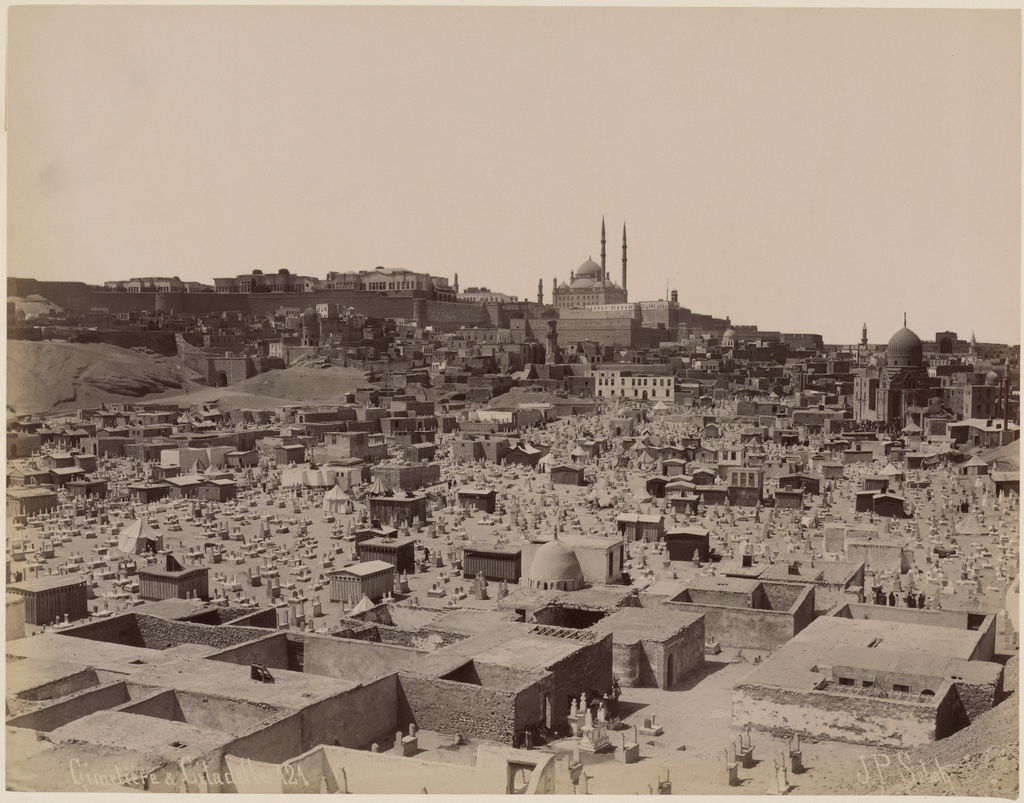
Bab al-Wazir Cemetery, photographed late 19th century

=== Ottoman rule and Khedival period (16th–19th centuries) ===
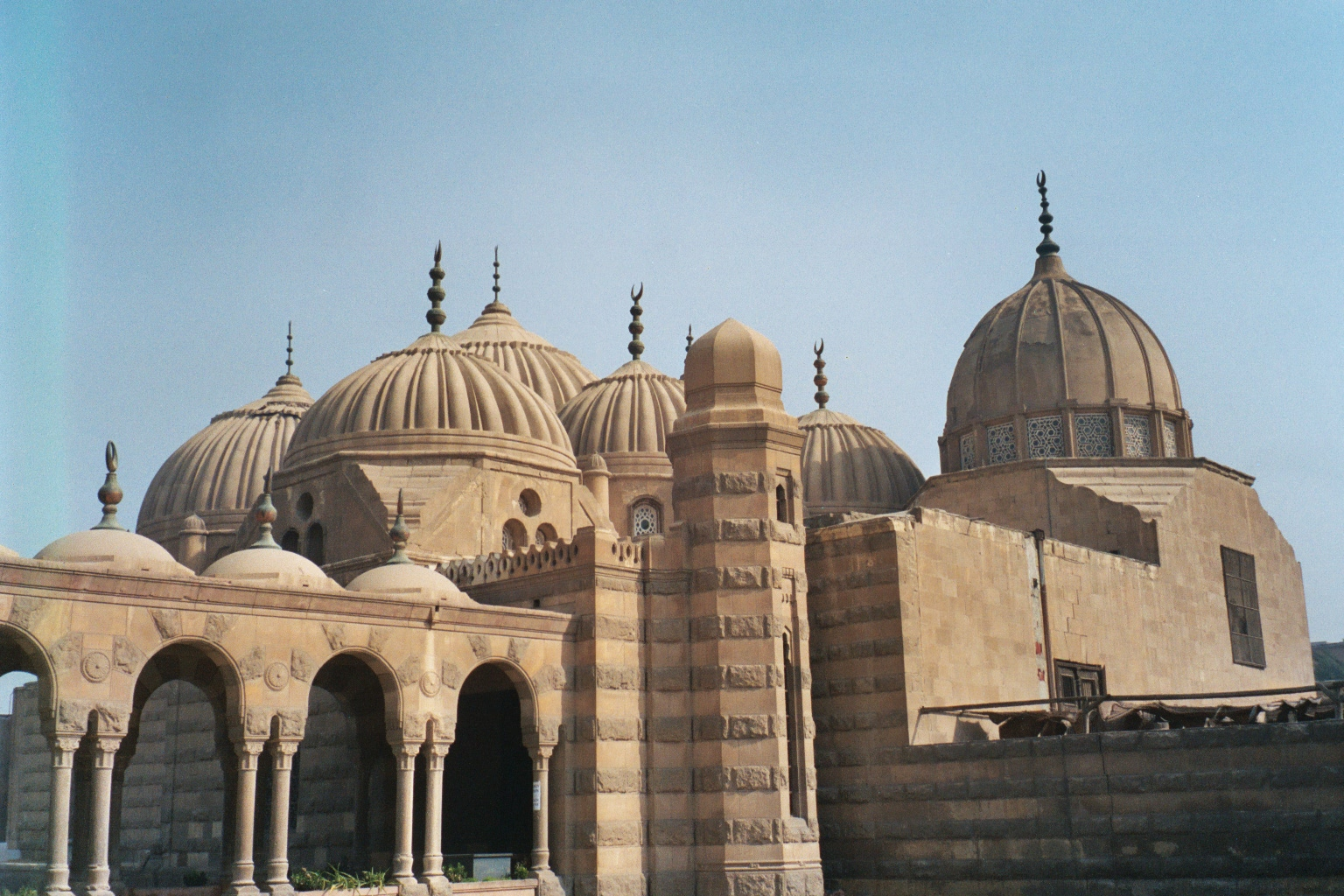
Exterior of the Hosh al-Basha, the mausoleum of the family of Muhammad Ali, begun in 1854

Under Ottoman rule (1517–1798), Egypt became a province of a vast empire with Istanbul as its capital. During the following three centuries Egypt was ruled by pashas, governors appointed by the Ottoman sultan. The province was highly important to the empire for its agricultural and financial support, and governors were often appointed from the highest circles of the Sultan's regime. However, governors were typically appointed for a few years before being recalled because the sultans were afraid of them accumulating power. One hundred and ten pashas held the office during this period and many ended their terms in jail or under house arrest. Because of their short terms and other challenges in governing, the pashas were financially and politically weakened. Only a small number of them left any monument attesting to their time in Egypt, and only six such monuments were in the Qarafa. Even the mamluks (who remained as a political elite under Ottoman rule) did not build many new monuments in the cemeteries at this time, although many zawiyas and religious buildings were maintained and repaired. The population of the cemeteries declined throughout the Ottoman period, but the necropolises nonetheless remained an important part of Cairo, with many foreign visitors during this period commenting on their size and monumental quality.

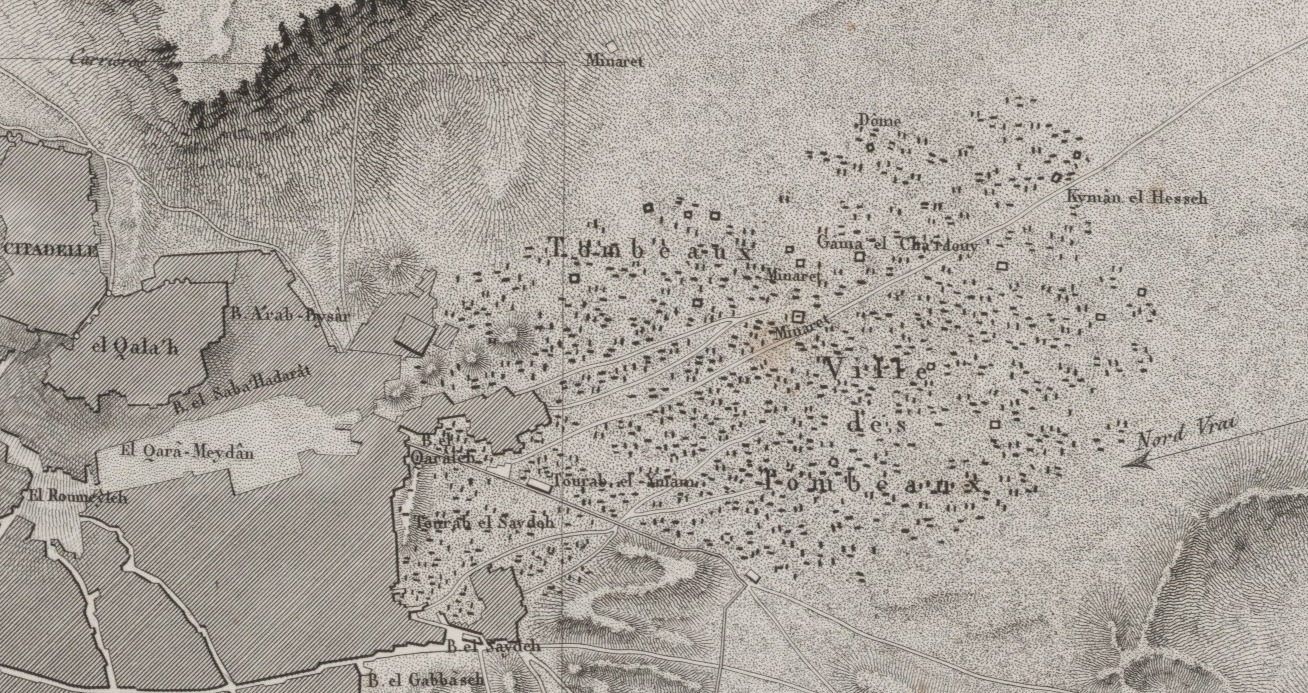
Map of the City of the Dead (Southern cemetery) in c.1800 from Description de l'Égypte – in French it was labelled Ville des tombeaux (Town of the Tombs)

Ottoman rule was suddenly ended by Napoleon Bonaparte's invasion of Egypt in 1798. The French, citing hygiene reasons, banned all burials inside the city, and cemeteries within the city walls were eventually destroyed and the remains of their occupants moved, leaving only the Qarafa (which was outside the city walls) as Cairo's major burial ground. After the brief French occupation, Muhammad 'Ali, an Ottoman pasha sent from Istanbul to restore order in 1805, established his own ruling dynasty over Egypt. He and his successors, as Khedives, strove to modernize Egypt and enacted many reforms. This included efforts to restrict the use of the cemeteries to burials and funerals only, and discouraging living inhabitants from settling within them. The regime also taxed waqfs, which reduced the ability of those who managed them to pay for the upkeep of the monuments.

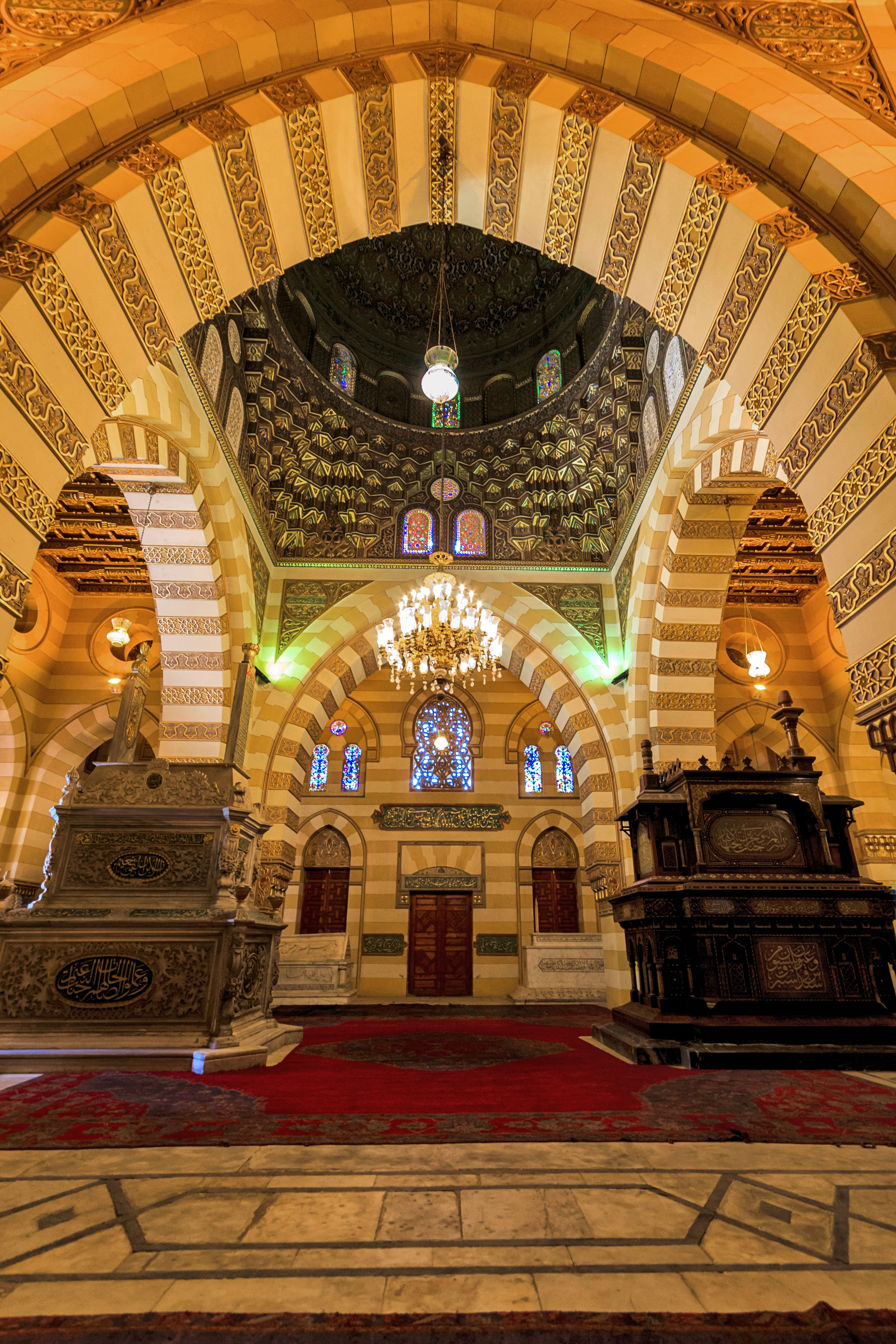
Interior of the Qubbat Afandina, a royal mausoleum built in a Neo-Mamluk style in 1894

Despite this, the necropolises received renewed attention in the 19th century and onward. The family of Muhammad Ali himself were buried in a lavish mausoleum known as the Hosh el-Pasha, built around 1854 near the Mausoleum of Imam al-Shafi'i. Perhaps following this example, many elites, royal officials, and members of the bourgeoisie began to once again build ornate mausoleums and funerary compounds in the Qarafa cemeteries. These new establishments, like the old Mamluk ones, included various services which required the constant presence of workers and, by extension, the provision of housing for them. As a result, the cemeteries began to be repopulated in the 19th century, despite the authorities' changing attitudes to urban planning.

=== Recent history (20th century to present day) ===
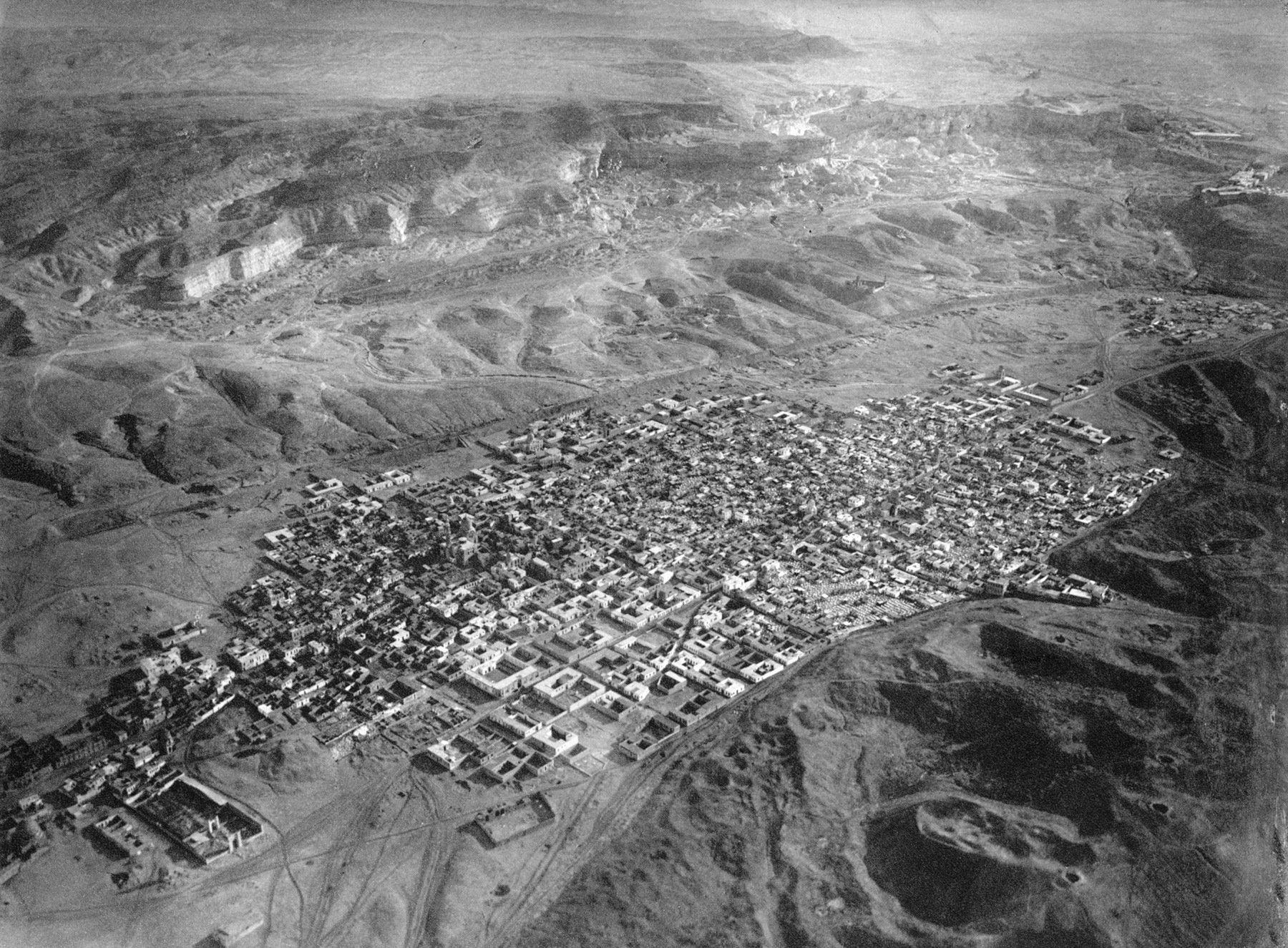
City of the Dead, the Northern Cemetery, in 1904 by Eduard Spelterini

By the end of the 19th century, however, the housing problems of Cairo began to be felt. Modernization efforts led to the demolition of many old buildings in the historic districts of the city, displacing much of the poor and working class towards the outskirts of the city. Moreover, rural migration towards the cities began to rise significantly (and would only increase over the 20th century). In 1897 the census put the population of the districts which included the cemeteries at 30,969 (though this may have included some regular neighbourhoods too, given the difficulty in defining the boundaries of the cemeteries).

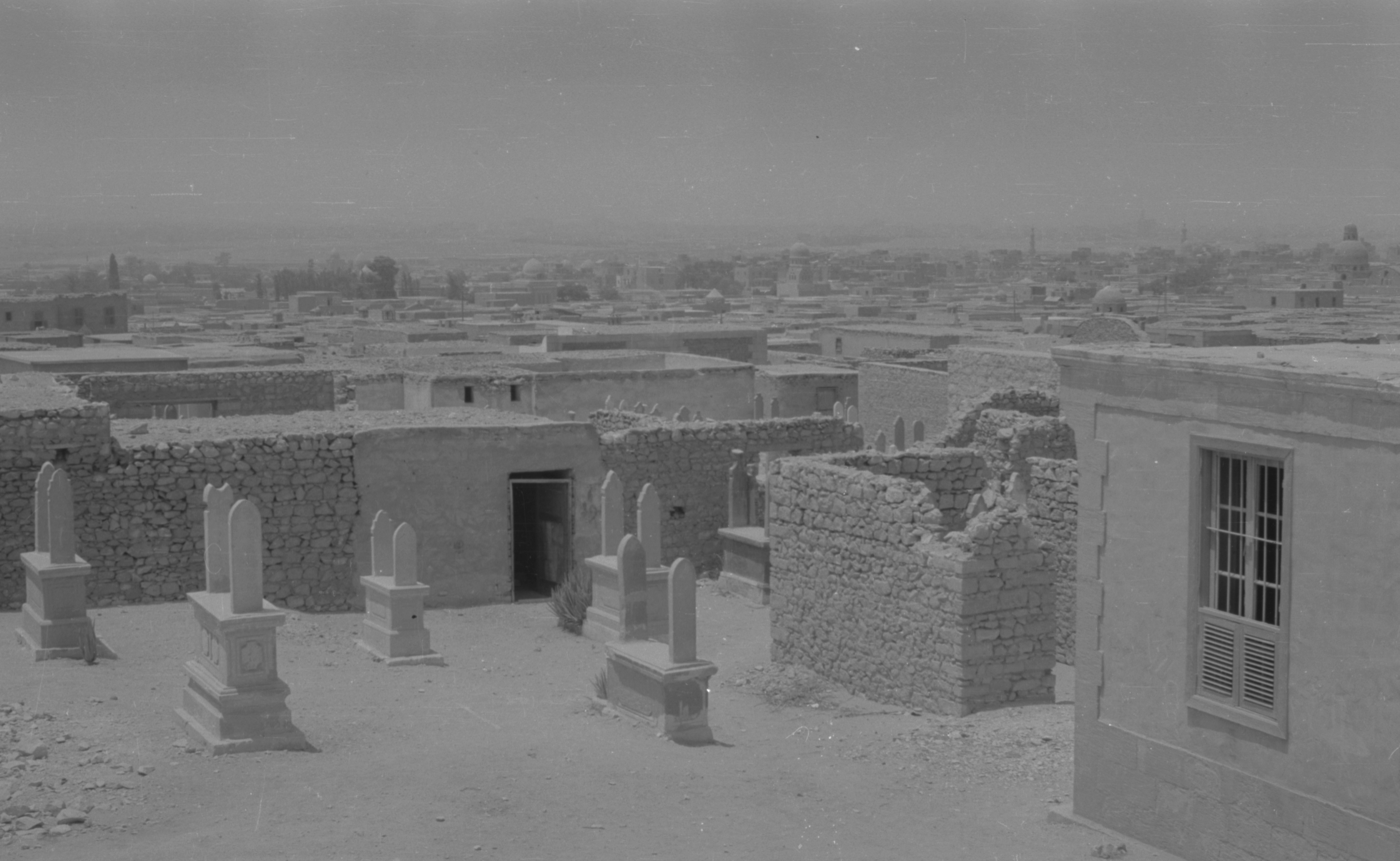
The City of the Dead in 1955

In some areas of the Qarafa, particularly the Imam al-Shafi'i district, permanent habitation for the living was less frowned upon and even received some help from the government. In 1907, the neighbourhood of Imam al-Shafi'i was connected to the rest of Cairo by a streetcar line which stretched from here to the Pyramids in Giza (though it no longer exists today). Later, during Nasser's presidency in the 1960s, the government even built public housing on the edge of the Imam al-Shafi'i neighbourhood to house some of the people displaced by the construction of the Salah Salem highway, and some schools were also built. (The construction of the Salah Salem highway, however, also implicated the destruction of some of the cemeteries along the edge of the Northern Cemetery.) By 1947, the census had calculated the population of the districts including the cemeteries at 69,367, with population density having increased by a large factor.

During the second half of the 20th century, rapid urbanization and the modernization of industries in and around Cairo lead to a massive migration that the city was ill-equipped to handle. The intensified urbanization of Cairo itself, and the exclusion of the poorest from government initiatives, resulted in a more urgent need for informal or improvised housing. Just as elsewhere in Cairo, this involved the construction of unofficial housing without government approval in areas where people could find space to build – or where they were able to demolish or incorporate older structures. Moreover, the cemeteries were already filled with structures built to house family tombs – some of them quite sumptuous – which were well-suited to provide improvised housing for the homeless and displaced. In 1966 the government banned anyone from staying in the cemeteries after sundown, but were unable to enforce this. The destruction of the 1992 Cairo earthquake was another instance that forced many people to move into family tombs, thus adding to the number of people already living in the City of the Dead.

The phenomenon of "tomb-dwellers" (people squatting in tombs because of displacement or lack of housing in the city) probably peaked in the 1980s, when they are estimated to have been around 6,000 in number. These squatters were still a very small fraction of the total population of the cemetery zones: around 3% of nearly 180,000 people at that time. The tombs themselves were often a better alternative to squatting or low-quality housing in the inner city, as they provided already-built structures with relatively ample room, although with little access to amenities.

In the 21st century, living conditions have slowly improved with greater access to running water and electricity, while the denser neighborhoods are serviced by facilities like a medical center, schools, and a post office.

== Geography and description ==
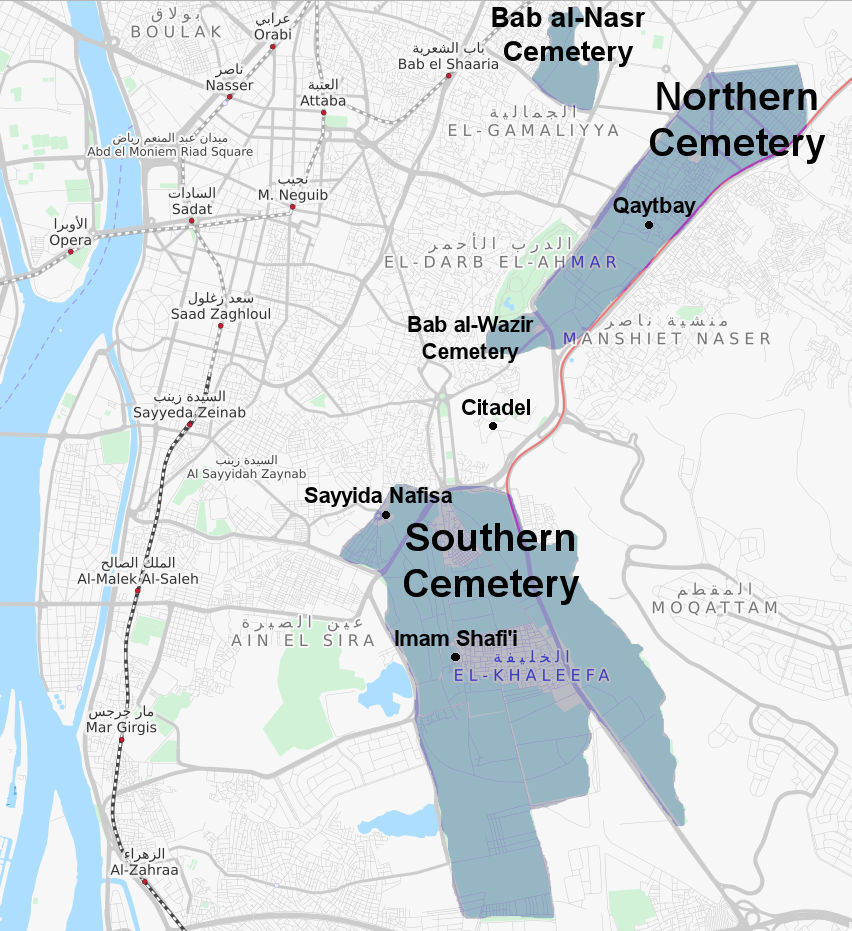
Map of the main areas and key locations of the Qarafa necropolis, within Cairo

The City of the Dead consists of a long belt of cemeteries and mausoleums stretching for roughly 4 miles (6.4 km) along the eastern edge of the historic city. It is divided into two parts by the Citadel of Cairo: the "Southern" Cemetery and "Northern" Cemetery, referring to the regions south and north of the Citadel. East of the cemeteries rise the Mokattam hills, which historically blocked their expansion in that direction. North of the historic city is also the Bab al-Nasr Cemetery, named after the northern city gate, which covers a much smaller area than the other two.

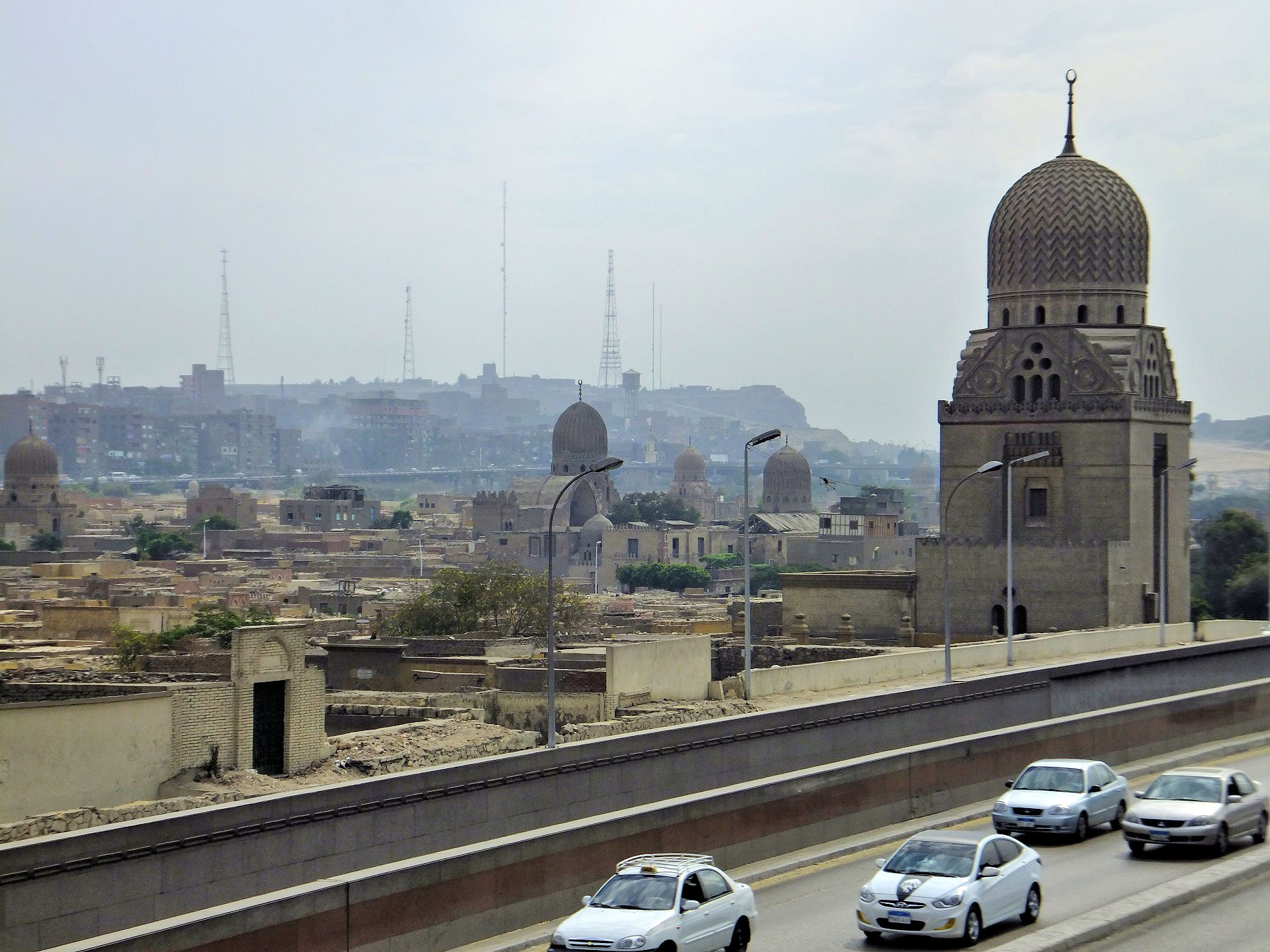
View of the Northern Cemetery today from the Salah Salem road, including the mausoleum of Ahmed Hassanein Pacha (d. 1946) on the right and the Mokattam hills in the distance

The cemeteries are located in what were arid desert areas outside the main city and just outside the traditional floodplains of the Nile. These lands were not normally suitable for habitation but their dry desert soil promoted the natural desiccation of bodies, thus preserving them for longer and ensuring a more hygienic interment of bodies overall. In modern times, the City of the Dead has been surrounded by the urban fabric of greater Cairo, which has long since outgrown its historic core. Some areas of dense urban housing have developed at several sites within the boundaries of the historic necropolis, forming their own city neighborhoods. Today, the cemeteries are also crossed and split by rail lines and major roads such as the ring roads of Shari'a Salah Salem and Kobri Al Ebageah, thus creating prominent barriers between parts of the necropolis that were once contiguous with each other.

The cemeteries are filled with a vast number of tombs dating from various periods up to the modern day. Tombs from the same family are often grouped together and enclosed in a walled structure or courtyard known as a hawsh or hosh (Arabic: حوش; which also has a generic architectural meaning). The necropolises also contain a large number of monumental mausoleums and funerary complexes that house the tombs of various Islamic saints, scholars, important state officials, and Egyptian rulers and their families, making them an important repository of historic architectural heritage in Cairo.

=== Southern Cemetery ===
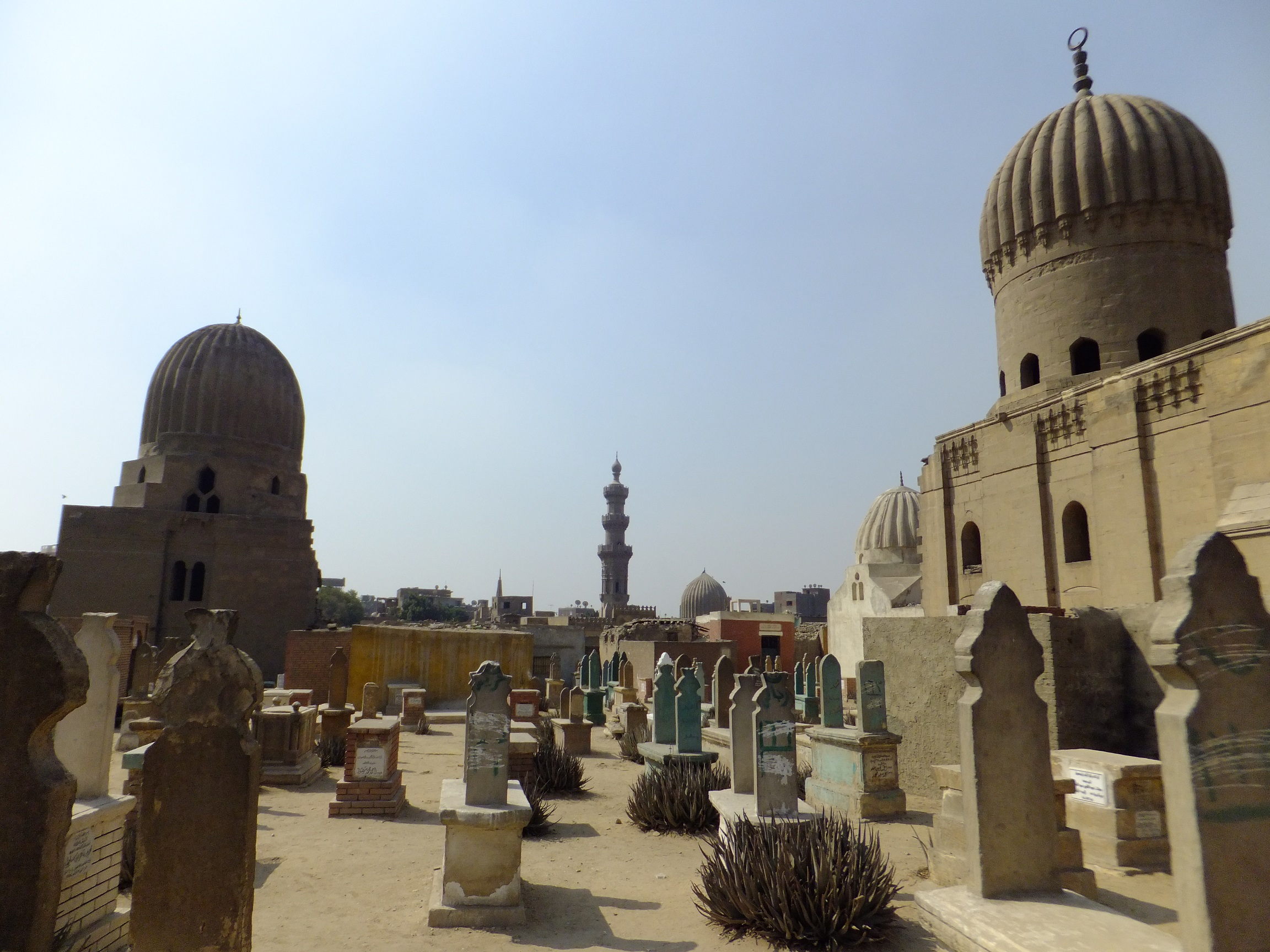
Southern Cemetery, near the Citadel, interspersed with Mamluk-era monuments (the Sultaniyya Mausoleum, right, and the mausoleum of Amir Qawsun, left)

The Southern Cemetery (also known as the "Greater Qarafa", "Qarafat al-Kubra", or simply "the Qarafa") is the largest and oldest necropolis. It is a vast area of tombs stretching from the foot of the Cairo Citadel in the north to the densely inhabited modern district of al-Basatin to the south. Its origins date back to the foundation of Fustat, the first Muslim city and capital of Egypt, established in 642 CE. The cemetery's original site was probably just east of Fustat (near the Mausoleum of Imam al-Shafi'i), and expanded from there, with the focus of development shifting to different areas in different periods. A densely inhabited urban neighborhood exists east of the Imam al-Shafi'i complex and is generally known by the same name, while another urban bloc, al-Qadiriya, exists directly south of the Sayyida Aisha Mosque and the former gate of Bab al-Qarafa. North of this, the cemeteries around the Sayyida Nafisa Mosque are separated from the rest of the necropolis by the modern Salah Salem ring road, and form the neighbourhood of al-Khalifa which blends into the main urban fabric of Cairo at this point. A part of the Mamluk Aqueduct which once provided water to the Citadel runs through the northern areas of the cemetery, partly along the path of the old Ayyubid city walls and running parallel to Salah Salem road.

The Southern Cemetery is located within the al-Khalifa qism (district) of the Cairo Governorate. The district, as a whole, has an estimated population of around 108,000 in 2019; however, the district also covers other dense urban areas outside the Qarafa cemeteries.

==== Imam al-Shafi'i district ====
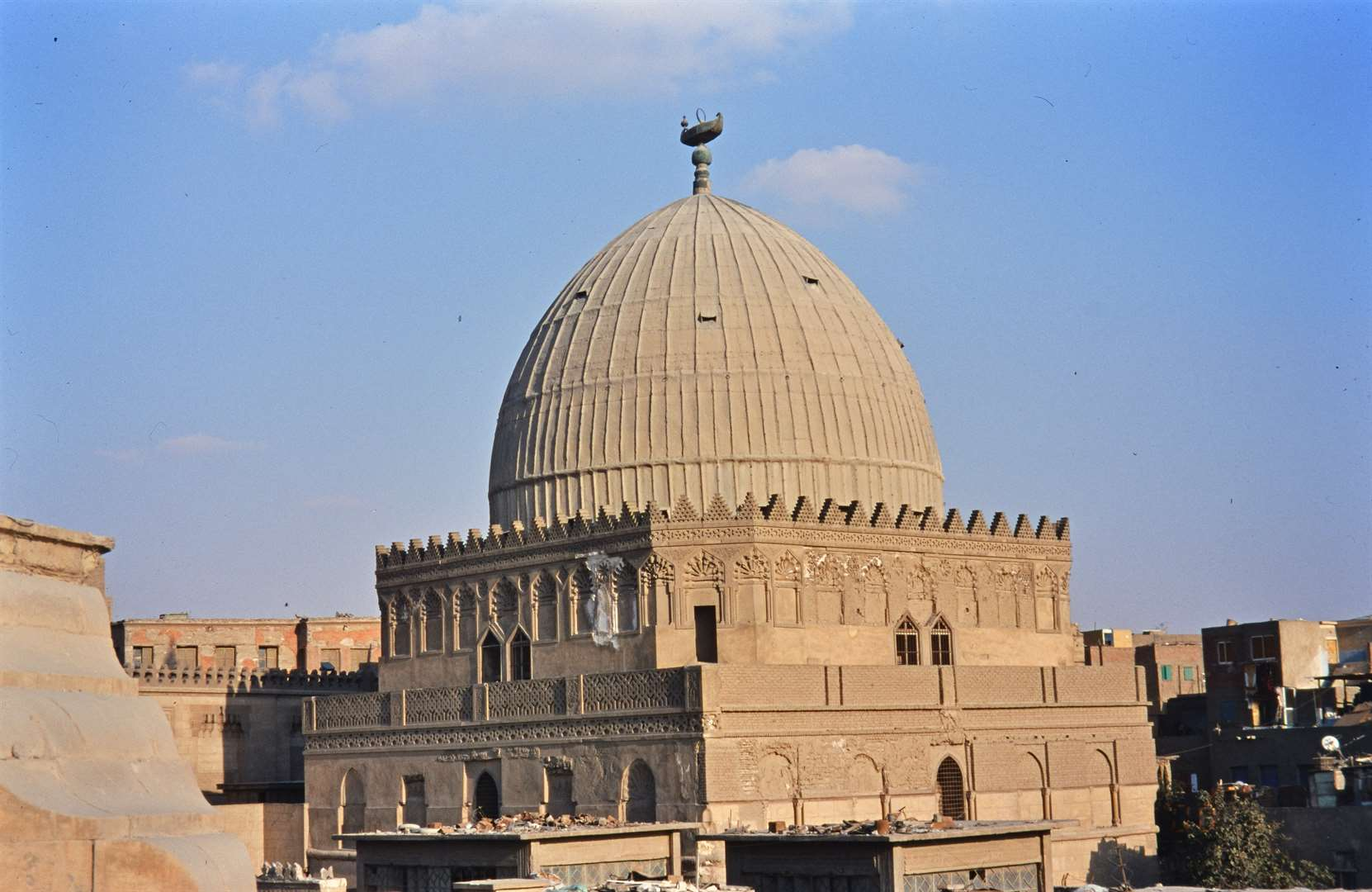
Dome of the Imam al-Shafi'i Mausoleum in the Southern Cemetery

Arguably the most important site in the Southern Cemetery is the Mausoleum of Imam al-Shafi'i and its adjoining mosque. Al-Shafi'i was an extremely important Islamic scholar who founded the Shafi'i madhhab (a school of Islamic jurisprudence) which is predominant in many parts of the Muslim world. His tomb is of major religious and spiritual importance for many, as an important site of baraka and an attraction for pilgrims from across the Muslim world. His mausoleum is also a monument of major architectural and historic importance in itself: it is the largest freestanding mausoleum in Egypt and its current structure was founded by the Ayyubid sultan al-Kamil in 1211 (with many subsequent modifications and restorations). Salah ad-Din also built the first Sunni madrasa in Egypt here, based on the Shafi'i madhhab, in order to counter the long-running missionary efforts of the Shi'a Fatimids (whom he had deposed). The site of that madrasa later became the site of the current mosque adjoining the mausoleum.

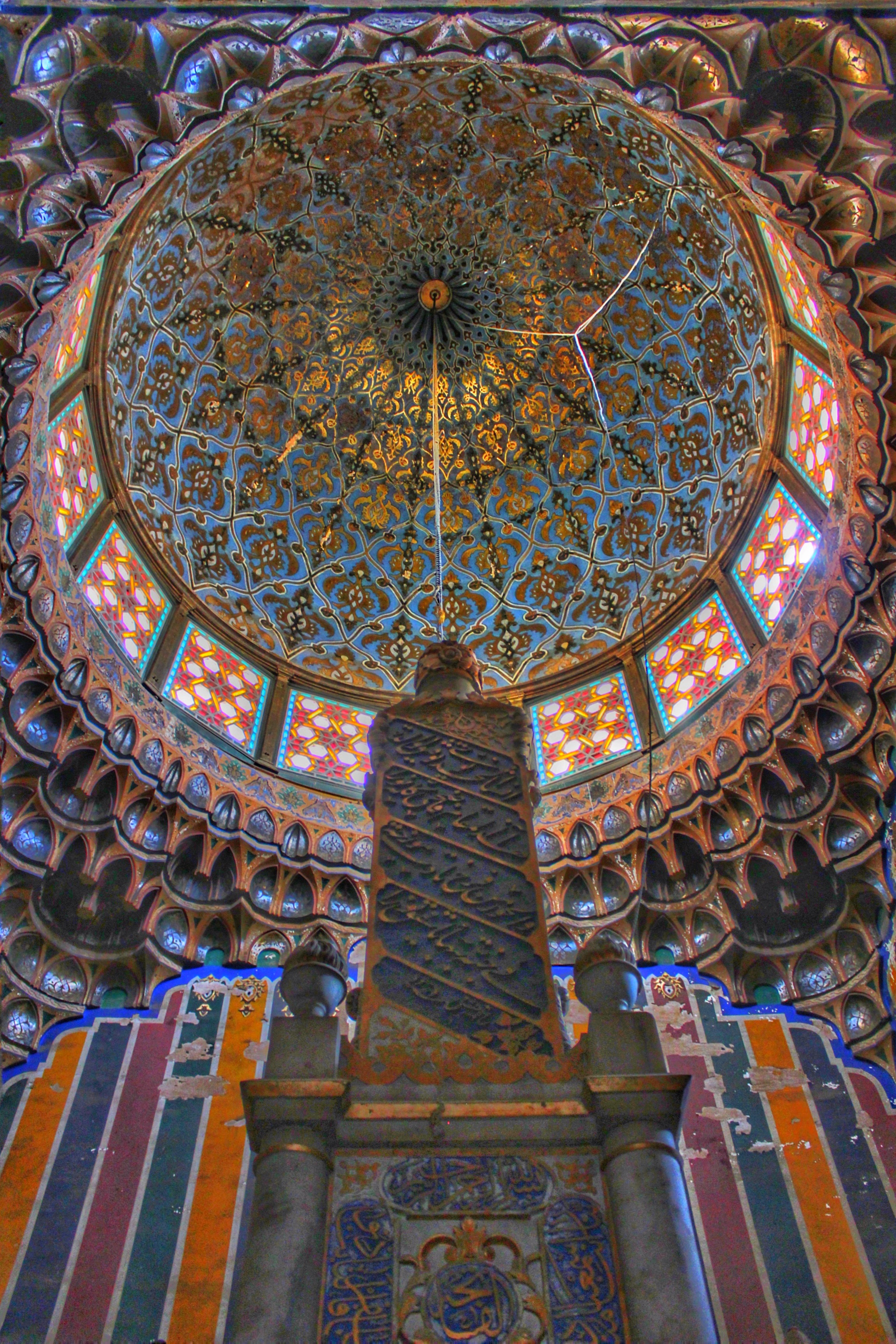
One of the domed tomb chambers in the Hosh al-Basha, the mausoleum (hawsh) of Muhammad Ali's family, 19th century

Today, the area east of Imam al-Shafi'i's mausoleum is a densely populated neighborhood named after him, the eastern part of which is also known as al-Tunsi. In 1907 it was incorporated into the city's transit network via a streetcar (no longer extant) that ran from Imami al-Shafi'i Square (in front of the mosque) to the Pyramids in the west, thus promoting its development. The area is also the site of other monuments: notably, the Hosh al-Basha, the lavish 19th-century mausoleum of Muhammad Ali's family, is just west of Imam al-Shafi'i's mausoleum. A number of lesser-known Fatimid-era funerary monuments, featuring architectural similarities with the Mashhad of Sayyida Ruqayya to the north, are also documented. The UNESCO World Heritage Site entry for Historic Cairo lists the area as the "Al-Imam ash-Shaf'i Necropolis".

==== Sayyida Nafisa Mosque and al-Khalifa neighbourhood ====
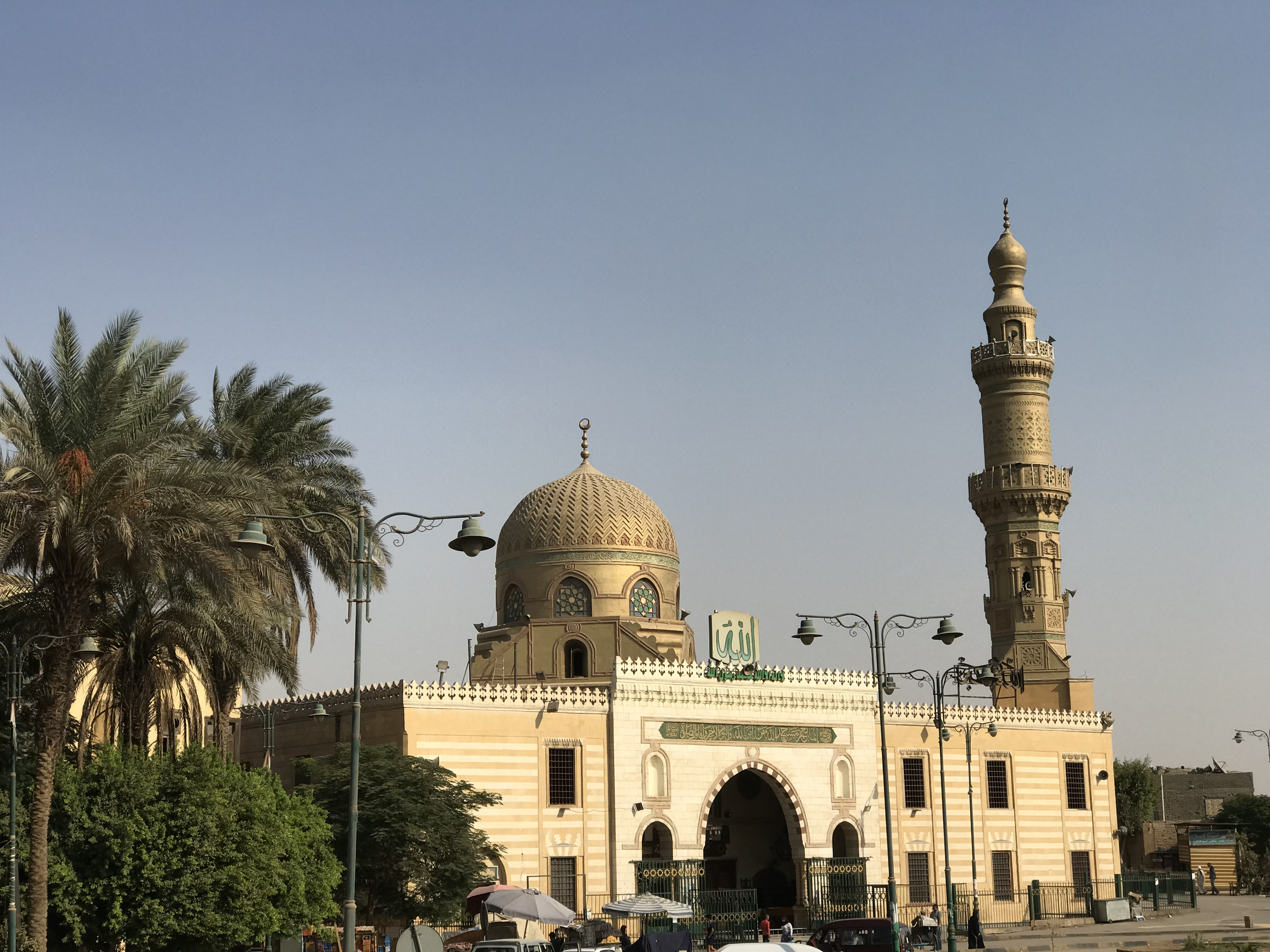
The Sayyida Nafisa Mosque

The northern part of the necropolis, north of the Salah Salem road, is known as the al-Khalifa neighbourhood. ("Al-Khalifa" is also the name of the wider administrative district or qism in the Cairo Governorate which contains the Southern Cemetery today.) It is the site of the Sayyida Nafisa Mosque and, next to it, the Tombs of the Abbasid Caliphs which probably gave the area its name. The main road leading past it, Shari'a al-Khalifa, is historically the southern continuation of the qasaba avenue (which at its northern end is known as al-Mu'izz street) and was the main north–south road of Cairo for centuries, starting at Bab al-Futuh and leading all the way into the Qarafa. The mosque contains the tomb of Sayyida Nafisa, a granddaughter of Hasan, the second Shi'i Imam and grandson of Muhammad. She was an immigrant to Fustat and acquired a strong reputation for baraka before her death in 824 CE, and her tomb is still highly important and popular today. Due to the importance the Sayyida Nafisa shrine, the area is also referred to as the "As-Sayyidah Nafisah Necropolis" (by UNESCO) or "Sayyida Nafisa Cemetery".

Behind (east of) the Sayyida Nafisa Mosque stand the Tombs of the Abbasid Caliphs, a mausoleum which holds the remains of the successors of the Abbasid Caliphs of Baghdad. The latter were re-established in Cairo in 1261 by Sultan Baybars following the Mongols' destruction of Baghdad, but they were subsequently restricted to a strictly ceremonial role within the Mamluk Sultanate.

North of the Sayyida Nafisa Mosque, the tombs and cemeteries blend into the dense urban fabric of the city. There are several historically and architecturally important tombs along Shari'a al-Khalifa here, including the Fatimid-era Mashhad of Sayyida Ruqayya (daughter of 'Ali), the Tomb of Sultan al-Ashraf Khalil (dated to 1288), and the Tomb of Shagarat al-Durr (the only female ruler of Egypt in the Islamic era, who played a crucial role during the transition from Ayyubid to Mamluk rule).

==== Sayyida Aisha Mosque and al-Qadiriya neighborhood ====
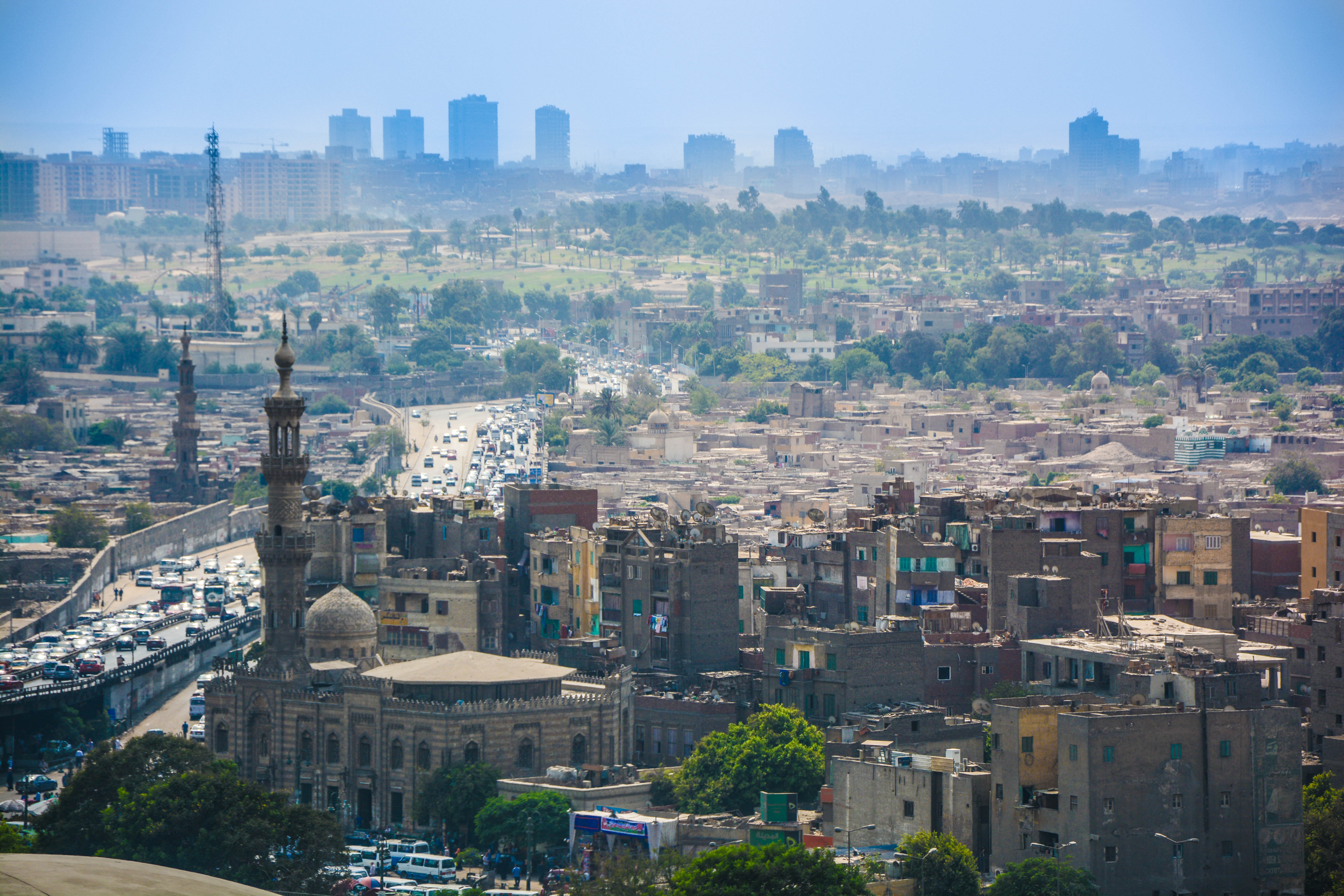
Mix of residential blocs, highways, and cemeteries near the Mosque of Sayyida Aisha (lower left)

At the northern end of the Qarafa, east of al-Khalifa and near the Citadel, is the Mosque of Sayyida Aisha. It contains the tomb of 'Aisha, the daughter of Ja'far al-Sadiq, the sixth Shi'i Imam and a descendant of Muhammad. She died in 762 CE in Egypt. The Mosque has been embellished and rebuilt by many patrons over the centuries, and is still popular today.

Directly south of the mosque, across the Salah Salem road, is the neighborhood of al-Qadiriya, centered around the street by that name. At its entrance are the remains of the Bab al-Qarafa, an old gate in the city walls giving access the Qarafa and which was rebuilt in the 15th century by Sultan Qaytbay. It is now overshadowed by the Salah Salem bypass. A number of other historical mosques and monuments are in the area, including the Mausoleum and Zawiya of Shaykh Zayn al-Din Yusuf (dating from 1298 to 1299), on al-Qadiriya street, whose presence was probably an early catalyst for settlement in that area. The cemetery on the eastern side of this neighborhood contains the remains of a cluster of monuments from the Mamluk era. They are architecturally impressive but have been partly destroyed over the years. They include the Mausoleum and Khanqah of Amir Qawsun (founded in 1335) and the so-called "Sultaniyya" Mausoleum (believed to be dedicated to Sultan Hasan's mother, in the mid-14th century).

=== Northern Cemetery ===
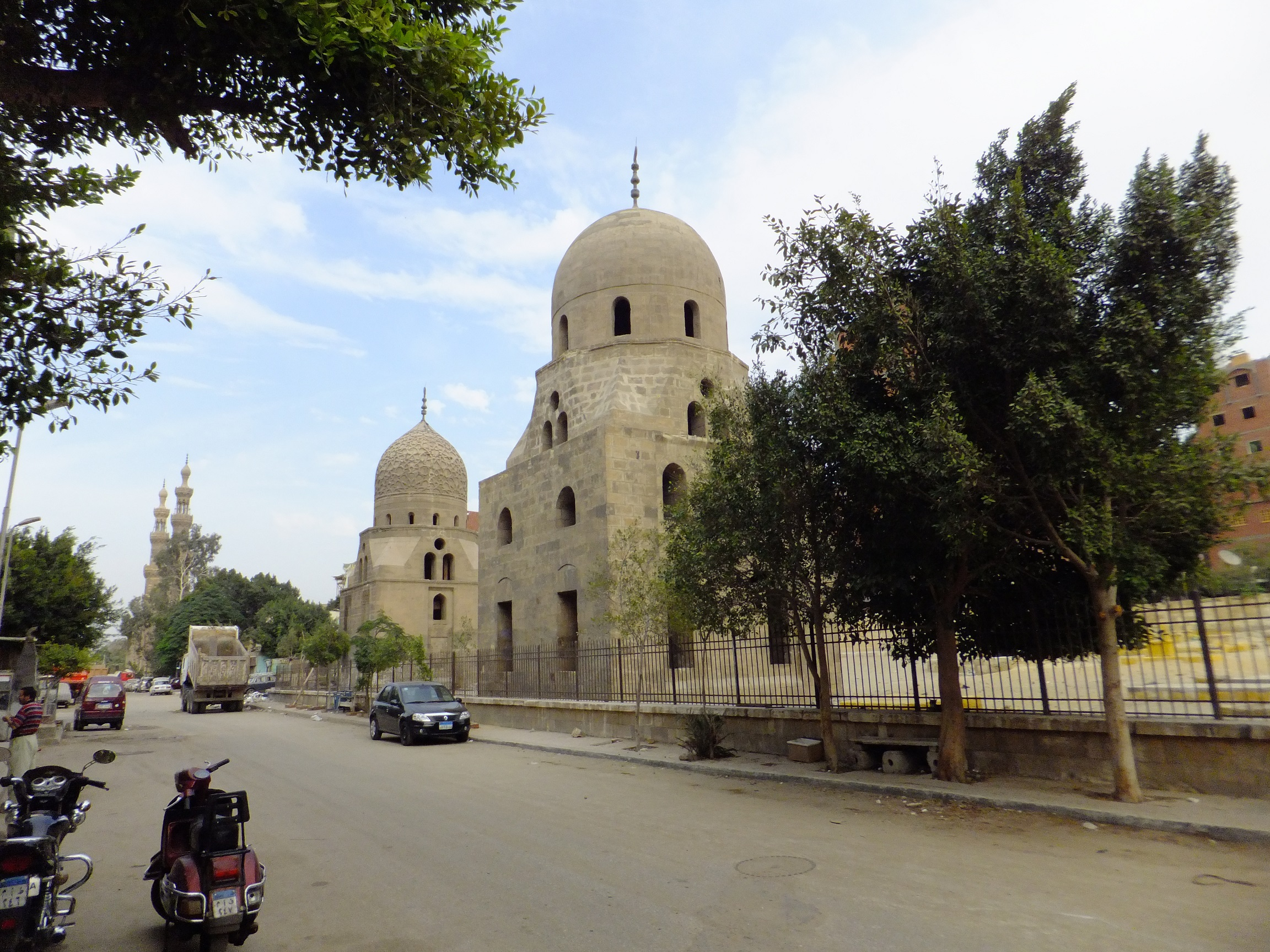
Main road in the Qaytbay district of the Northern Cemetery

The Northern Cemetery (also called the Eastern Cemetery, or Qarafat ash-sharq in Arabic, because it was east of the city walls) is relatively younger than the main Qarafa to the south and dates back to the Mamluk period. It is also known as the Mamluk Desert Cemetery (Arabic: صحراء المماليك, romanized: Saharet al-Mamalik, lit. 'Desert of the Mamluks'). Today it is sandwiched between two major roads: Shari'a Salah Salem to the west and Kobri Al Ebageah to the east. At its center, the area around the mosque of Qaytbay and north of it is an urbanized neighborhood with multistory apartment blocs. East of Kobri Al Ebageah is the slum settlement of Manshiyet Nasr rising into the Mokattam hills. West of Shari'a Salah Salem is the al-Darrasa neighborhood and Al-Azhar Park, along the edge of the old city walls.

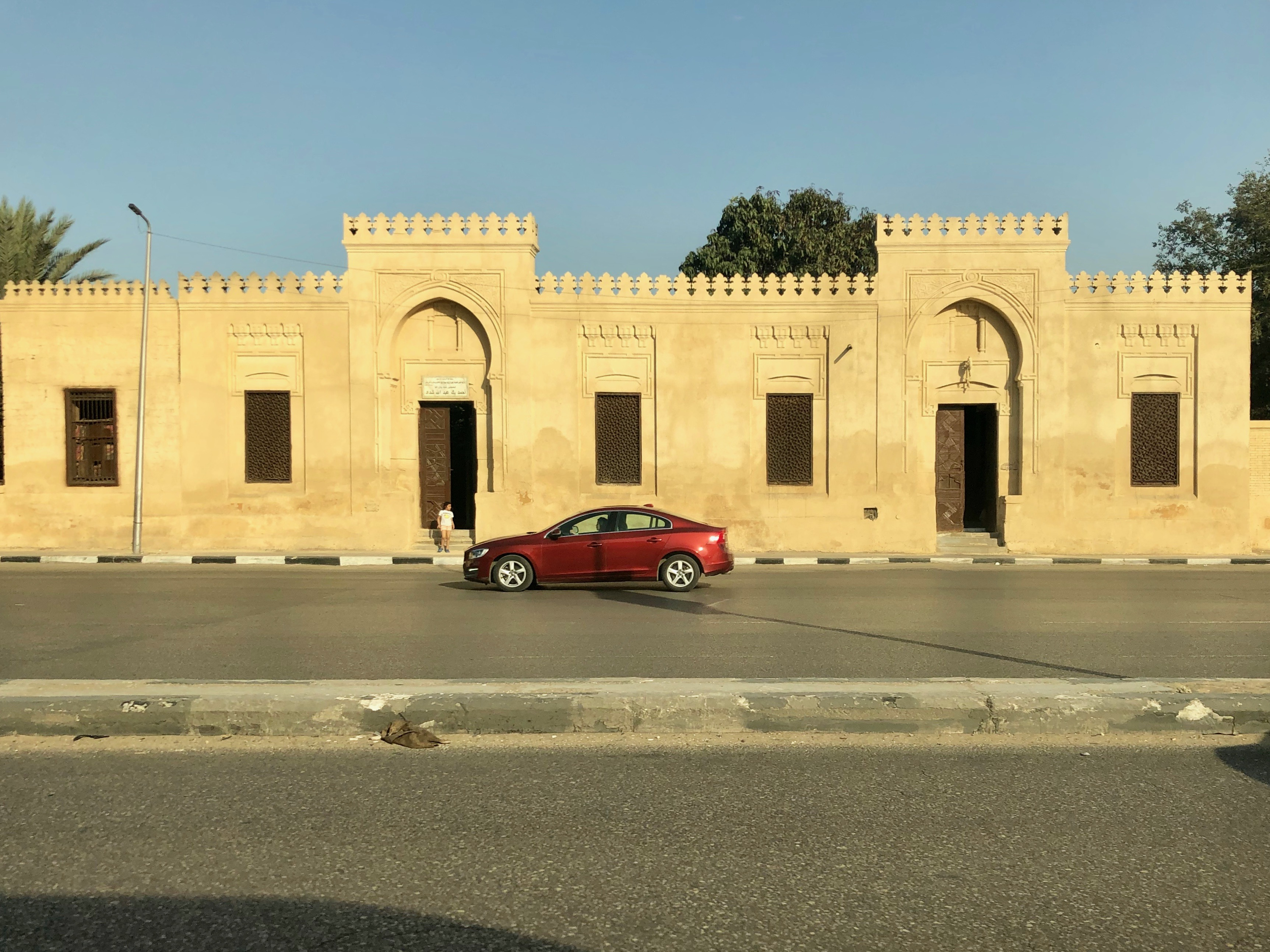
Typical cemetery enclosures in the Northern Cemetery, seen along Salah Salem highway

The site began as a sparsely occupied desert area outside Cairo's city walls through which the pilgrimage route to Mecca passed. This road grew in importance during the Mamluk period, when the Crusader threat had ended and Cairo directly controlled the Holy Cities (Mecca and Medina). The area was progressively developed by Mamluk sultans in the 14th and 15th centuries as they sought space to build their own grand funerary monuments outside the overcrowded city and the by-then saturated Qarafa south of the Citadel. Some of their projects appear to have been designed to urbanize the area, and an estimated population of 4,000 may have already lived here by the mid-15th century. Most of the region, however, turned into an extension of Cairo's necropolis, and is now densely filled with tombs.

Some of the most celebrated examples of Mamluk architecture are found in this district, particularly from the Burji period. The most famous are the Mosque and mausoleum complex of Sultan Qaytbay (featured on the Egyptian 1 Pound note), the Mausoleum complex of Sultan Barsbay, and the Khanqah-mausoleum of Sultan Farag ibn Barquq. Also notable are the large funerary complexes of Amir Qurqumas and Sultan Inal further north, along with other smaller but prominent mausoleums topped by the stone domes which became distinctive of Mamluk architecture. The UNESCO World Heritage Site entry for Historic Cairo refers to this area as the "Qaytbay Necropolis", given the fame of Qaytbay's mausoleum.

Today, most of the Northern Cemetery is located within the Manshiyat Naser qism (district) of the Cairo Governorate. The district as a whole has an estimated population of 266,000, but this covers a wide area of densely inhabited settlements and neighbourhoods outside the Northern Cemetery.

==== Bab al-Wazir Cemetery ====
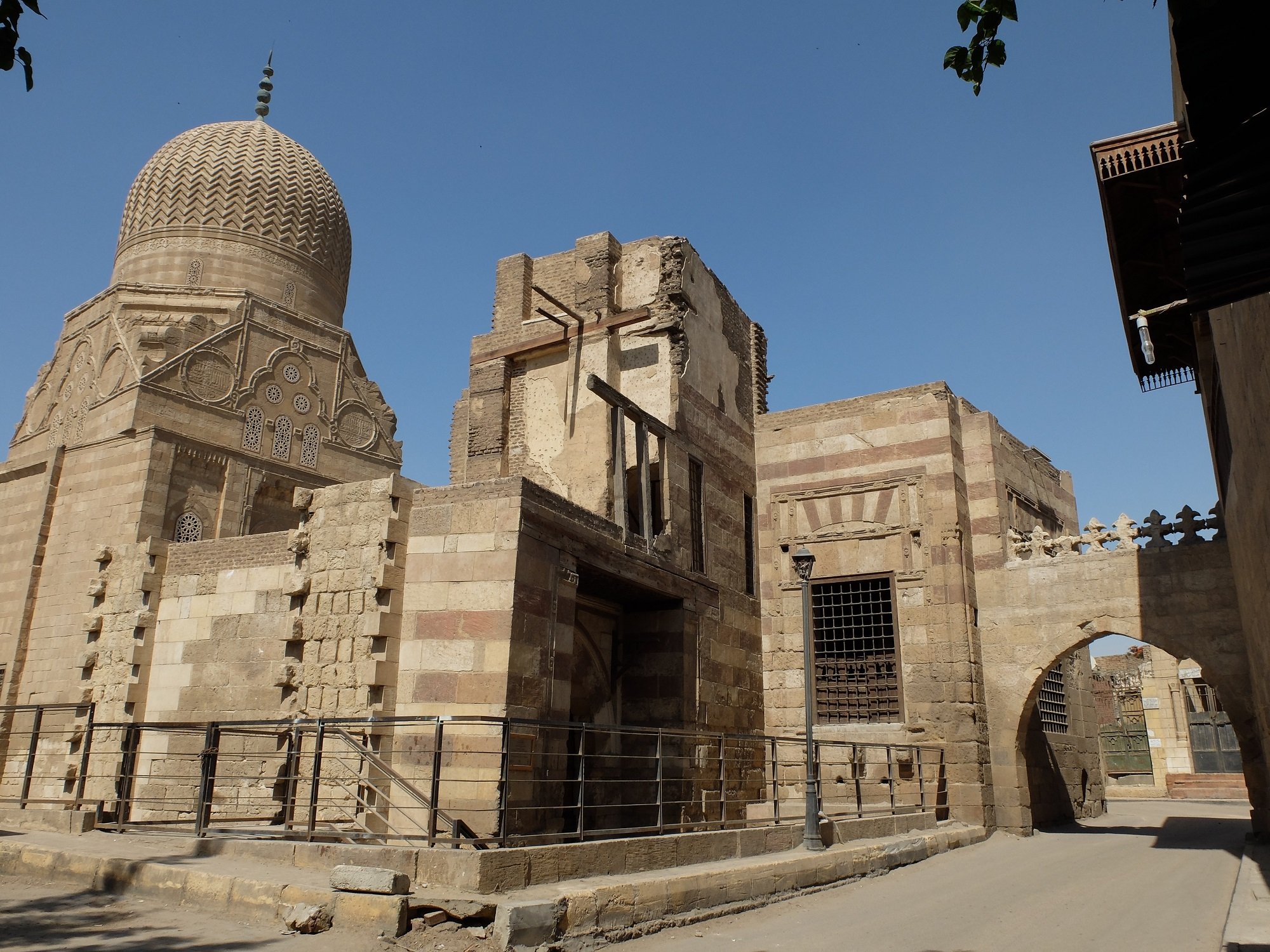
The Mausoleum of Tarabay al-Sharifi and remains of its funerary complex at Bab al-Wazir

The southern tip of the Northern Cemetery zone is also referred to as the Bab al-Wazir Cemetery, named after the former Bab al-Wazir city gate nearby. It lies close to the Citadel walls, adjoining the district of al-Darb al-Ahmar, and is cut off from the rest of the cemeteries by the modern Salah Salem road. It originally developed separately from the rest of the Northern Cemetery but it too dates back to the Mamluk period. It contains another cluster of monuments in various states of preservation, such as the restored Mausoleum of Tarabay al-Sharifi and the distinctive tall narrow dome of the Mausoleum of Yunus al-Dawadar. Unlike the rest of the Northern Cemetery further north, the Bab al-Wazir Cemetery is part of the Al-Darb al-Ahmar qism (district) of the Cairo Governorate.

=== Bab-al Nasr Cemetery ===
The Bab-al Nasr cemetery is much smaller in size than the other necropolises and lies directly north of the historic city walls, sandwiched between the al-Husayniya neighborhood (historically a northern suburb of Cairo) and what is now the northern part of the al-Darrasa neighborhood (which separates it from the Northern Cemetery). It is located within the Al-Gamaliyya qism (district) of the Cairo Governorate.

The cemetery is distinguished from the other two necropolises by its lack of monumental funerary structures, but also by the distinctive wooden enclosures that shelter the hawsh units here. Nonetheless, a number of famous historical figures are believed to be buried here, including the Fatimid vizier Badr al-Gamali, the scholar and traveler Ibn Khaldun, and probably the historian al-Maqrizi; though unfortunately the locations of their tombs are now unknown. Badr al-Gamali is responsible for the construction of the nearby city walls (including the gate of Bab al-Nasr), and his decision to be interred here may have marked the beginning of the cemetery, whose fortunes subsequently rose and fell along with those of the surrounding neighborhoods.

== Population and socioeconomic status ==
=== Population estimates ===
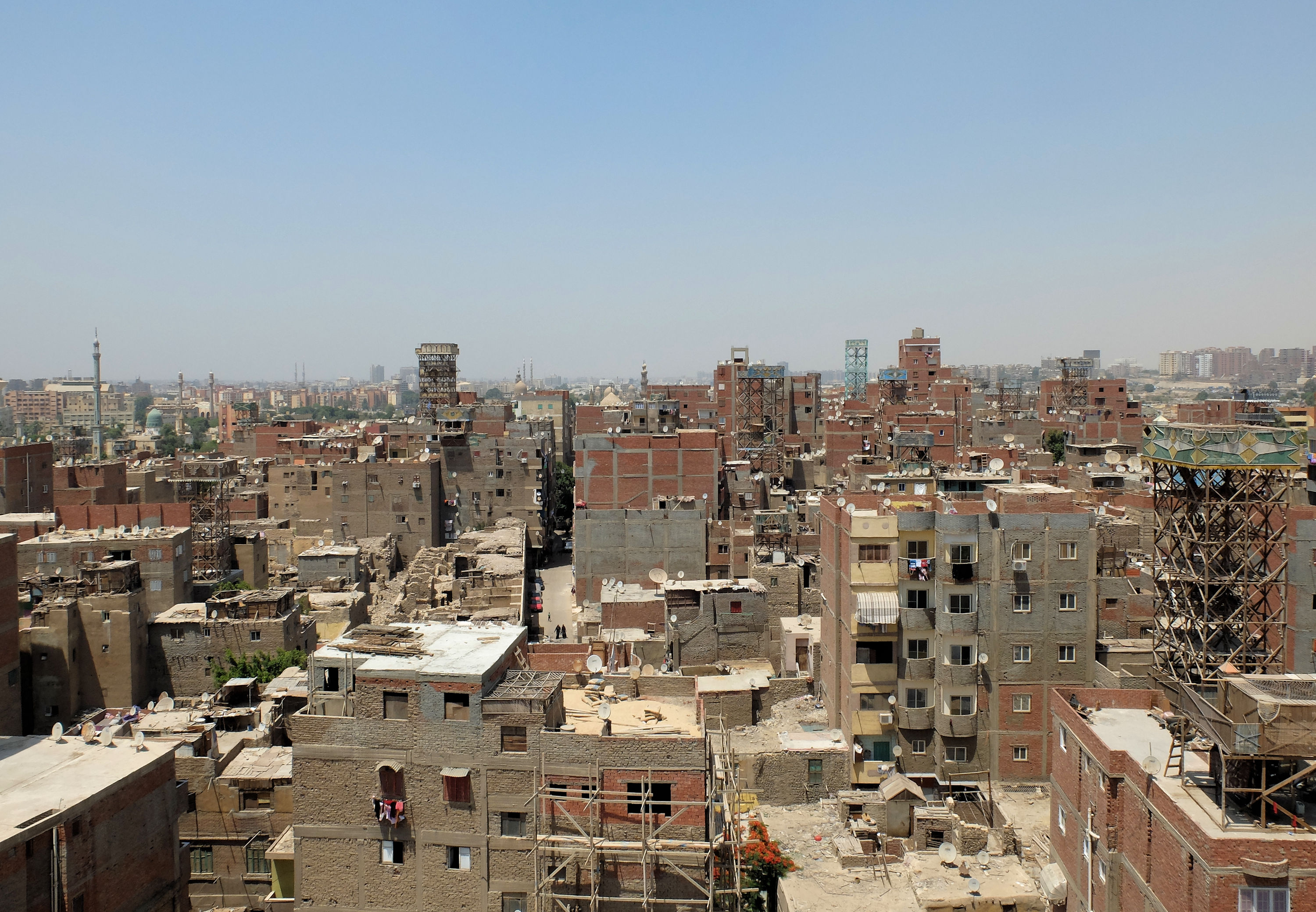
Residential blocs in the Qaytbay neighbourhood of the Northern Cemetery

Estimating the population of the "City of the Dead" is problematic due to difficulties in defining it precisely. It does not correspond to one administrative district (qism) in the Egyptian census but stretches across several, with some cemeteries blending into the main urban fabric of Cairo without presenting a clear border between city and necropolis. The Southern Cemetery is located within the al-Khalifa district and most of the Northern Cemetery (except the Bab al-Wazir Cemetery) is in the Manshiyat Naser district, but both of those administrative districts cover denser urban areas outside the necropolis zone.

Estimates based on scholarly studies and the 1986 census put the population of all the cemetery zones at nearly 180,000 during that time. A commonly cited estimate puts the current population at half a million or more people, and some put it even as high as two million. However, these estimates are argued to be unreliable as they do not match the current population trends in Cairo and they may be based on previous exaggerations of the cemetery population. The combined population of the al-Khalifa and Manshiyet Nasr administrative districts, based on previous census data, is estimated at 375,000 in 2019. Nonetheless, as mentioned above these districts also cover dense urban areas outside the necropolis, meaning that the number of people living inside the cemeteries themselves is likely much lower.

=== Living conditions ===
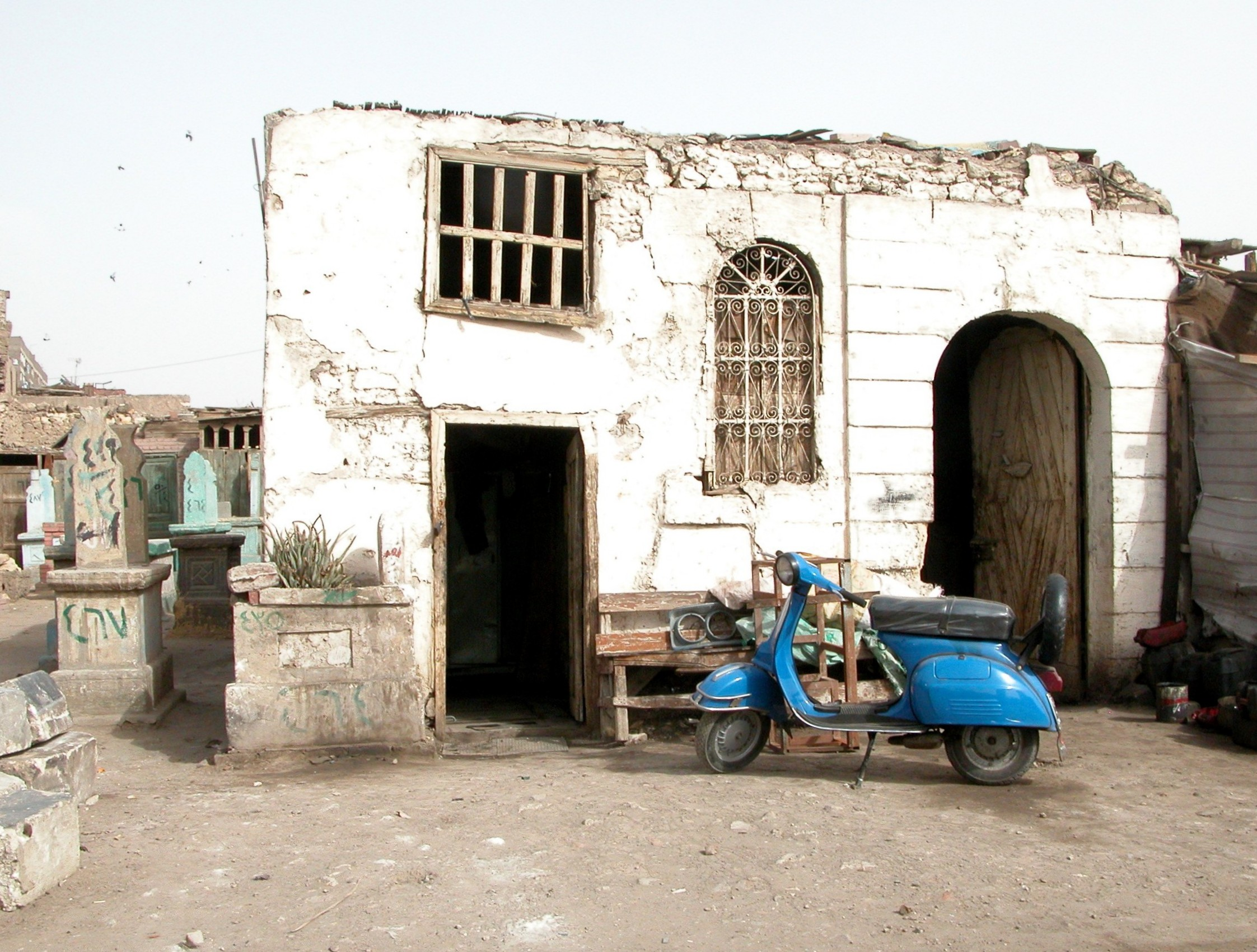
A tomb structure in the City of the Dead, adapted as a residence

The City of the Dead has been characterized as a slum. Popular representations have been criticized by some scholars for relying too heavily on the story of the "tomb-dwellers" (people squatting in the tomb structures), whose existence has been sensationalized in the media and whose numbers are almost certainly greatly exaggerated or misconstrued. In fact, the majority of the residents live in regular urban housing and neighborhoods which, through various historical circumstances, developed inside the cemetery zones. Like many parts of modern Cairo, the neighborhoods here developed in part through the construction of unregulated "informal" housing; which is to say low-cost constructions, often apartment blocs, built privately without the official approval of authorities.

Towards the end of the twentieth century, a large proportion of residents were making their livelihoods in transformation (or material processing) industries, manufacturing, and construction. Even of those living among the actual tombs, at least half of them in the 1980s (when the tomb-dwelling population appears to have peaked) were workers, along with their families, whose livelihoods were directly linked to the tombs themselves, such as morticians, gravediggers, masons, and private tomb guardians.

Today, the neighborhoods are similar in quality to other working-class Cairo neighborhoods and have limited but relatively decent infrastructure, including water, electricity, schools, a post office, and other facilities. That being said, for those living in "unofficial" or improvised housing in the tombs the situation is generally worse. Shantytowns are mostly gone, but only a portion of tomb residents have good access to regular amenities. The tomb enclosures, typically walled structures built to house the tombs of one extended family (also known as a hawsh), are nonetheless considered better, in some respects, than poor-quality housing elsewhere in the city.

=== Social stigma and challenges ===
Regardless of their actual living conditions in the cemetery zones, the residents do live in a socially and politically precarious position. Although the tradition of visiting and spending time with the graves of relatives (even staying overnight at the tombs) dates back to Ancient Egypt and is still practiced to some extent today, the idea of living permanently among tombs has arguably lost its cultural legitimacy in modern times due to more restrictive attitudes about the function of cemeteries. Today, many Egyptians avoid the area at night and believe that the cemeteries are predominantly inhabited by social outcasts and are places of greater criminal activity. This may be exaggerated to some extent, as there is no clear evidence that poverty or crime are greater problems overall here than in other working-class districts of Cairo – although drug-trafficking was indeed documented at one point.

The authorities have been historically ambivalent as to how to deal with the growing population in the cemeteries. The issue is a concern for the conservation of historical monuments and it has often been cited by critics of the government as evidence of its inadequate housing and planning policies. Official attitudes have varied from modest measures to improve living conditions to bold proposals to forcibly move the inhabitants, but no overarching plan has been put into effect so far. The inhabitants of the cemeteries are socially heterogeneous and live in different communities across the area, which has probably inhibited them from forming a united front in dealing with the authorities.

== Conservation ==
=== Conservation efforts ===
In the 21st century, new organizations have led efforts to restore historic monuments in the cemeteries and raise awareness about their importance. In the Northern Cemetery, the funerary complex of Sultan Qaytbay has been undergoing a long-term restoration project carried out by an organization named ARCHiNOS with the help of European Union funding. Since 2016, the project has converted the nearby ma'qad (reception hall) of the complex into a cultural center for the community. As of 2023, its latest work included restoring the dome of Qaytbay's mausoleum.

In the al-Khalifa neighbourhood in the Southern Cemetery, some conservation efforts have been led by a local organisation called Athar Lina ("The Monument Is Ours" in Arabic), established in 2012. The organisation has since restored the Mausoleum of Shajar ad-Durr, performed repairs at the Mashhad of Sayyida Ruqayya and nearby tombs, and carried out archeological work at the mausoleum complex of Imam Shafi'i.

=== Demolition concerns ===
In 2020, concerns were raised about the government's plan to build an overpass bridge through a part of the cemeteries, which has resulted in some early 20th-century mausoleums being demolished, with little consultation from locals. The overpass was built across the Southern Cemetery, near the Imam al-Shafi'i neighbourhood. Since then, ongoing demolition and construction plans have continued to elicit controversy and objections from locals, conservationists, and scholars. In 2022, the government ordered the demolition of the tomb of Egyptian writer Taha Hussein (d. 1973), before stepping back its plans due to public backlash. As of 2023, the major demolitions that have taken place have mainly affected tombs of notable families from the late 19th century and early 20th century.

The government has claimed that no historic monuments would be damaged during construction and has argued that the projects are important infrastructure upgrades. Conservationists have responded with concern that many historic structures in the cemetery are not officially registered as "antiquities" under Egyptian law (Note: Under Egyptian law, monuments must be at least 100 years old before being eligible for official heritage status.) and are therefore vulnerable to further demolitions. Only 102 of the 2.5 million tombs in the cemeteries are officially designated as "historic". Many families have been ordered to move the remains of their relatives to a new cemetery in 10th of Ramadan, a satellite city on the outskirts of Cairo.

As of September 2023, it was reported that around two thousand tombs were earmarked for demolition and that government plans in the area included the construction of "two new highways, two large roundabouts, a giant cloverleaf and the widening of other roads." In the same month, the government temporarily paused demolitions in the Imam al-Shafi'i neighborhood. UNESCO has expressed concern over the demolitions and has requested further information from the government.

Since 2024, significant demolitions have also been carried out in the Bab al-Nasr Cemetery (north of the Fatimid walls). According to a report by Mada Masr, around 13,000 square metres (140,000 sq ft) of the cemetery was razed in 2024 and another campaign of demolitions began in April 2025, to make way for a parking garage and shopping center.

== List of notable monuments ==
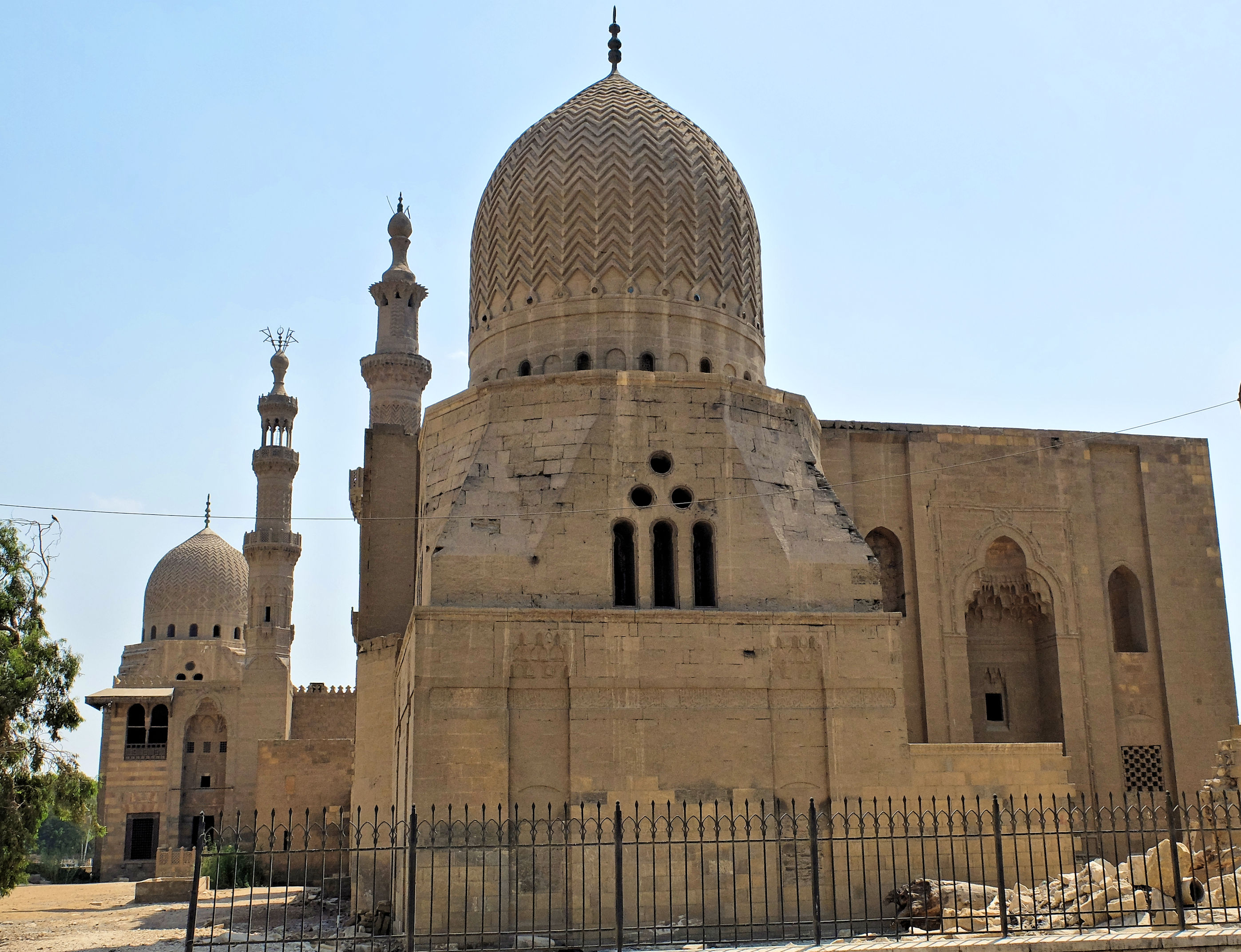
The funerary complexes of Sultan Inal (foreground) and Amir Qurqumas (left), two examples of Mamluk architecture in the City of the Dead

The cemeteries are registered as part of the UNESCO World Heritage Site of Historic Cairo and contain numerous historic mausoleums and religious sites from a wide range of periods. The following is a list of notable historic monuments and religious sites in the cemeteries.

=== Monuments in the Southern Cemetery ===
- Mausoleum of Imam al-Shafi'i
- Sayyida Nafisa Mosque
- Sayyida Aisha Mosque
- Hosh al-Basha
- Mausoleum of Shajar al-Durr
- Mashhad of Sayyida Ruqayya
- Mausoleum of Sultan al-Ashraf Khalil
- Mosque of Sayyida Sukayna
- Sultaniyya Mausoleum
- Mausoleum of Amir Qawsun
- Zawiya of Shaykh Zayn al-Din Yusuf

=== Monuments in the Northern Cemetery ===
- Funerary complex of Sultan Qaytbay
- Khanqah of Faraj ibn Barquq
- Khanqah-Mausoleum of Sultan Barsbay
- Funerary complex of Emir Qurqumas
- Funerary complex of Sultan Inal
- Mausoleum of Qansuh Abu Sa'id
- Tomb and Khanqah of Khawand Tughay (or of Umm Anuk)
- Qubbat Afandina
- Mausoleum of Tarabay al-Sharifi (in the Bab al-Wazir Cemetery)
