= Emir Qurqumas Complex =

Coordinates: 30.051841°N 31.278823°E

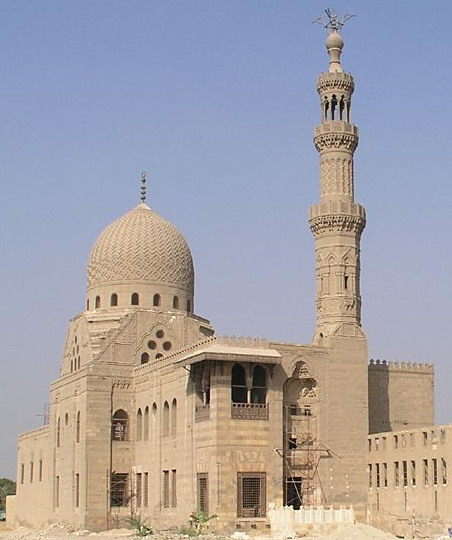
- The funeral complex of Qurqumas

Religion
- Affiliation: Islam

Location
- Location: Cairo, Egypt
- Interactive map of Emir Qurqumas Complex

Architecture
- Style: Mamluk architecture
- Completed: 1507
- Minaret: 1

The Emir Qurqumas Complex is located in Medieval Cairo, Egypt, in the City of the dead.

== Overview ==
About 200 meters south of Qansuh's tomb stands a complex which is two mausoleums joined together. That on the north is sultan Inal's. Built in 1450–1456, it is in a ruinous state but is an example of a Mamluk mausoleum, with a domed funeral chamber, a Madrasa, a Sabil, a monumental door, and a minaret. The complex also includes a Khanqah, or monastery for the Sufi Darvishes. Inal had been a slave of Sultan Barquq and could neither read nor write. He ruled from 1453 to 1460 and does not appear to have any distinction other than his lack of education. Adjoining Inal's Mausoleum is that of Qurqumas, built in 1507. It is in better condition and more elegant than Inal's, which is heavier in style.

== Polish-Egyptian Restoration Works ==
In 1972, the Polish-Egyptian Group for the Restoration of Islamic Monuments was created. It was composed of specialists from several institutions, including the Polish Centre of Mediterranean Archaeology University of Warsaw and the Institute of Mediterranean and Oriental Cultures, Polish Academy of Sciences. "The work on the site included archaeological excavations of grave chambers and foundations, anthropological research, architectural and conservation works, as well as historical studies, for example of the 16th-century donation deed of emir Qurqumas (hogga)". As a result of these works, which lasted until 2000, a protected antiquities zone was established around the complex which also includes the funerary complex of the sultan Inal.

== Qurqumas ==
Qurqumas was the commander-in-chief of the armies, also called Grand Amir, at the time of his death in 1510; the following is Ibn Iyas describing his funeral, where the four qadis (judges) attended. A former Mameluk of Ashraf Qaitbay, he was manumitted by that monarch and subsequently progressed through promotions, beginning with the job of second equerry. He had been a commander of a thousand, commander of the guard, and appointed governor of the province of Aleppo, under the reign of Amir Tumanbay, when the latter was proclaimed Sultan of Syria.

== See also ==
- Late medieval domes
