= Sayeda Aisha Mosque =

Mosque in Cairo, Egypt

Sayyida Aisha Mosque
- مسجد السيدة عائشة
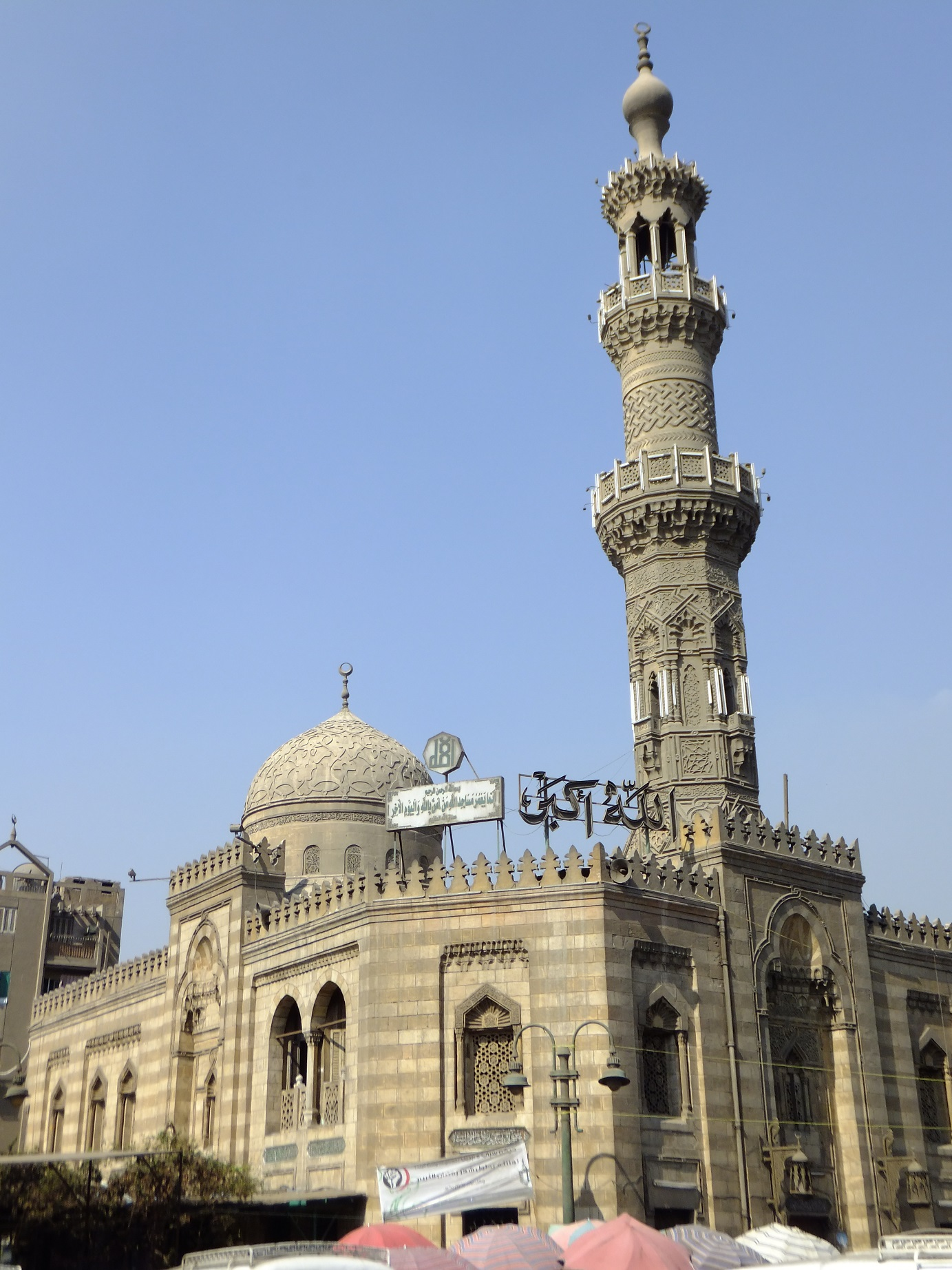

Religion
- Affiliation: Islam
- Ecclesiastical or organisational status: Mosque; Mausoleum
- Status: Active

Location
- Location: Salah ad-din Square, Islamic Cairo
- Country: Egypt
- Interactive map of Sayyida Aisha Mosque
- Coordinates: 30°01′29″N 31°15′24″E

Architecture
- Type: Mosque
- Style: Islamic
- Completed: 14th-century (foundation); 1762 (renovation); 1971 (current)

Specifications
- Dome: 1
- Minaret: 1

The Sayyida Aisha Mosque (Arabic: مسجد السيدة عائشة) is a mosque and mausoleum, located near Salah ad-din Square on a similarly named street in Islamic Cairo, Egypt. The mosque contains the tomb of Aisha bint Ja'far al-Sadiq, a female scholar who was one of the daughters of Ja'far al-Sadiq, and the mosque was named in her honour.

== History ==
The mosque is named after Aisha, daughter of Jaafar al-Sadiq, son of Muhammad al-Baqir, son of Ali Zain al-Abidin, son of Hussein, son of Ali ibn Abi Talib. She was the sister of Musa al-Kazim. She died in 145 AH (762/763 CE). Her tombstone reads: "This is the tomb of the honorable Lady Aisha, one of the children of Jaafar al-Sadiq, son of Imam Muhammad al-Baqir, son of Ali ibn Abi Talib."

The original structure was a small shrine over the grave of Sayyidah Aisha, topped by a dome. When Saladin ruled Egypt, he ordered the construction of a madrasa next to the shrine. When the new city walls of Cairo were built in the same era, the madrasa was separated from the tomb and a new gate was opened in the wall, called Bab Sayeda Aisha or Bab al-Qarafa.

In 1762, a new mosque was attached to the shrine and madrasa by Abd al-Rahman Katkhuda, a Mamluk emir during the time of Ali Bey al-Kabir.

In 1971, the old mosque, madrasa and shrine were demolished. A new mosque was erected in its place, which still stands today. When the Sayeda Aisha Bridge was built, the Qarafa Gate was demolished and Fayda Kamel renovated the Sayeda Aisha Mosque to its current state.

== Architecture ==
The original building before the Ayyubid period had roughly square plan and had a dome resting on two layers of muqarnas.

The 1971 restoration expanded the mosque into its present form. It has two doors; one for men, which leads to the prayer hall, and another side door for women, which leads directly to the tomb chamber. The mosque has a large dome, which is supported by eight concrete pillars in a circular formation. On the dome is in inscription which reads: "Aisha has a bright light and joy, and her dome in which supplications are answered." The mosque has one minaret.

== See also ==
- Islam in Egypt
- List of mausoleums in Cairo
- List of mosques in Cairo
