= Late medieval domes =

Domes in religious architecture in the Late Middle Ages

The domes of the Late Middle Ages (c. 1300-1500) built by Arab Muslim and Western European Christian states included star vaults, crossed-arch domes, and extraordinarily intricate examples of stucco muqarnas domes. In 14th century Egypt, the Mamluks began building domes in stone for the tombs of sultans and emirs and would construct hundreds of them over the next two and a half centuries. Externally, their supporting structures are distinguished by chamfered or stepped angles and round windows in a triangular arrangement. A variety of shapes for the domes themselves were used, such as bulbous, ogee, and keel-shaped, and they included carved patterns in spirals, zigzags, and floral designs.

Gothic domes were unusual but some examples were made with a "double-chevet" technique. Efforts in Tuscany to build domes with exposed external profiles culminated in the octagonal pointed-profile dome of Florence Cathedral, the largest masonry dome ever built. Florence developed domes in a Renaissance style after a period of innovation in the 15th century. The first dome known to have been built within the city of Rome since the 5th century was begun in 1453. Venetian Renaissance architecture in the late 15th century included low domes on pendentives in the Byzantine style. Bulbous minarets from Egypt spread to Syria in the 15th century and would influence the use of bulbous domes in the architecture of the Low Countries of northwest Europe, having become associated with the Holy Land by pilgrims.

== Rasulid dynasty ==
The domes of Zabid were periodically whitewashed with stucco and date to the 13th and 14th centuries. Not all mosques have domes but those that do typically have one to three domes over the prayer hall. An additional hall across the courtyard from the prayer hall may also be domed. The domes appear to be smaller and simplified versions of those found in Taiz, without painted and carved decorations or hanging squinches.

The three surviving royal buildings in Taiz are the Mudhaffar Mosque and madrasa-mosque of Ashrafiya, both with a large central dome over the prayer hall and adjacent smaller domes, and al-Mu'tabiyah madrasah, which has six domes of equal size over its prayer hall. The Mu'tabiyya Madrasa (1392) also includes domes over some teaching rooms connected to its southern courtyard. The Ashrafiya Mosque and madrasa has a prayer hall roofed by a large dome with pairs of smaller domes on the sides. It also includes a domed khanaqah. The gadrooned domes may have been based on domes in the Jazira and southeast Anatolia.

In Sa'da, domed tombs of Zaydi imams can be found in the mosque of Hadi. Domed open kiosks, mostly from the 15th century, mark the burials of the imams' families. Gadrooned domes were sometimes used at Sa'da, but domes at Zafar, Dhibin, and elsewhere were usually hemispherical and simple.

== Kingdom of England ==
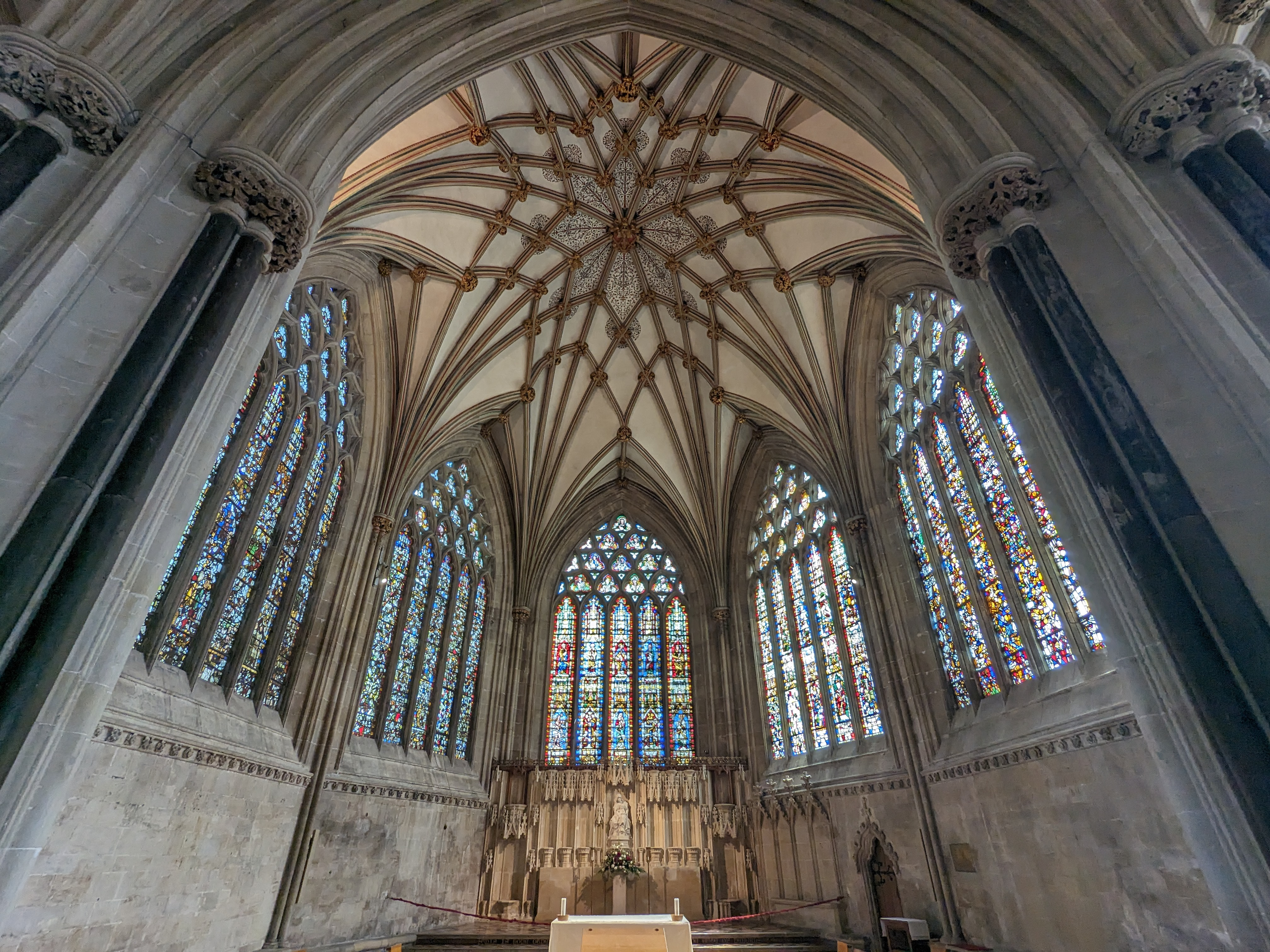
Wells Cathedral's Lady Chapel

Timber star vaults such as those over York Minster's octagonal Chapter house (ca. 1286–1296) and the elongated octagon plan of Wells Cathedral's Lady Chapel (ca. 1320–1340) imitated much heavier stone vaulting. The lack of a central column differentiated the York Minster Chapter House vault from those of previous chapter houses in England and made the vaulting over the 59 foot (18 meter) span "a virtual Gothic dome." The Lady Chapel is unique in that it is an irregular octagon with windows in five of the eight sides and a "ribbed vault with characteristics of a dome". The domed vault with a net-like pattern of ribs was built by Thomas of Witney by 1326.

The wooden vaulting over the crossing of Ely Cathedral was built after the original crossing tower collapsed in 1322. It was conceived by Alan of Walsingham and designed by master carpenter William Hurley. Eight hammer vaults extend from eight piers over the 22 meter wide octagonal crossing and meet at the base of a large octagonal lantern, which is covered by a star vault. The Gothic dome of Ely Cathedral's Octagon is unique.

A dome with a pyramidal roof and lantern at the Abbot's kitchen of Glastonbury Abbey dates to the early 14th century.

Similar vaulting was built over the kitchen of Newenham Abbey by 1338.

The kitchen of Durham Cathedral features a crossed-arch dome built from 1366-1374. Built by John Lewyn, the vaults might have been inspired by those of the Mosque–Cathedral of Córdoba if Lewyn traveled to Spain as part of the assistance given by Edward III of England to Peter of Castile.

== Mamluk Sultanate ==
=== Bahri dynasty ===
The two domes of the Tomb of Salar and Sangar al-Gawli (1303-1304) were built by Sanjar al-Jawli to house the burials of himself and his respected companion Sayf al-Din Salar. The larger and more decorated dome was made for Salar.

Mosques built in the Syrian region after a revival in the late 11th century usually followed the Umayyad model, especially that of the Mosque of Damascus. Domed examples include the mosque at Sarmin (1305–6) and the mosque at al-Bab (1305). The typical Damascus dome is smooth and supported by a double zone of squinches: four squinches create an eight sided transition that includes eight more squinches, and these create a sixteen-sided drum with windows in alternate sides.

The Khanqah of Baybars II (1307-1310) has muqarnas in four layers of corner and wall multi-foil arches that form a 28-sided polygon base for the dome. The Egyptian stone dome of Qubbat al-Muẓaffar ʿAlam al-Dīn Sanjar (1322) has muqarnas in its transitional zone similar to those of the entrance semi-dome of Khanqah of Baybars II, but also similar to earlier examples in Syria, such as the 1235 stone dome of Al-Firdaws Madrasa in Aleppo and the late 13th century the east chamber of Mashhad Ḥusayn in Aleppo, suggesting that the Syrian stone muqarnas technique was introduced to Cairo in the early 14th century. Brick transitional domes continued to be used in small domes from the 1320s through the 1360s.

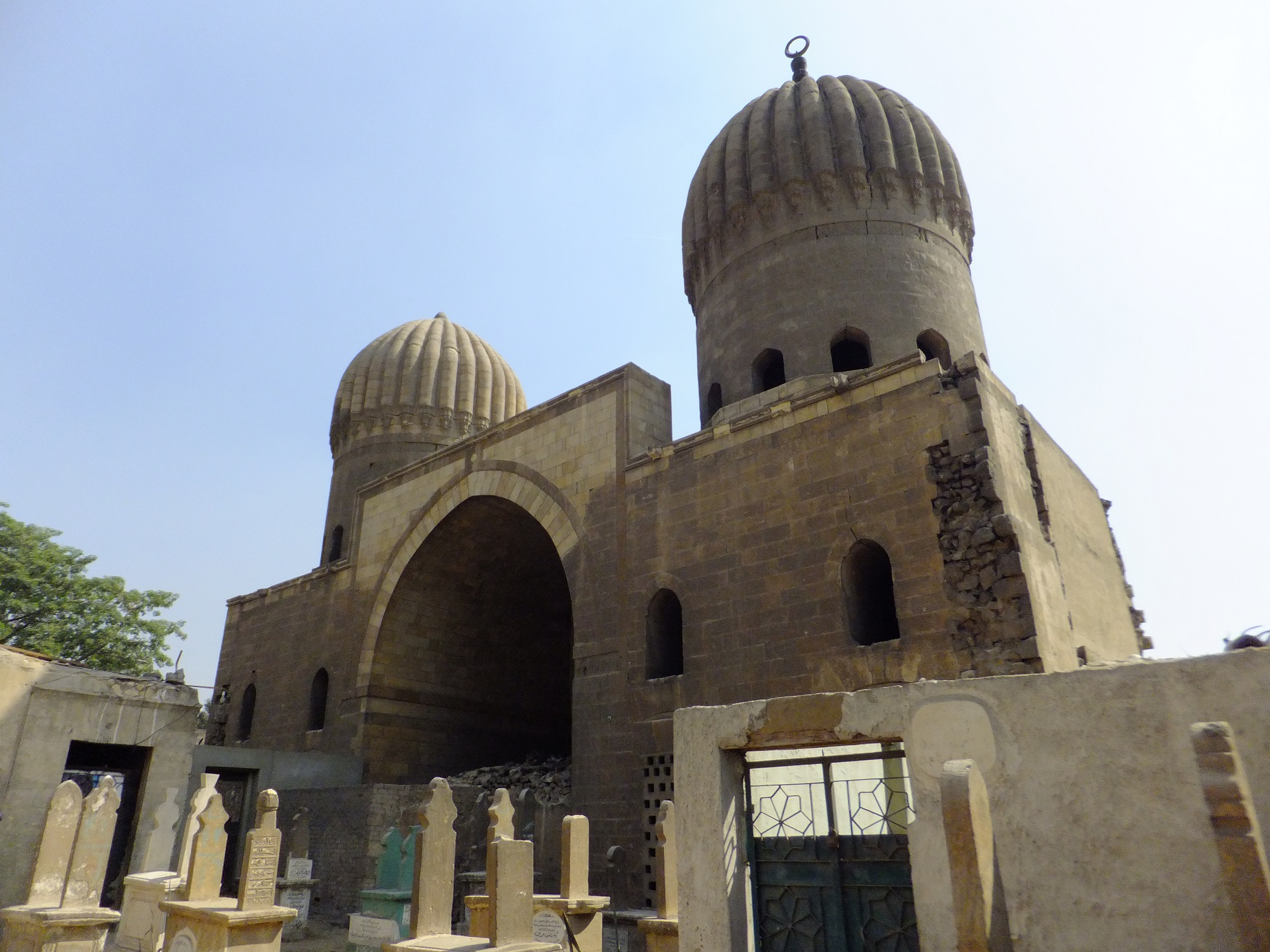
The Sultaniyya Mausoleum

Several Mamluk buildings have two domes flanking a entrance or iwan, such as the mausoleum of al-Tawashi Mukhtar (after 1316) in Damascus, al-Turba al-Kawka-ba'iyya mausoleum (1330) in Damascus, al-Turba al-Kilaniyya (1352) in Jerusalem, the mausoleum of Khawand Tughay Umm Anuk (between 1339 and 1349), the Sultaniyya Mausoleum (1350s-1360s), and the Rashidiyya Mausoleum (1366-1367). The non-funerary dome in Syrian funerary complexes was most often a small mosque with informal teaching functions. The identical domes over the funerary and philanthropic portions of the buildings "may originally have been prompted by the benefactor's desire to demonstrate that he was as keen on perpetuating his charity, be it as modest and basic as a musalla or maktab aytam, as he was on perpetuating his name."

Egypt's Turbat al-Sitt (1324) has a brick dome with an unusual transitional zone made of four layers of brick muqarnas and stucco over a wooden framework. The muqarnas combine Syrian elements along with local Egyptian elements in the upper layers. The brick pseudo-pendentives fill structural squinches.

The Mamluks continued the smooth domes of the Ayyubid style, with no apparent exterior drums, until the mid 14th century. The last example of a smooth hemispherical dome from this period was that of the Mausoleum of Ulmas al-Hajib (1329–1330). Most of the smooth domes are brick, but a stone example is in the narthex of the Tomb of Salar and Sangar al-Gawli, believed to be built for Bäštāk in 1348.

Tankiz built a tomb in 1330 in Damascus for his wife Khawand Sutayta, who reportedly requested a dome over her tomb and an adjoining mosque and hospice for women, suggesting that the non-funerary dome in the two-domed complex was used as a place of prayer by the hospice.

Bulbous cupolas on minarets were used in Egypt beginning around 1330, spreading to Syria in the following century. The ribbed stone cupolas of minarets were imitated in early stone domes, which increased in scale over time.

An apparently wooden dome from 1334 in a reception hall of the Qasr al-Ablaq palace of Al-Nasir Muhammad at Cairo Citadel is known from drawings of the ruins made in 1822. Al-Nasir Muhammad's dome over the Dar al-'Adl (1333–1334), a building dubbed the "Divan of Joseph" in a 19th-century engraving, was the most impressive of the Citadel. The dome of Al-Nasir Muhammad Mosque (1335) is the earliest extant wooden dome with stalactite pendentives. Such pendentives in brick or stone are not used until the middle of the 14th century. The transitional zones of the mihrab domes of the mosque of Sulṭān al-Nāṣir Muḥammad and the mosque of Altunbughā al-Māridānī (1340) were made of wood.

Examples of brick pendentives of the Syrian type, which act structurally as squinches, were used at the so-called mausoleum of Al-Minūfī in the Southern Cemetery of Cairo (early 14th century), which also featured a lantern at the top of the dome, and the mausoleum of Küčük at Aqsunqur Mosque (1346–1347). The domes of the tomb of Qūṣūn (1336) and the tomb of Khawand Ṭulbāy (1364) have transitional zones that create 16-sided and eight-sided bases, respectively. The dome of the tomb of Āqbughā min ʿAbd al-Wāḥid (1340) in Egypt is supported on corner arches that are filled with muqarnas facets, similar to earlier examples in Iran and Turkey.

Al-Nasir Muhammad reportedly ordered all royal buildings to be built of stone in order to prevent fire. In the first half of the fourteenth century, stone blocks replaced bricks as the primary building material in the dome construction of Mamluk Egypt, with the brick domes being only 20 percent of those constructed around 1322. Although they kept roughly the same proportions, the shift from brick to stone is also associated with an increase in the average span and height of about 3 to 4 meters, and a decrease in the thickness of the domes. The stone domes are generally 8 to 10 meters in diameter and 7 to 11 meters high. The domes were constructed in circular rings, with the sizes decreasing towards the top of the dome and, because of this, it is possible that elaborate centering may not have been needed. Collapsed remains of some domes has revealed a layer of brick beneath the external stone, which could have supported and aligned the heavier stone during construction. Although the earliest stone domes do not have them, horizontal connections between the ashlar stone blocks were introduced in the 14th century, such as those made of teak wood in a dovetail shape used in the Mausoleum of Farag Ibn Barquq. The stone domes were generally single shells except at the conical crown, where there is a gap between inner and outer layers filled with earth and rubble and which contains the bases of the metal spires. The construction of stone domes did not end the construction of domes made of brick or plastered wood.

Early Bahri Mamluk stone domes were imitations of Fatimid external ribbed brick domes, and decorative ribs would continue to be used in various styles. Examples include the ribbed domes of Ahmad al-Qasid (c. 1335), Tankizbugha (c. 1359), Ulgay al-Yusufi (1373), Madrasa of Aytmish al-Bajasi (1383-1384), and Yunis Dawadar (1382). Early stone domes were sometimes plastered externally and internally. Examples include al-Qāșid (c. 1335) and the Madrasa of Tatar al-Hijaziya (1348–1360). Decoration for these first stone domes was initially the same external ribbing as earlier brick domes, and such brick domes would continue to be built throughout the Mamluk period, but more elaborate patterns of carving were introduced through the beginning of the sixteenth century. Early stones domes were plastered externally when not cut precisely enough, but improvements in technique over time would make this unnecessary. Spiral ribs were developed in the 1370s.

The earliest type of stone transition zone was used at the Mosque of Aydumur al-Bahlawan (1346), a scallop-niche suitable for small domes. Others of the same type are at the Mausoleum of Sunqur al-Muẓaffar and the Mausoleum of Yūnus al-Dawādār (before 1382). The domes of the tomb of Bashtāk (1348) and the tomb of Tatar al-Ḥijāziyya have stone transitional zones.

Domes of the qāʿa of Muḥibb al-Dīn al-Mutawaqqiʿ (1350) and the tomb of Amīr Sarghatmish (1356) are supported by muqarnas zones of transition that create a 32-sided polygonal base.

Early Mamluk drums were faceted and wider than the domes they supported, sometimes blending with external transition zones. After the middle of the 14th century, domes have the traditional stepped exterior transition zone, although the interiors use a variety of styles. Examples include a dome on plain squinches at the Tankiziyya mausoleum (c. 1359), a dome on pendentive squinches at Madrasa of Uljay al-Yusufi (1373), and a dome on two-tiered curved squinches at the mausoleum of Aytmish al-Bajasi (1383). Drums become distinct from the transition zone in the late 14th century.

Stone double shelled domes were rare, but an example is that of Al-Sultanyya Madrasa from 1360. The twin-domes of the Sultaniyya complex (c. 1360) are unusual in that they have muqarnas at the base of their external ribs, a feature of ribbed domes in Persia. The two domes of the funerary madrasa of Sarghatmish are also double-shell domes.

The two domes of the funerary madrasa of Sarghatmish have muqarnas friezes on high drums. The wood and plaster bulbous dome over the prayer hall, since rebuilt, may have been inspired by two wooden domes over the Khanqah of Shaykhu. The narrow dome of Yunus al-Dawadar also has muqarnas at the base of its external ribs, the only example in Cairo other than that of the Sultaniyya Mausoleum.

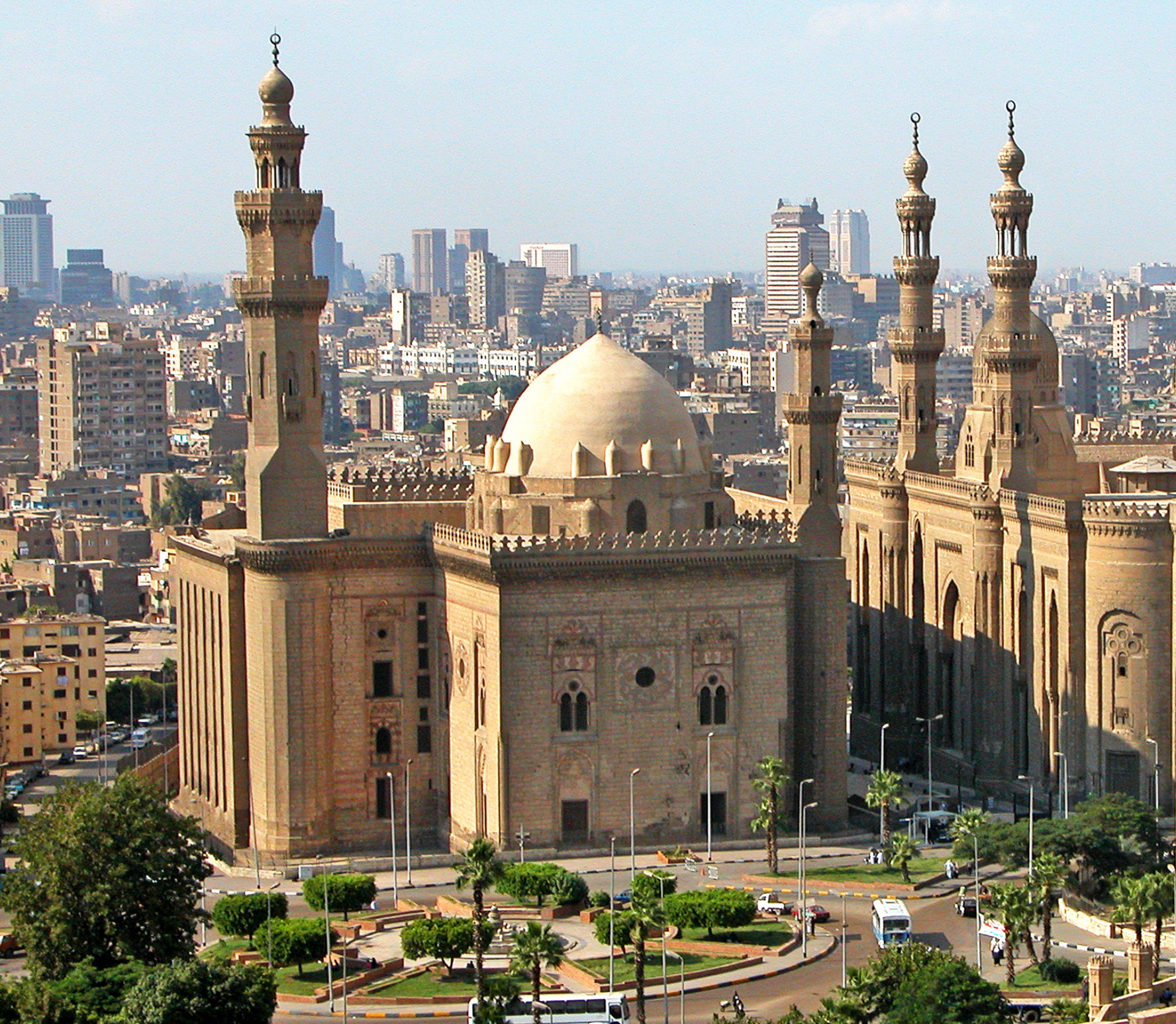
The dome of the Mosque-Madrasa of Sultan Hasan.

The Mosque-Madrasa of Sultan Hasan includes a dome with a star pattern made of inlaid tiles giving the appearance of ribs, rather than actual three-dimensional ribs, and was built from 1356-1363. Both the large dome in front of the mirhab and the large dome over the tomb were made of wood with wooden muqarnas transitional zones. The dome over the tomb of An-Nasir Hasan is 21 metres (69 ft) wide and dates to 1356. The wooden example at the Mausoleum of Sultan Hasan has stone arches behind the wooden pendentives to provide structural support. The earliest stone pendentives in Cairo were those in the vestibule. The dome over the entrance antechamber is supported by 11 layers of stone muqarnas. The dome over the tomb is supported by eight layers of wooden muqarnas, which may be the highest ever built.

After the mid 14th century, ribbed stilted domes became popular until the adoption of decorated stone domes.

The Madrasa of Umm al-Sultan Sha'ban (1368-1369) has two funerary domes of different sizes flanking a prayer hall. It was built by Sultan Al-Ashraf Sha'ban and dedicated to his mother. It uses plain squinches in stone.

The dome of the "mausoleum of Āqsunqur/Ibrāhīm al-Ansārī" (1370–1371) uses a hybrid corner support system that has been called a "pendentive-squinch". This hybrid system, with the lower part a squinch and upper part a pendentive, or vice-versa, would become common in Cairo beginning in the second half of the 14th century. The border of the supporting walls and the transition zone were often marked by a moulding or inscription band. Sultaniyya Mausoleum (1369–1370) is an example.

=== Burji dynasty ===
Between 1370 and 1400, stone transitional zones beneath domes became common and the number of muqarnas layers increased. Multi-foil arches that spanned the entire wall beneath a dome were first made. Examples include the domes of the tomb of Īnāl al-Atābakī (1393) and in the tomb of Maḥmūd al-Kurdī. The muqarnas in the tomb of Aytamish al-Bajāsī (1383) were made of stone, although stucco remained in use in other contemporary buildings.

The dome of the mosque of Inal al-Yusufi (1392-1393) had external ribs that looped together at their base, forming a chain-like band that would become the basis for more elaborate decorative reliefs on later Circassian domes.

The mausoleum of Tanibak al-Hasani (1394-1395) has two domes flanking an entrance.

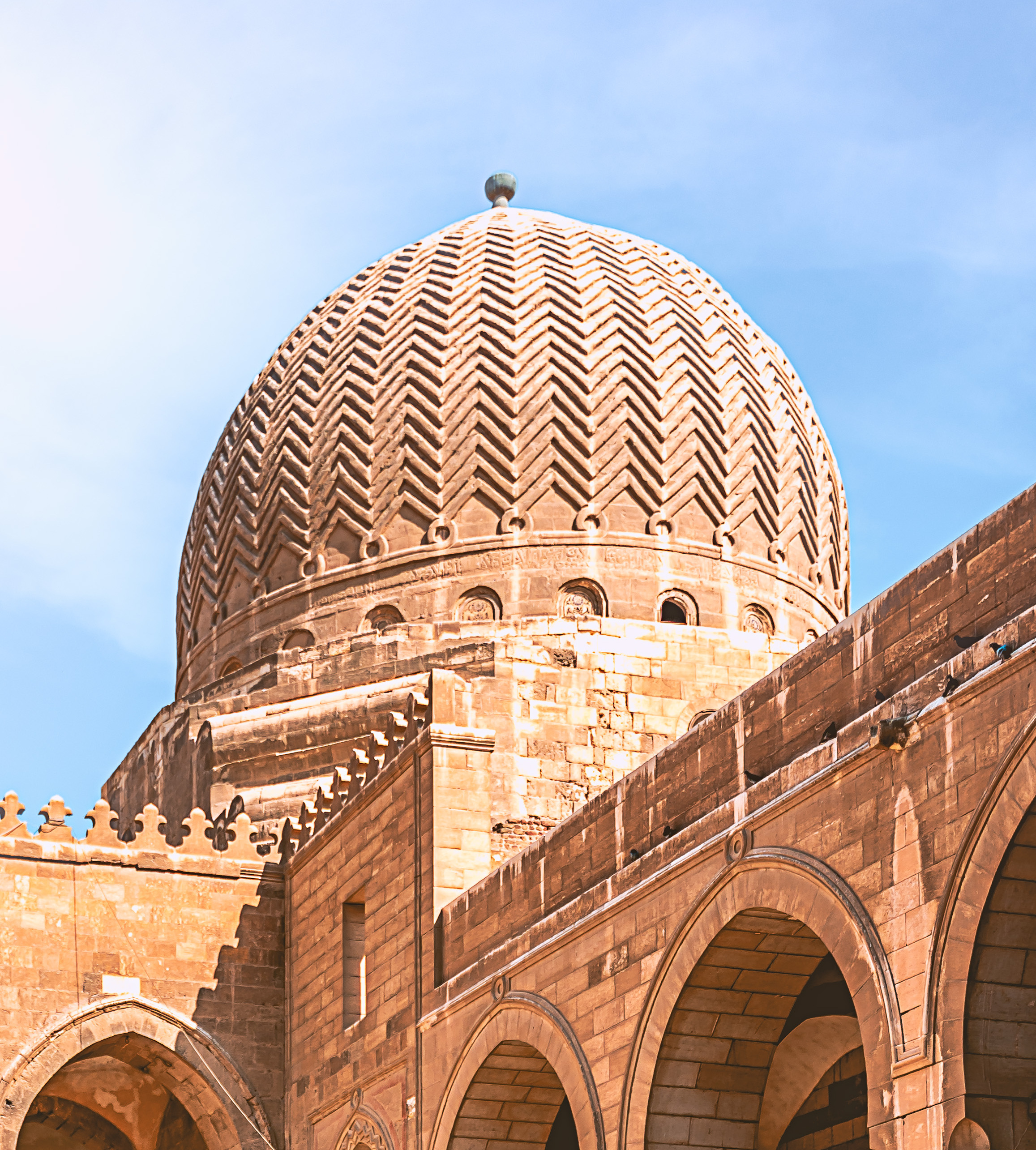
The Farag ibn Barquq

Zigzag patterns were common both by the end of the fourteenth century and again at the end of the fifteenth century. The first example of the zigzag pattern is on the dome of Mahmud al-Kurdi (1394–95), and at least fourteen subsequent domes also used it. The external decoration of Circassian domes developed from zigzag patterns to elaborate geometric and foliage arabesque patterns unique to each dome until a decline in the second decade of the 16th century. Examples include the domes of Farag ibn Barquq (1400-1407), Abdallah al-Manufi (between the end of the 14th and the middle of the 15th centuries), Qatbay (1474), Azrumuk (1503-1505), and Khayrbek (1502).

The traditional stepped treatment continued to be used for the exterior transition zones, but new "prismatic triangles, undulating mouldings, and chamfering" patterns were introduced from earlier use in the bases of stone minarets.

The two domes of the Khanqah of Faraj ibn Barquq cover square burial chambers and are separated by a hypostyle sanctuary. Undulating mouldings first appear on the external transition zones of the two domes of the Khanqah of Faraj ibn Barquq. The Mausoleum of Farag Ibn Barquq (1398–1411) was found in a 1960s restoration to have included teak connectors in a dovetail shape between its voussoir blocks. The two domes of the complex are the largest stone domes built in the Mamluk era and both have an internal diameter of 14.2 meters. The north dome was completed in 1405 and the south dome in 1411. The southern dome of the Khanqah of Faraj ibn Barquq (1400–1411) and the mausoleum of al-Mu'ayyad (1415–1420) used the hybrid corner support system that has been called a "pendentive-squinch", with the lower part a squinch and upper part a pendentive, or vice-versa, and had the border of the supporting walls and the transition zone marked by a molding or inscription band.

The dome of the funerary madrasa of al-'Ayni (1411-1412) was made of wood with wooden pendentives. Like other wooden domes in Cairo, it lacks the external stepped profile in the transitional zone.

The stone domes of the Circassian Mamluks in the 15th century benefited from the experimentation of the 14th century. Pendentives and pendentive-squinches placed above square bases became standard. Masonry domes in the 15th century typically had pendentives decorated with carved muqarnas, but the earliest used squinches like those used in the brick and plastered wooden domes that preceded them. The use of stone transitional zones is associated with an increase in height due to the layers of muqarnas facets increasing by a single facet as they rise to the base of the dome. This made the length of the corbeling in each layer equal. The tomb of Qānībāy al-Muḥammadī (1413), the tomb of Sulṭān Muʾayyad (1415–1420), the tomb of Jānībak al-Ashrafī (1426), and the tomb of Sulṭān Īnāl (1453–1461) have wall multi-foil arches supporting a drum arcade. Other examples after the 1460s have multi-foil wall arches that support a ring of muqarnas facets beneath the dome instead, such as the tomb of ʿUmar b. al-Farīd (1461), the tomb of Timrāz al-Aḥmadī (1482), and the 9-meter diameter dome of the tomb of Sulṭān Qāytbāy (1472–1474).

Although the tomb of Sulṭān Muʾayyad was designed to have two funerary domes flanking the sanctuary, only the eastern dome over the tomb of Muʾayyad was built. The western dome, intended to cover the tomb of his daughter, was never built.

The first prismatic triangles and the first chamfering used in dome external transition zones are on the tomb of Ğānibäk al-Ašrafī in Cairo's eastern cemetery (1427).

The maqam of Nabi Rubin dates from the Mamluk period and includes a domed chamber. The semi-elliptical profile dome rests on an octagonal drum on four corner squinches separated by four blind arches.

In the fifteenth century, interlaced star and floral designs were used on domes in a tiled pattern. The uniqueness of a pattern on a mausoleum dome helped to associate that dome with the individual buried there. The patterns appear to have been carved after the dome had been built, although alignment of the design with the vertical joints of the stone blocks suggests coordination between the cutting of the blocks and the design of the decorative pattern prior to construction, or using the grid of stone joints to align the repetition of the pattern but not the pattern itself. Evidence for the carving being done after construction is that the carving of the decorative pattern on the Mausoleum of Asfur (c. 1506) was unfinished in the first course of stones. Additionally, the floral pattern carved onto the dome of Azrumuk (1503–1505) does not align with the seams of its stone blocks. The undecorated outer surface of the dome of Qaraqmus (1507) was either intended to be plain or a planned carving was never started. The repeating pattern of decoration frequently does not correspond to the pattern of windows and blind niches on the drum below it. Wooden pegs that remain embedded in the mortar between stone blocks may have been used during construction to anchor ropes used to map out a tessellation grid onto the dome surface for the decorative carving.

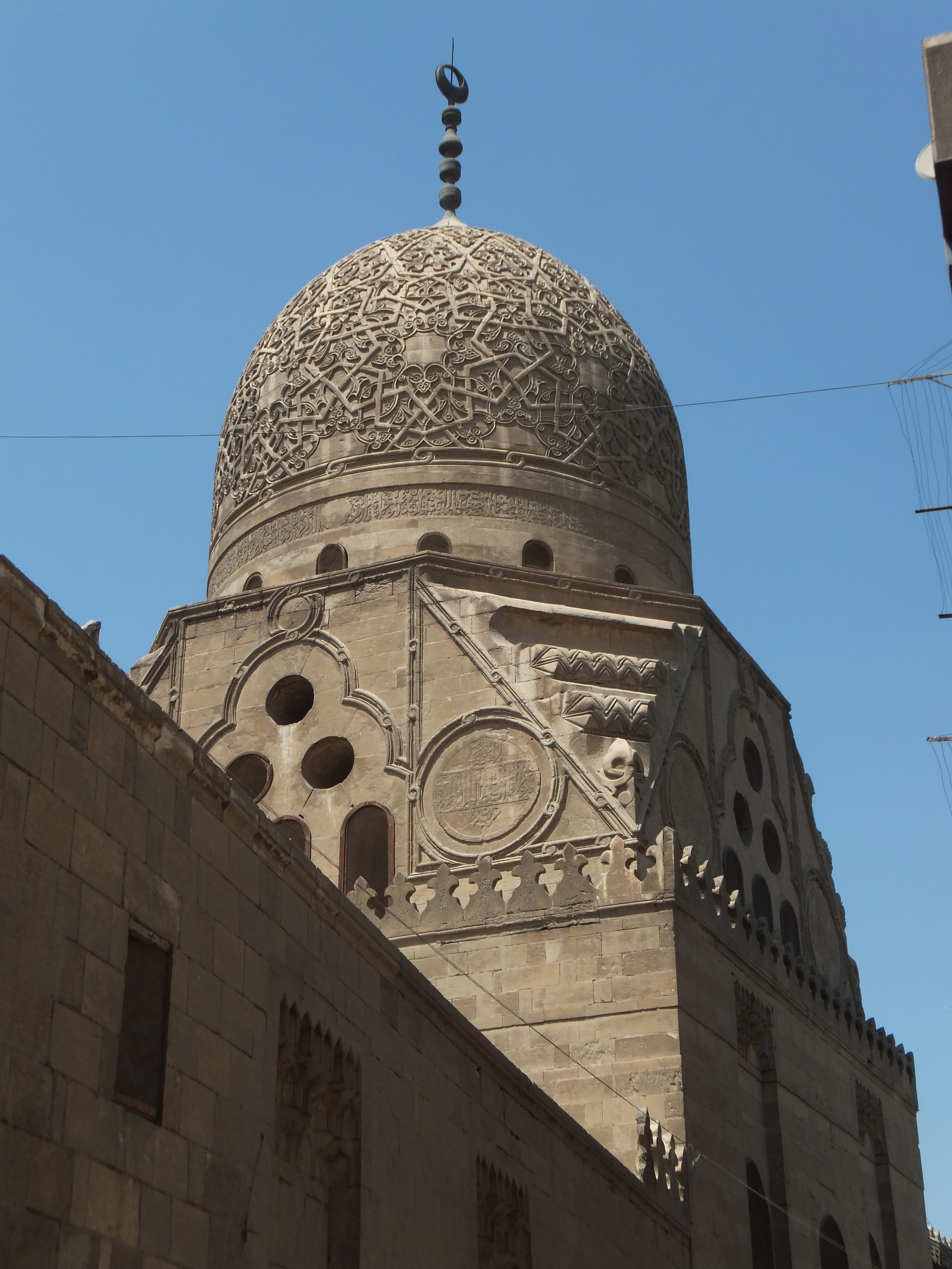
The dome of Qaytbay in Cairo's northern cemetery.

The first example of a dome in Cairo with a star pattern is the mausoleum of Barsbay (1432). A smaller dome in the Barsbay complex that also has a star pattern is that of the mausoleum of his amir Ganibek (c. 1432). The dome of Qaytbay in Cairo's northern cemetery combines geometric and arabesque patterns and is one of the finest. It interlaces straight-line star patterns with curving foliage arabesque patterns. Some of the patterns used on domes, such as chevrons, high-relief entrelacs, and star-patterns, were first used on minarets. The domes of the Hadiga Umm al-Asraf (1430–1440) and the Mosque of Taghribirdi (1440) used a high-relief pattern of interlaced mouldings first used on a minaret sixty years earlier. The muqarnas of the dome of the Mosque of Taghribirdi were made of stone, rather than stucco. The interiors of the domes at the Khanqah of Faraj ibn Barquq were plastered and painted and it is likely that later stone domes were as well.

The muqarnas of the domes of the mosques of Qāḍī Yaḥyā Zayn al-Dīn in Būlāq (1448-1450) and in Habāniyya (1452) were made of wood.

Domed zawiyas were built in the 15th century with squinches within the rectangular space, rather than above it in a separate transitional zone. Two examples were built in the 1460s by emir Janibak, two others were built by Qaytbay's secretaryYashbak bin Mahdi, and a domed zawiya was built by Shaykh Damirdash.

The dome of the tomb of Abū al-Ghaḍanfar al-Fāʾizī was rebuilt in 1462. The dome of the tomb of Imām Shāfiʿī was rebuilt by Sulṭān Qāytbāy in 1480. The style of the domes of the tomb at the mosque of Abū al-ʿIlā (1486) and the tomb of Imām al-Layth (1505) are in an older style.

Ablaq banding was never used above the drum of a dome, although it was used in transitional zones and for some vestibule domes, such as the vestibule domes of the Mosque-Madrasa of Sultan Hasan and the shallow iwan dome at the madrasa of Qani-Bay (1503). An exception to this rule may be the inner dome over the burial place of Muhammad and the first Caliphs in Medina, which was restored by Qaitbay in 1482–1483 and described as made "of black and white stone". The current outer dome is an Ottoman replacement from 1818.

A series of smooth domes was built in the last quarter of the 15th century, beginning with Prince Tamraz Al Ahmadi Mosque (1472). Most of the smooth domes are brick, but a stone example is the Mausoleum of Qurqumas (1511).

Prismatic triangles as full half-pyramids were first used at Amir Qijmas al-Ishaqi Mosque (1481). The first external transition zone to solely use chamfered corners was the dome at Abu al-'Ila Mosque (1485). The brick domes of Qijmas al-Ishaqi, Abu al-'Ila, and Sultan al-Ghawri had transitional zones made of stone. An example of brick external undulating mouldings in the transitional zone is at the Tomb of az-Zahir Qansuh Abu Sa'id (1499).

In the late Mamluk period, a transition zone was used with arches over the corners of the square bay that were filled with curved stalactites. The arches were either plain or three-lobed and there was no external zone of transition, making the domes overall lower and reversing the previous trend toward taller domes. Examples include the Qubba al-Fadawiyya (1479–1481) and the mausoleum of ad-Dašțūțī (1506).

Brick pendentives of the Syrian type, which act structurally as squinches, were used at the Cistern of Yaqub Shah Mahmandar (1495–1496). The building contains both a cistern and a mausoleum for Ya'qub Shah al-Mihmindar, with each marked by a dome. It also serves as a victory monument, with an inscription commemorating a victory over the Ottomans at Adana in 1486.

The tomb of Sulṭān al-Ghawrī (1502–1504) has thirteen layers of muqarnas in its transitional zone. The 12.3 meter wide dome collapsed in the early twentieth century. The dome was particularly tall relative to the height of the building's facade.

== Emirate of Granada ==
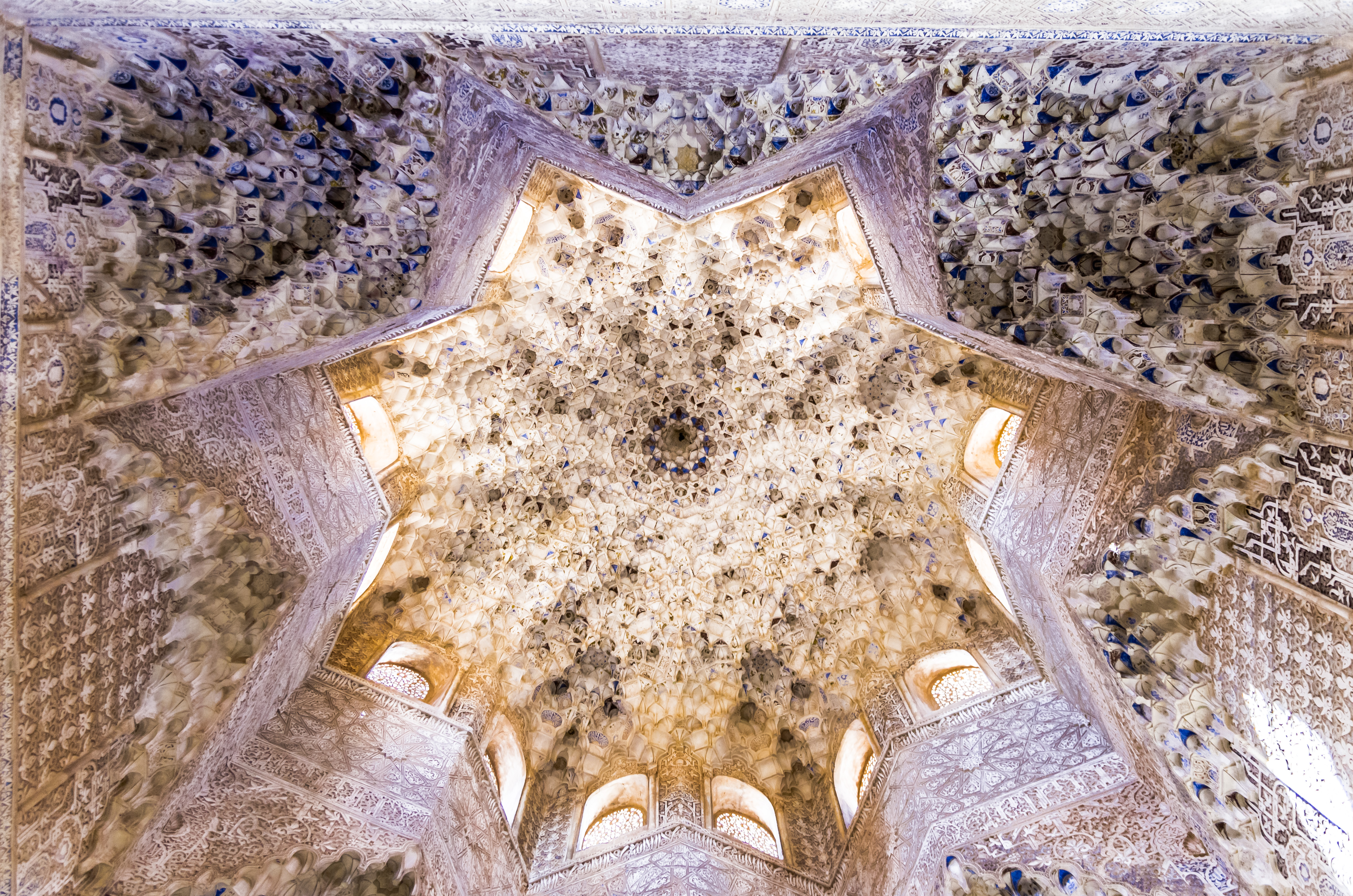
The Hall of the Abencerrajes

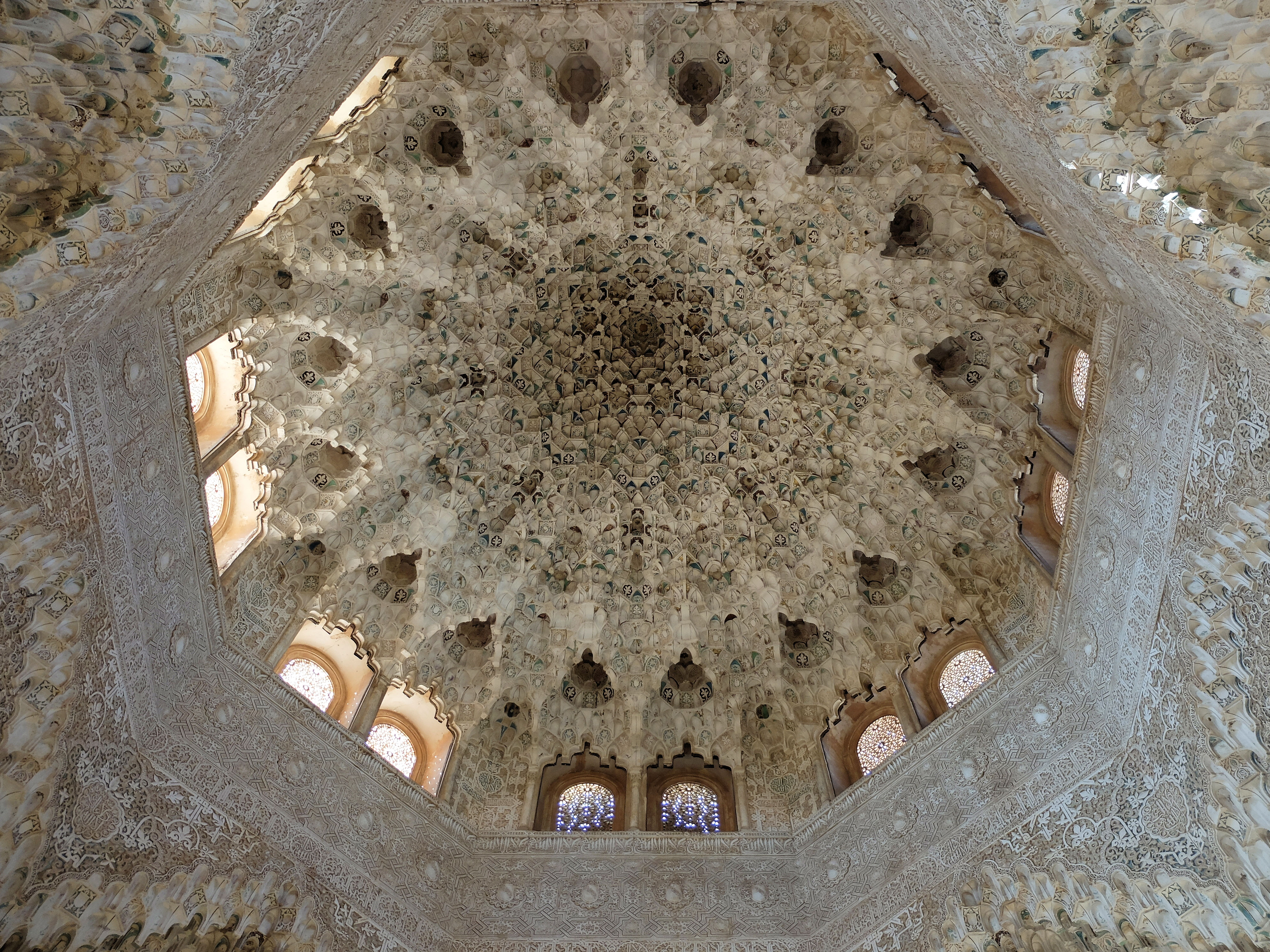
The Hall of the two Sisters

The architecture of the Nasrid dynasty used wooden domes over throne rooms. Star-shaped domes are found at the Moorish palace of the Alhambra in Granada, Spain, which contains domed audience halls built to mirror the heavenly constellations. The Hall of the two Sisters (c. 1333–54) and the Hall of the Abencerrajes (c. 1333–91) are extraordinarily developed examples of muqarnas domes, taking the tradition of the squinch in Islamic architecture from a functional element in the zone of transition to a highly ornamental covering for the dome itself. The structural elements of these two domes are actually brick vaulting, but these are completely covered by the intricate mocárabe stalactites. The lacy and star-shaped crossing dome of Burgos Cathedral (1567) may have been inspired by these examples, in addition to that built over the cathedral's octagonal Chapel of the Condestable (1482–94) in the Gothic style.

The dome of the Hall of the Abencerrajes uses eight squinches to form a Star of Islam that extends to a drum with sixteen windows. The intricate muqarnas of the dome are made of stucco.

The octagonal dome of the Hall of the Two Sisters has been called " the most extraordinary Muqarnas construction ever created". Four muqarnas squinches form an octagonal drum with sixteen windows. In front of each window, within the dome, are small domed hollows that form dark wells at the perimeter and divide the central dome into a sixteen-pointed star shape.

== Holy Roman Empire ==
=== Kingdom of Bohemia ===
A crossed-arch dome was built in Prague Cathedral from 1366-1367, with the spacing of the ribs widened so that a central square was formed, rather than a star. Additional ribs form a cross in the central square. The vaulting is part of the Wenzelskapelle by Peter Parler, who may have seen similar vaulting in England. It would later be imitated in Tuchoraz castle and the Heiliggeiskirche in Landshut.

The Karlshof Church in Prague (1371-1377), was built by Emperor Charles IV in apparent imitation of the Palatine Chapel at Aachen, but with a Gothic star vault spanning the 80 foot octagonal space. Charles IV had the chapel, dedicated to the Assumption of the Virgin Mary and St. Charles the Great, built to "elevate the significance of Prague as his imperial residence."

=== Kingdom of Italy ===
==== Republic of Pisa ====
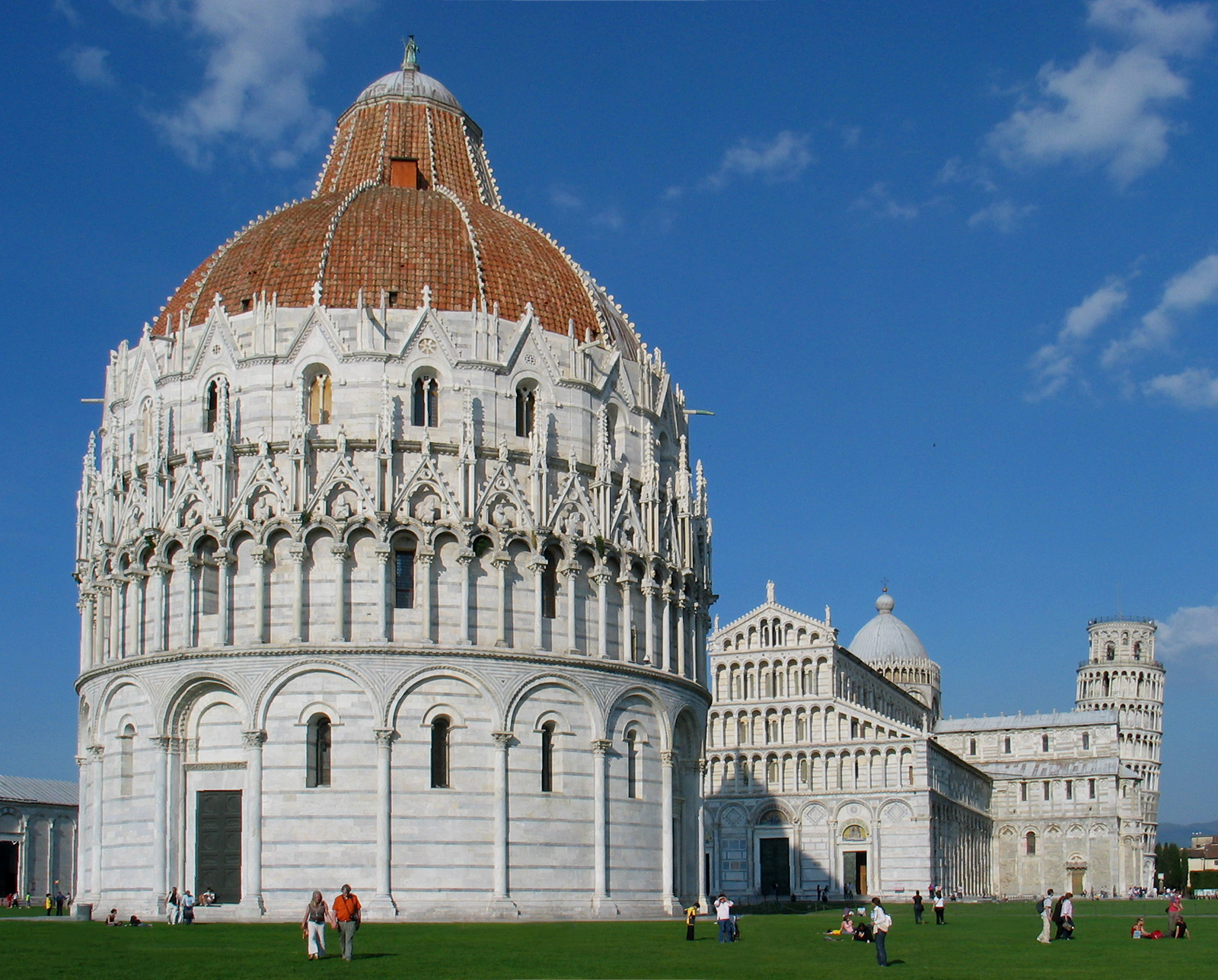
The domes of Pisa Baptistery and Cathedral.

Exposed domes were common in Tuscany and a source of regional distinctiveness by the 1380s. The exposed outer dome of Pisa Baptistery was built over its earlier inner conical roof in the 14th century. A small stone dome cap was added at the top of the conical roof in the 14th century, likely replacing a wooden cap. If an external lantern tower was also removed from Pisa Cathedral in the 1300s, exposing the dome, one reason may have been to stay current with more recent projects in the region, such as the domed cathedrals of Siena and Florence.

==== Republic of Siena ====
Rapid progress on a radical expansion of Siena Cathedral, which would have involved replacing the existing dome with a larger one, was halted not long after the city was struck with an outbreak of the Black Death in 1348. Its dome was originally topped with a copper orb, similar to that over Pisa's dome today, but this was replaced in 1385 by a cupola surmounted by a smaller sphere and cross.

==== Republic of Florence ====
The Baptistery of San Giovanni in Corte in Pistoia has an octagonal dome in the Florentine style.

A large octagonal dome may have been part of the original concept for the cathedral of Florence by Arnolfo di Cambio, who started building the nave and aisles in 1296. It was only a few years after the city of Siena had decided to abandon the massive expansion and redesign of their cathedral in 1355 that Florence decided to greatly expand theirs. A plan for the dome of Florence Cathedral was settled by 1357. However, in 1367 it was proposed to alter the church plan at the east end to increase the scale of the octagonal dome, widening it from 62 to 72 braccia, with the intent to further surpass the domes of Pisa and Siena, and this modified plan was ratified in 1368 under Master of Works Francesco Talenti. The preliminary design of this dome was completed by Giovanni di Lapo Ghini. Neri di Fioravante built the foundations for the dome. The construction guilds of Florence had sworn to adhere to the model of the dome created in 1367, with a "quinto acuto" pointed profile, but the scale of this new dome was so ambitious that experts for the Opera del Duomo, the board supervising the construction, expressed the opinion as early as 1394 that the dome could not be accomplished. Discussion in the fourteenth century revolved primarily around the cost of the project, and secondarily about the style.

The enlarged dome would span the entire 42-metre (138 ft) width of the three aisled nave, just 2 meters less than that of the Roman Pantheon, the largest dome in the world. And because the distances between the angles of the octagon were even farther apart at 45.5 metres (149 ft), the average span of the dome would be marginally wider than that of the Pantheon. In a measure used at the time, the inner span was 77 Florentine arms. At 144 braccia, the height of the dome would evoke the holy number of the Heavenly Jerusalem mentioned in the Book of Revelation. The design of the dome is very different from that of the Pantheon and it is unclear what the influences were, but it does share some similarities with earlier and smaller brick domes in Persia. In particular, the mausoleum of Oljeitu was a relatively recent precedent with a dome at a similar scale. By 1413, with the exception of one of the three apses, the east end of the church had been completed up to the windowed octagonal drum but the problem of building the huge dome did not yet have a solution. A design and model for the dome's wooden centering was created and preserved as a reference should it be needed during construction. In 1417, with the drum completed, the master builder in charge of the project retired and a competition for plans to build the dome was begun in August 1418.

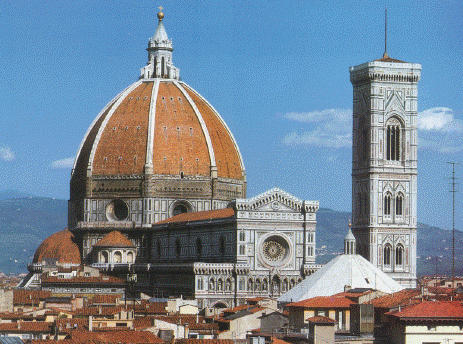
The Cathedral of Santa Maria del Fiore in Florence.

Filippo Brunelleschi proposed avoiding the problem of building an independent wooden scaffolding sufficiently strong to support the dome during construction, which may not have been feasible, by using lower levels of the dome itself to support construction of higher levels. To demonstrate the idea, he built a dome without scaffolding over the Ridolfi chapel in the Church of San Jacopo sopr'Arno. The brick model also demonstrated the structural feasibility of the thickness of the inner shell. Mathematician Giovanni dell'Abbaco was paid for advice and drawings in 1413, 1420, and 1425, likely related to the geometric requirements of the dome. Brunelleschi's plan to use suspended scaffolding for the workers won out over alternatives such as building a provisional stone support column in the center of the crossing or filling the space with earth, and he and Lorenzo Ghiberti were made joint leaders of the project to build the dome for Florence Cathedral in 1420. The octagonal brick domical vault was built between 1420 and 1436, with Ghiberti resigning in 1433.

Brunelleschi's dome, designed in 1418, follows the height and form mandated in 1367. The dome can be described as a cloister vault, with the eight ribs at the angles concentrating weight on the supporting piers. Over 32 meters in height, it remains the largest masonry dome ever built. The dome is 42 meters wide and made of two shells. The inner shell is about 2 meters thick and the outer shell is about 0.80 meters thick. A stairway winds between them. Eight white stone external ribs mark the edges of the eight sides, next to the red tile roofing, and extend from the base of the dome to the base of the cupola. Each of the eight sides of the dome also conceal a pair of intermediate stone ribs that are connected to the main ribs by means of a series of masonry rings. A temporary wooden tension ring still exists near the bottom of the dome. Three horizontal chains of sandstone blocks notched together and reinforced with lead-coated iron cramps also extend the entire circumference of the dome: one at the base (where radial struts from this chain protrude to the exterior), one a third of the way up the dome, and one two thirds of the way up the dome. Although generally preferred in Italy at the time, no visible internal ties were used. The layers of bricks curve up to the corners of the octagon, with each layer following radial alignments that created an inverted conical shape for the horizontal seams, like the layers of a spherical dome. The thickness of the inner octagonal shell allowed for an embedded virtual circular shell, about one fifth of the total thickness at the base. The use of a herringbone pattern in the brick allowed for short horizontal sections of the layers of the dome to be completed as self-supporting units. Impressions left in the mortar indicate that simple formwork boards were used to ensure the bricks did not slide while the wet mortar was setting. The vertical bricks in this pattern create voussoir shaped blocks of brick within the shell that allowed the entire shell to be supported by the action of circular compression.

At the conclusion of the Council of Florence on June 6, 1439, the ceremony of union between the Catholic and Orthodox churches took place beneath the dome of Florence Cathedral. In the Old Sacristy of the Basilica of San Lorenzo in Florence, the smaller dome above the altar is decorated with astrological depictions of star constellations that have been calculated to represent July 6, 1439 at about noon, the date of the closing session of the Council of Florence, in which the Articles of Union between Eastern and Western Christendom were signed by Latin and Greek delegates. The similar dome over the altar of the Pazzi Chapel, although of lesser quality, likely references the same date. The astronomer consulted for the paintings may have been Paolo dal Pozzo Toscanelli.

The first cracks in the Florence Cathedral dome may date to an earthquake on September 28, 1453, before the lantern was completed, although it is not known if those cracks were the same as those seen today. Only four major cracks have been observed on the inner dome, compared to about fourteen each on the domes of the Pantheon and St. Peter's Basilica. The cracks were first reported in 1639, in the centers of the four segments above each of the four piers, and ranged from 3 to 6 centimeters wide. The dome's weight causing horizontal thrusts on its supports, a differential settlement in the foundation, and the seasonal and daily changes in temperature have been proposed as causes for the cracking. The addition of iron hooping was recommended by a commission in the 17th century and by a committee in 1988, but was not implemented.

The dome of Florence Cathedral is not itself Renaissance in style, although the lantern is closer. The lantern surmounting the dome, also designed by Brunelleschi, was not begun until 1446, after his death. It was completed by Michelozzo di Bartolommeo and Bernardo Rossellino in 1467. Brunelleschi also planned for an external gallery, or ballatoio, to be built at the top of the drum where a strip of unclad masonry can be seen today. He had not worked out the details before his death, having been focused on the dome and lantern, but it appears that his intention was for a two-story passage with the lower story covered and the upper story open to the sky. In 1507, the commission for the ballatoio was awarded to Il Cronaca, Giuliano da Sangallo, and Baccio D'Agnolo, but only the southeast side was completed by June 1515. The unveiling of the finished section spurred criticism of the design, including by Michelangelo, who proposed an unsuccessful alternative design, and work remained suspended as the ruling Medici focused on other projects.

The combination of dome, drum, pendentives, and barrel vaults developed as the characteristic structural forms of large Renaissance churches following a period of innovation in the later fifteenth century. Florence was the first Italian city to develop the new style, followed by Rome, then Venice. The quincunx plan became popular in many parts of Italy from the end of the 15th century, often with a large dome on pendentives at the center of a square and four smaller domes at the corners. Domes in the renaissance style in Florence are mostly from the early period, in the fifteenth century. Cities within Florence's zone of influence, such as Genoa, Milan, and Turin, mainly produced examples later, from the sixteenth century on.

Brunelleschi first used sail domes in the portico of his Ospedale degli Innocenti (1424), and they became standard in his architecture. Brunelleschi's domes at San Lorenzo and the Pazzi Chapel established them as a key element of Renaissance architecture. The aisles of his churches of San Lorenzo (begun 1421) and Santo Spirito (begun 1428) were covered by sail domes.

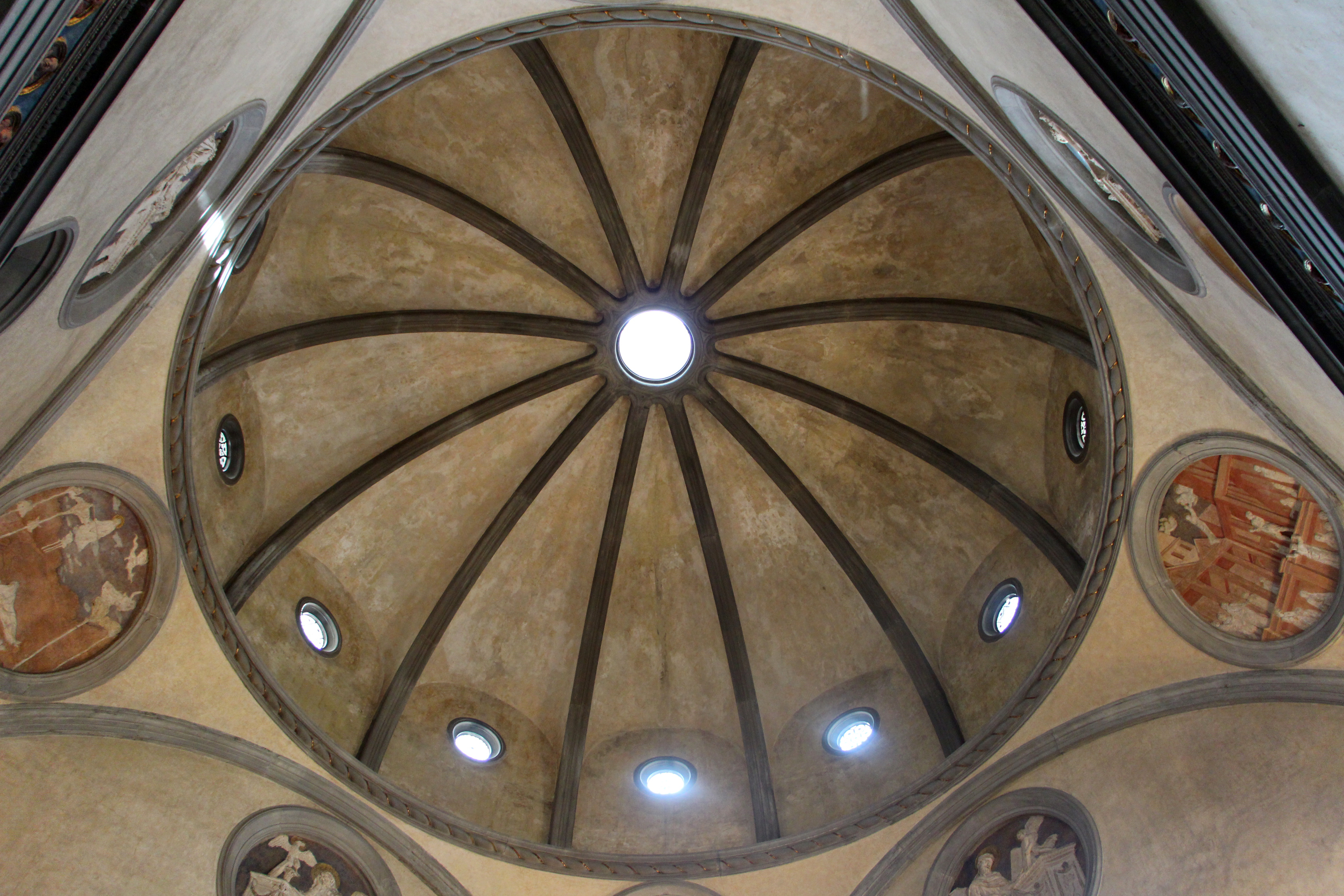
The Old Sacristy of the Basilica of San Lorenzo in Florence.

Brunelleschi's umbrella dome on pendentives over the Old Sacristy of the Basilica of San Lorenzo (1422–1428) became the archetype for later domed church crossings by his followers.

His plan for the dome of the Pazzi Chapel in Florence's Basilica of Santa Croce (1430–52) illustrates the Renaissance enthusiasm for geometry and for the circle as geometry's supreme form. Twelve ribs between twelve circular windows converge on a small oculus. The circular dome rests on pendentives decorated with circular medallions of Florentine ceramic. This emphasis on geometric essentials would be very influential. The dome of the Pazzi Chapel in Florence (c. 1420) can be thought of as a late example of a "double-chevet" Gothic dome.

Brunelleschi's Santa Maria degli Angeli in Florence was designed in 1434 with a 16.7 meter span.

The Santissima Annunziata in Florence was built by Michelozzo in 1444 with a dome diameter of 22.5 meters. It is said to be connected with the Caracciolo del Sole chapel in the church of San Giovanni a Carbonara in Naples.

The Cardinal of Portugal Chapel in the church of San Miniato al Monte was built between 1460 and 1468. The Greek-cross chapel is covered by a sail dome decorated with five blue and white glazed terracotta relief tondi on a patterned background by Luca della Robbia. The dome is covered by a simple sloping roof on the exterior. The background used illusionistic cubes made of yellow, green, and purple terracotta meant to emulate mosaic or opus sectile.

The cross-domed church of Santa Maria delle Grazie in Pistoia (1470-1484) has a form common to the Florentine Early Renaissance, but was not designed by Michelozzo.

The domed Church of Santa Maria della Pietà at Bibbona was built in the late 15th century. Begun in 1482 by Vittorio Ghiberti, the church has five domes over its Greek cross plan. The central dome is 13 braccia in diameter.

Giuliano da Sangallo's 1485 design of a dome on the church of Santa Maria delle Carceri in Prato is ribbed, like that of the Pazzi Chapel. The dome is 20 braccia wide at the center of a Greek cross plan built to house a miracle-working image of the Virgin Mary. It may have been influenced by the Badia Fiesolana (which has a sail vault at its crossing), Alberti's 1460 church of San Sebastiano, Mantua (the earliest Greek cross church built in the 1400s, which was planned to have a dome but ultimately built without one), the Greek cross Church of Santa Maria della Pietà at Bibbona, and the church of Santa Maria delle Grazie, Milan. The walkway around the interior base of the Prato dome has a balustrade with spikes to secure candles over every other baluster, which would have created a shimmering crown of light in the tradition of the devotional practices of using lamps or candles around ciboria and miracle-working images. Santa Maria delle Carceri in Prato marks the beginning of a "rapid succession of centralized buildings" that "continued with a whole series of churches dedicated to Mary in northern Italy".

==== Duchy of Urbino ====
The Church of San Bernardino was completed in Urbino before 1481 as a domed trilobe mausoleum.

The cross-domed Church of Santa Maria Novella in Orciano di Pesaro is attributed to Baccio Pontelli (c. 1450-1492). The crossing dome protrudes externally from the cubic building.

==== Duchy of Milan ====
The cross-domed chapel at the convent of Santa Maria Teodote in Pavia (second half of the 15th century) contains late Gothic elements but marks the beginning of the type's popularity in Renaissance Lombardy. It has a similar floor plan to the chapel at San Satiro but with domes in the corners.

Milan was an active center of dome construction in the second half of the 15th century. The local traditions were blended with the styles of Brunelleschi to create examples such as the Church of Santa Maria in Bressanoro, Santa Maria presso San Celso, the Colleoni Chapel, the Brivio Chapel, and the Portinari Chapel. The Portinari Chapel, Colleoni Chapel, and Brivio Chapel used a large square block to support a timburio. Bramante's small Cascina Pozzobonelli chapel also used a cubic type, similar to the Old Sacristy of Brunelleschi.

In Lombardy, both octagonal and circular domes used ribs as late as the 1490s. Examples include the Portinari Chapel at the Basilica of Sant'Eustorgio, the church of Certosa di Pavia (1396–1473), the church of Santa Maria Bressanoro at Castelleone, Milan Cathedral, and the church of Santa Maria della Croce.

Donato Bramante's dome of Santa Maria presso San Satiro was the first Lombard "ribless hemispherical cupola with coffers". The church includes different types of domes in its transept, sacristy, and chapel.

Leonardo da Vinci, Bramante, and others were involved in Pavia Cathedral, construction of which began in 1488.

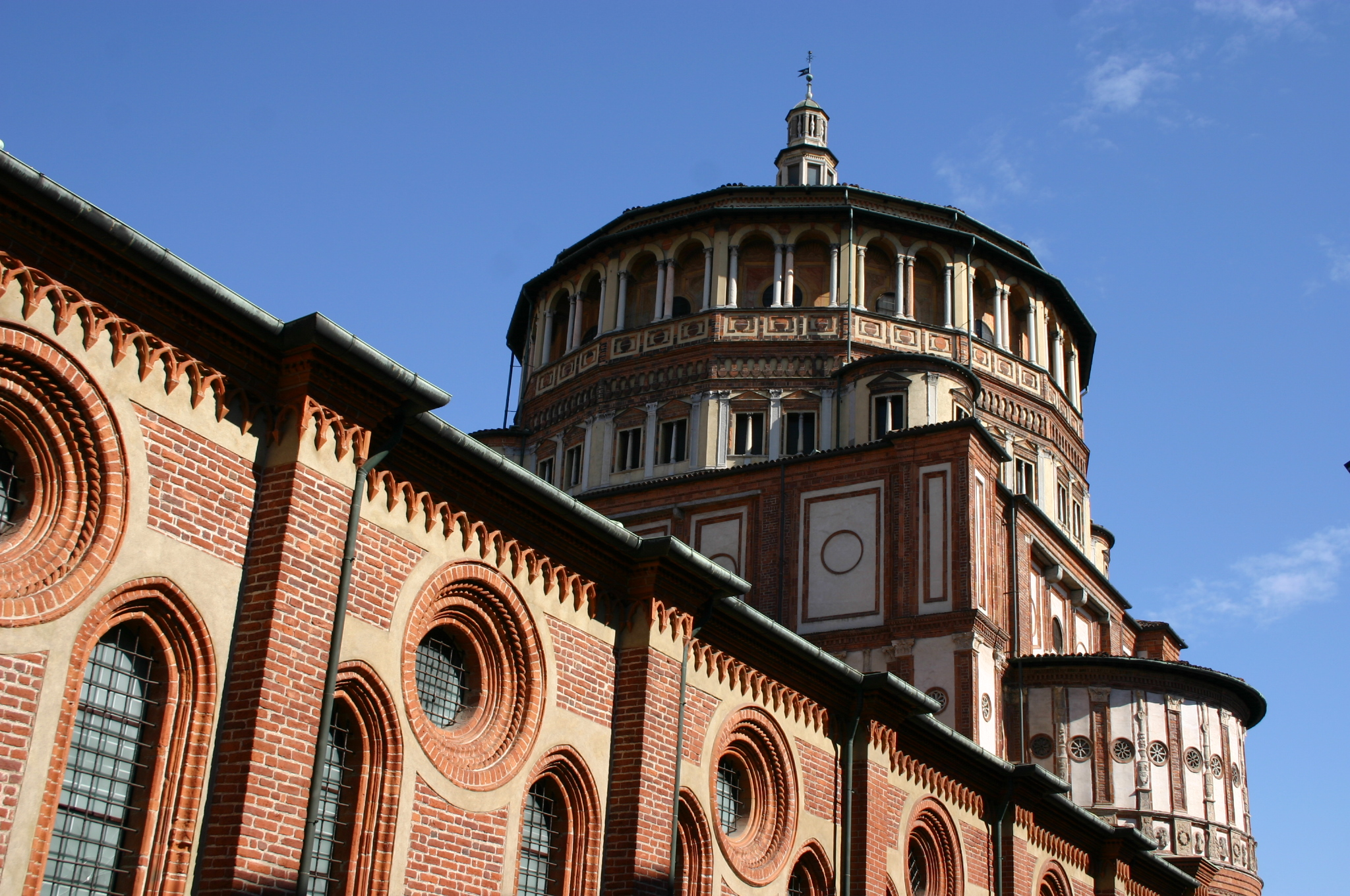
Santa Maria delle Grazie in Milan.

The church of Santa Maria delle Grazie was Bramante's last domed work in Milan. The burial church of the House of Sforza, Santa Maria delle Grazie was begun in 1492 and by 1497 was completed to the upper gallery of the timburio. It is similar to the earlier Church of San Bernardino in Urbino in that it is also a domed trilobe mausoleum. However, the smooth, almost-hemispherical dome without ribs and the sixteen-sided timburio with two galleries and a pitched roof are clearly modeled on the earlier Church of San Lorenzo in Milan, called the "Milanese Pantheon", and the interior arrangement is similar to that of the Portinari Chapel.

Domed tower finials at Sforza Castle in Milan (1492) and Vigevano (1494) have been proposed as inspiring similar structures in Silesia.

From the late 15th century, semicircular arches became preferred in Milan, but round domes were less successful due to structural difficulties compared to those with pointed profiles.

=== Duchy of Austria ===
The south tower of Vienna Cathedral includes crossed-arch vaults in the octagonal spaces of the tower. One of them reproduces the Islamic pattern of ribs found at the Mosque–Cathedral of Córdoba, the only such example in 15-16th century Central Europe, while another interrupts the central portion with another star pattern.

=== Imperial cities ===
Crossed-arch vaults were built in the towers of Esslinger Frauenkirche and St Theobald's Church in Thann. Unlike the vaults at the Mosque–Cathedral of Córdoba, the ribs are interrupted in the center with another star vault.

== Kingdom of Naples ==
The domed Church of Saints Cosimo and Damiano in Nardò and Church of Santa Filomena in Cariati have been dated to the fifteenth century.

The vault of the Caracciolo del Sole chapel in the church of San Giovanni a Carbonara in Naples (post-1427) has been cited as the model for the octagonal umbrella-like Gothic vault of the chapel of Balzo Orsini in the Basilica of Saint Catherine of Alexandria in Galatina (c. 1459). However, alternative influences may be the gothic apses of the Angevin period, the Hall of the Barons in Castel Nuovo, or the Chapel of Saint Ildephonsus (14th century) in Toledo Cathedral.

The Tolosa Chapel (c. 1492-1495) in the church of Sant'Anna dei Lombardi has terracotta reliefs in the pendentives of its dome.

== Crown of Castile ==
=== Kingdom of Castile ===
A crossed-arch dome of in the Mosque–Cathedral of Córdoba dates to the 14th century.

In the mudéjar style of Seville after the Christian reconquest of the city, a kind of dome made of intricately interlaced pieces of painted and gilded wood was known as a media naranja, or "half orange". The most famous example covers the "Hall of the Ambassadors" throne room in the Royal Palace Complex of Seville, a 10 meter wide space built in 1427. Octagonal segmented domes on squinches were characteristic of mudéjar architecture and examples in Seville in the 13th and 14th centuries with ribs that are decorative, rather than structural, are called boveda esquifada.

== Crown of Aragon ==
=== Kingdom of Aragon ===
The crossed-arch dome of San Pablo in Zaragoza dates to the 14th century.

=== Kingdom of Valencia ===
The octagonal dome, or cimborio, of the Cathedral of Valencia was completed around 1430 by Nicolás de Autún and Martí LLobet. The eight ogival arches of the dome spring from the top of a tier of windows filled with Gothic tracery and alabaster panels. A second taller tier of windows support eight additional shallower ribs to complete the vault. The dome and two tiers of windows are supported on four piers with squinches. The light structure has required periodic repairs, starting after an earthquake in 1396. In 1978, reinforced concrete slab was added to the roof and metal bracing was added to the oculus, the second tier of window arches, and at the level of the squinches.

== Kingdom of Portugal ==
An octagonal gothic dome 20 metres (65 ft) in diameter was planned but never finished at Batalha Monastery in Portugal, to house royal tombs.

== Kingdom of France ==
The dome of Évreux Cathedral (second half of the 15th century) has been called a Gothic dome in the "double-chevet" style.

== Papal States ==
De re aedificatoria, written by Leon Battista Alberti and dedicated to Pope Nicholas V around 1452, recommends vaults with coffering for churches, as in the Pantheon, and the first design for a dome at St. Peter's Basilica in Rome is usually attributed to him, although the recorded architect is Bernardo Rossellino. Under Pope Nicholas V, construction started between 1451 and 1455 on an extension of the old St. Peter's Basilica to create a Latin cross plan with a dome and lantern 100 braccia high over a crossing 44 braccia wide (about 24.5 meters wide). Little more than foundations and part of the choir walls were completed before work stopped with the death of Nicholas V. This innovation would culminate in Bramante's 1505–6 projects for a wholly new St. Peter's Basilica, and throughout the sixteenth century the Renaissance set of dome and barrel vault would displace use of Gothic ribbed vaults.

The segmental dome of Nicolas V's Church of San Teodoro al Palatino in Rome (begun in 1453) is the first known to be built within the city since the middle of the 5th century. Under Pope Sixtus IV additional domed churches were commissioned, such as Santa Maria del Popolo (1472–1478) with its octagonal cloister vault on pendentives, the domed Augustinian basilica of Sant'Agostino, and Santa Maria della Pace (completed around 1490), also an octagonal cloister vault but over an octagonal foundation.

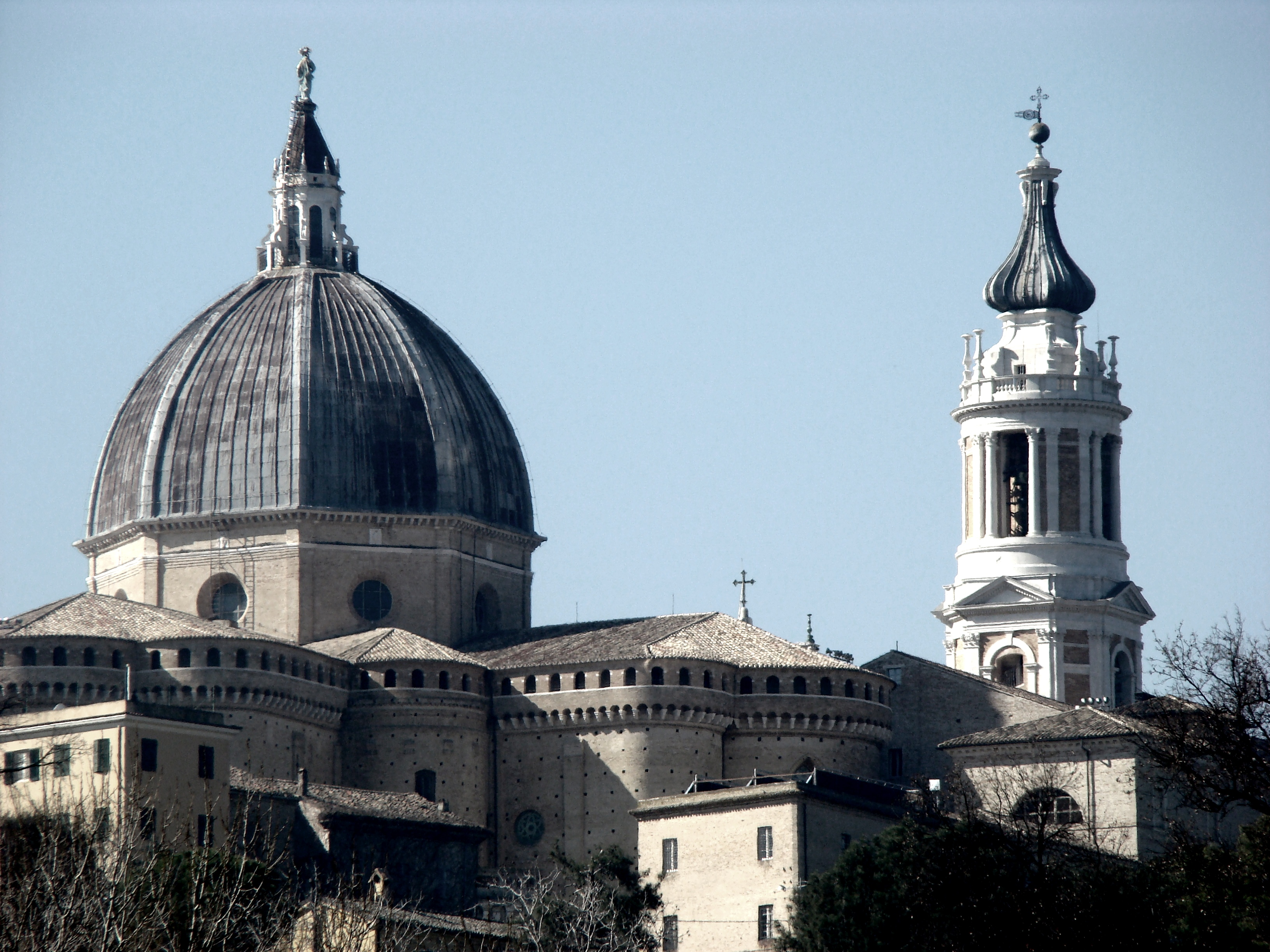
The Basilica of the Holy House at Loreto.

Begun in 1469, the Basilica of the Holy House at Loreto has an octagonal dome with a Gothic profile similar to that of Florence Cathedral. The dome was built by Giuliano da Sangallo from 1499 to 1500, using a herringbone pattern brick structure containing two iron chains to resist outward thrust. The four towers at the corners of the crossing also contain octagonal cloister vaults at their intermediate level. The central dome is above a structure encased in marble that is purported to be Mary's house, translated from Nazareth to Loreto. The dome over the sacristy, called the Cappella del Tesoro, was painted by Melozzo around 1480 and depicts eight seated prophets around the base of the dome and eight angels in an illusionistic style.

A number of illusionistic dome frescos were painted by Melozzo and his followers in the region. The dome of the Cappella Acconci at the church of San Biagio in Forlì, destroyed in the Second World War, was completed by Marco Palmezzano around 1500 and depicted the legend of the Roman Emperor Augustus seeing a vision of Virgin and child.

The lower supporting structure of Montefiascone Cathedral, begun in 1483, includes an octagonal ambulatory vault surrounding a central octagonal dome 11 meters high. It was made a church dedicated to St. Felicita in 1954. The dimensions of the upper church dome, completed in the seventeenth century, were established in 1483 and may have been intended to have steep double-shell cloister vaulting similar to that of Florence Cathedral.

== Republic of Venice ==
The church of San Michele in Isola has a domed bell tower from around 1460.

Venetian Renaissance architecture, perhaps delayed due to Venice's political independence, was blended with the existing Venetian architectural tradition of Eastern influence. Pietro Lombardo designed the church of Santa Maria dei Miracoli (1481–89) with a dome over the sacristy. The masonry dome on a shallow drum and pendentives is covered by a taller outer wooden dome with a lantern. In the late fifteenth century, several small central-plan churches were built in Venice with low domes on pendentives in a Byzantine style, such as the churches of San Giobbe, San Giovanni Crisostomo, and Santa Maria Formosa.

Šibenik Cathedral uses a cross-domed design on its eastern end by Giorgio Orsini. The dome's arcades were completed in 1491.

== Low Countries of northwest Europe ==
In the fifteenth century, pilgrimages to and flourishing trade relations with the Near East exposed the Low Countries of northwest Europe to the use of bulbous domes in the architecture of the Orient. Although the first expressions of their European use are in the backgrounds of paintings, architectural uses followed. The Dome of the Rock and its bulbous dome being so prominent in Jerusalem, such domes apparently became associated by visitors with the city itself. In Bruges, The Church of the Holy Cross, designed to symbolize the Holy Sepulchre, was finished with a Gothic church tower capped by a bulbous cupola on a hexagonal shaft in 1428. Sometime between 1466 and 1500, a tower added to the Chapel of the Precious Blood was covered by a bulbous cupola very similar to Syrian minarets. Likewise, in Ghent, an octagonal staircase tower for the Church of St. Martin d'Ackerghem, built in the beginning of the sixteenth century, has a bulbous cupola like a minaret. These cupolas were made of wood covered with copper, as were the examples over turrets and towers in the Netherlands at the end of the fifteenth century, many of which have been lost. The earliest example from the Netherlands that has survived is the bulbous cupola built in 1511 over the town hall of Middelburg. Multi-story spires with truncated bulbous cupolas supporting smaller cupolas or crowns became popular in the following decades.

== Tahirid Sultanate ==
The Tahirids retained many of the innovations of the Rasulid dynasty in order to distinguish themselves from the Zaydis. The mosque of Malhuki (1499) has nine domed bays arranged three by three. In Zabid's government quarter, the madrasas of al-Kamālīyah (c. 1521-1523) and al-Iskandarīyah (c. 1531-1536) have central dome plans like those found in Taiz. Other similarities are the inclusion of a small hanging squinch beneath the larger squinch supporting the dome and painted stucco decoration in the transition zone. The patron of these buildings may have been the sultan or one of his family members.

== See also ==
- History of architecture
- Medieval technology
- Rib vault – Architectural feature to cover a wide space
- Pointed arch (architecture) – Arch with a pointed crown
