= Church of the Assumption of the Virgin Mary and St. Charles the Great, Prague =

The Church of the Assumption of the Virgin Mary and St. Charles the Great
- Kostel Nanebevzetí Panny Marie a svatého Karla Velikého
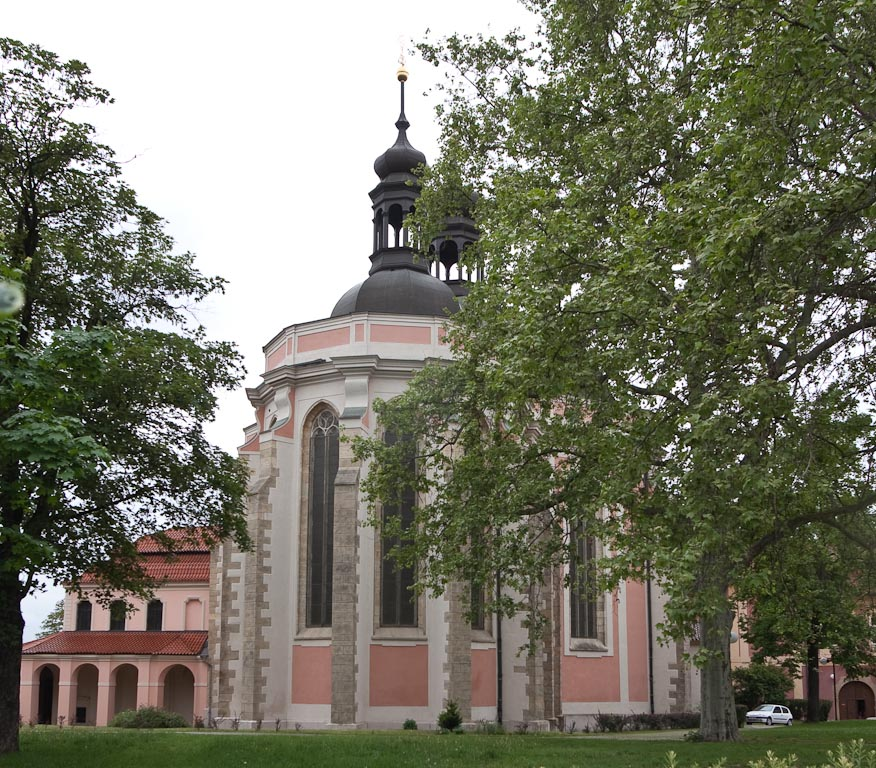
- Southeastern view of the church
- The Church of the Assumption of the Virgin Mary and St. Charles the Great
- 50°4′7″N 14°25′42″E
- Location: Karlov, Prague 2, New Town, Prague
- Country: Czech Republic
- Denomination: Catholic Church

History
- Status: Parish church
- Dedication: Assumption of Mary, St Charles the Great
- Consecrated: 1377

Architecture
- Functional status: active
- Heritage designation: National Cultural Monument of the Czech Republic
- Architect: Matthias of Arras
- Style: Gothic, Baroque
- Groundbreaking: 1351

Specifications
- Materials: Stone, masonry

The Church of the Assumption of the Virgin Mary and St. Charles the Great (Czech: Kostel Nanebevzetí Panny Marie a svatého Karla Velikého) is located in the Karlov area of Prague. The originally Gothic church was rebuilt and augmented in baroque style. The church is a part of the former convent of the Augustinian Order in Prague's Karlov.

== History ==
It was founded by the emperor Charles IV as a part of the convent of the Augustinian Order within the project of a big development of the New Town district. Such investments into the town's development were the result of the determination of Charles IV to enhance the City of Prague to match its new role—the capital of the Holy Roman Empire. The proof for this is the unusual shape of the church in reference to its patron. The octagonal floor plan refers directly to the main building of the imperial palace of Charles the Great in Aachen—to the Aachen Cathedral, that was erected on the hexagonal floor plan with an inserted octagon. The central floor plan of the church is very uncommon and seldom used in Gothic architecture. Documentation of the vaulting system has not survived; it is supposed that the main vault of the church was supported by the pillar in the middle or that it was the vaulting based on four columns.

The importance of the church is also proven by its dedication to St. Mary, the mother of Jesus and to St. Charles the Great, the reviver of the Roman Empire. Charles IV gave a valuable relic to the church: three teeth of Charles the Great.

The erection of the church began in 1351. Matthias of Arras and his building workshop took part in the construction. The richly profiled chancel arch, the antechamber as well as the north entrance to the nave repeat some of the stylistic features of Matthias already seen in St. Vitus. The church was consecrated by the archbishop Jan Očko of Vlašim in 1377 in the presence of Charles IV and his son Wenceslaus IV. It is evident, however, that the building was not yet finished by the time of the consecration. The construction of the convent itself apparently took much more time. During the Hussite Wars the church and the convent were damaged and abandoned. In 1498, after the reconstruction the church was reconsecrated. The church's vaulting was designed by Hans Spiess. Two remarkable stained glasses are dated 1502–1505.

The church was revaulted in 1575 by a boldly designed dome with a net of the pseudo-Gothic ribs, that was covered with the new roof. The vault was designed by Bonifác Wolmut.

In 1603, the buildings of the convent were damaged by lightning and fire. The church was then renovated and recovered with a new roof. In 1676, Mariazell chapel was erected in the center of the church; the sponsor was Bernard Ignác Jan z Martinic and the author was Giovanni Domenico Orsi. The chapel no longer exists. Orsi can also be credited with the harmonious Baroque decoration of the interior first floor rooms of the church.

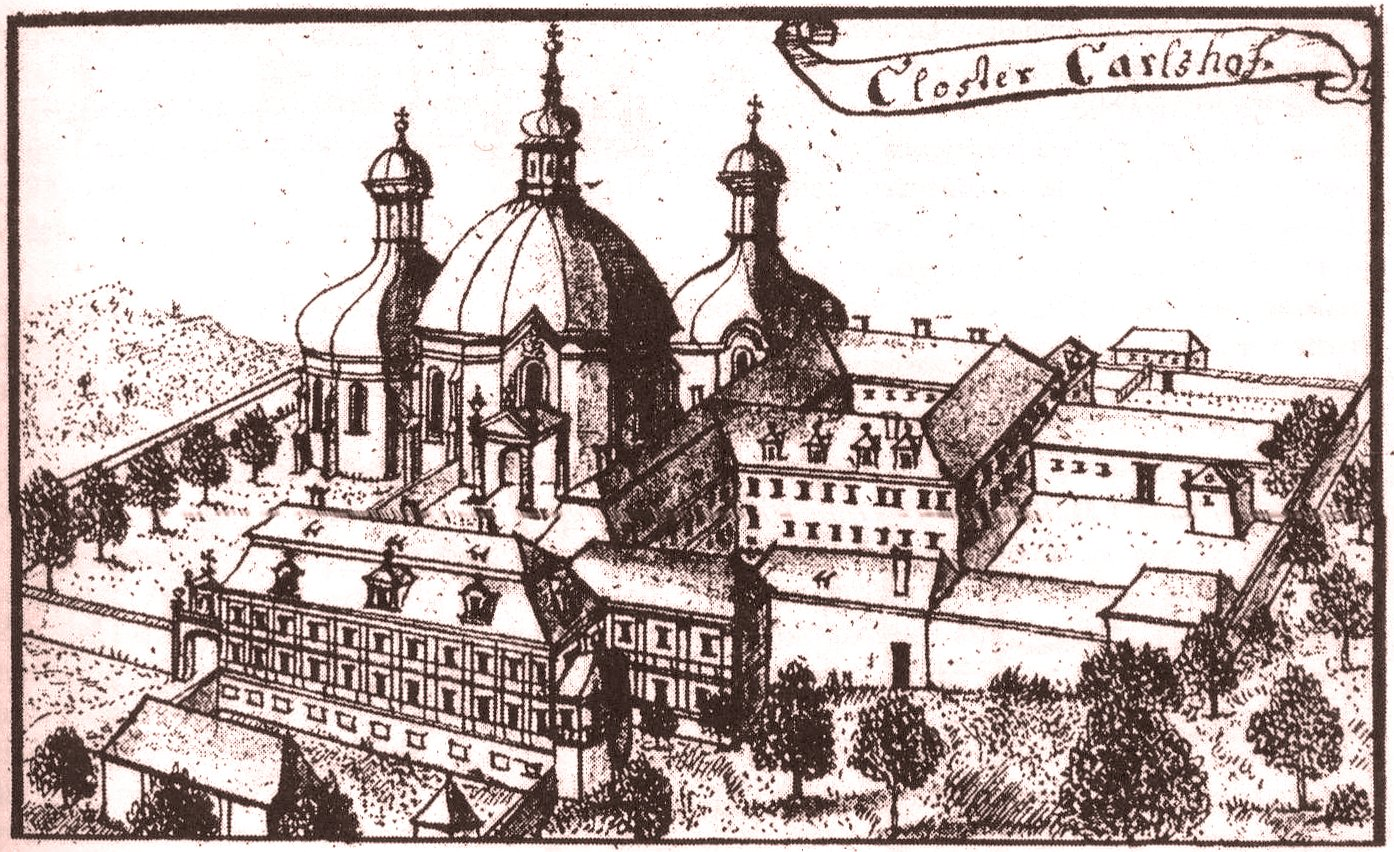
The view of the convent. Image from the 18th century

Early in the 18th century, partially thanks to the dominant location, the convent became a destination for pilgrims. Thus the old intention to build Holy Steps by the church according to the template of Archbasilica of St. John Lateran in Rome was executed after 1704 by the count of Schönnfeld. Porovost Luňák received building permission in 1708. The building was completed by 1711. Jan Santini Aichel was credited with the project in the 1730s. This theory was proven by several further investigations; however there is no archival proof for it yet. Beneath the "Holy Steps", Bethlehem Cave of the Nativity Chapel was constructed with trompe-l'œil stucco work on the walls.

The interior of the church underwent changes in 1735–1740. A new gallery was installed that enabled the installation of a new organ by Bedřich Semerád. The choir as well as two side galleries were built by František Maxmilián Kaňka. The Mariazell chapel was destroyed. A new pulpit, oratories and altars were added.

On the 22 April 1755 there was a fire in the whole convent. The damaged and destroyed roofs were renovated in 1756. In 1785 the convent was reformed into a hospital by Josef II. The substantial revival of the Gothic form of the church, that was intended in 1871–1873, was executed only in smaller part.

== Architecture ==
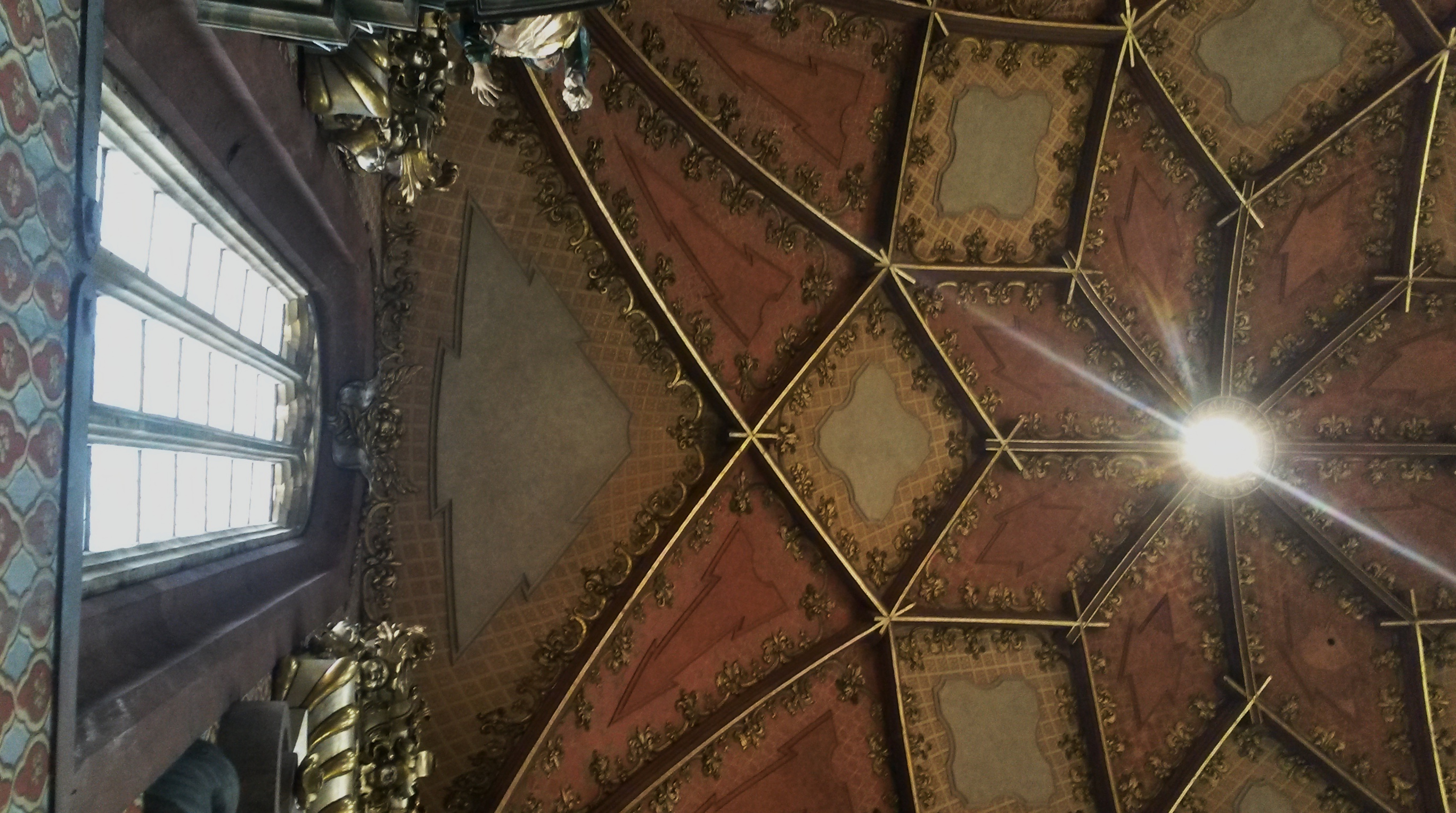
The view of the vault

The octagonal central nave is vaulted with Late Gothic brick vaulting supported by stone ribs that create the sophisticated star figure. The polygonal presbytery is enclosed by the six sides of the decagon and vaulted with the Gothic rib-supported vault. The vault is 22.8 meter in width. On the opposite side there is a bell tower adjacent to the nave. The nave and the tower are evidently reinforced by the external Gothic piers. The whole church is girded with the cornice, over which the attic is built. The nave, the presbytery and the tower have three baroque cupola-shaped roofs with lanterns.

The hall and the "Holy Steps" building are erected in baroque style. The windows of the first floor are shaped according to the template of curtain-shaped windows of Late Gothic architecture. Structural Gothic elements are abundantly displayed by the building and prove the Jan Santini Aichel authorship of the edifice. There are several other elements inherent to the architect's style. These are expressively articulated cornices, pillars on the corners, concave arches of the cloister that create swaying rhythm.

The interior of the church is decorated with baroque stucco and enriched by baroque furniture. Several altar paintings by Jan Jiří Heinsch are to be found in the building. The main altar however was built in 1872. Window traceries are also Neogothic.

== Interesting facts ==
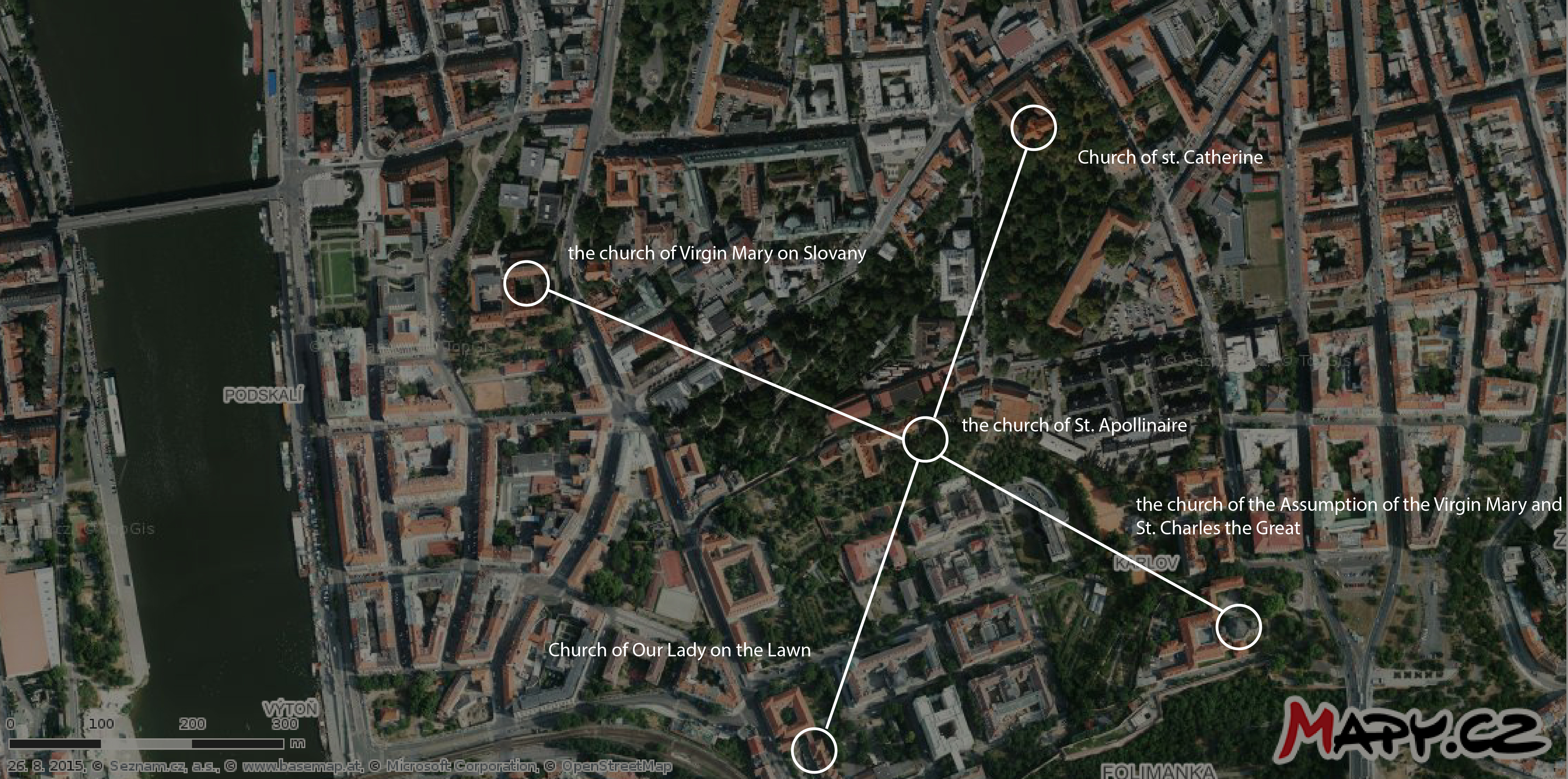
The cross of the churches

The five churches in the New Town district that were founded by Charles IV form a regular cross. The north-south axis is formed by the Church of St. Catherine of Alexandria and the Church of Our Lady on the Lawn. The east-west axis is formed by the church of the Assumption of the Virgin Mary and St. Charles the Great and the Church of the Virgin Mary on Slovany. The axes cross at the Church of St. Apollinaire.

According to tradition, the builder of the vault had a deal with the devil to finish the construction. When the builder saw the vault finished he was amazed by its size. Full of fear that the vault would collapse he hanged himself on the supporting scaffolds. The vault survived. The devil kept his word and got the builder's soul.

== Gallery ==
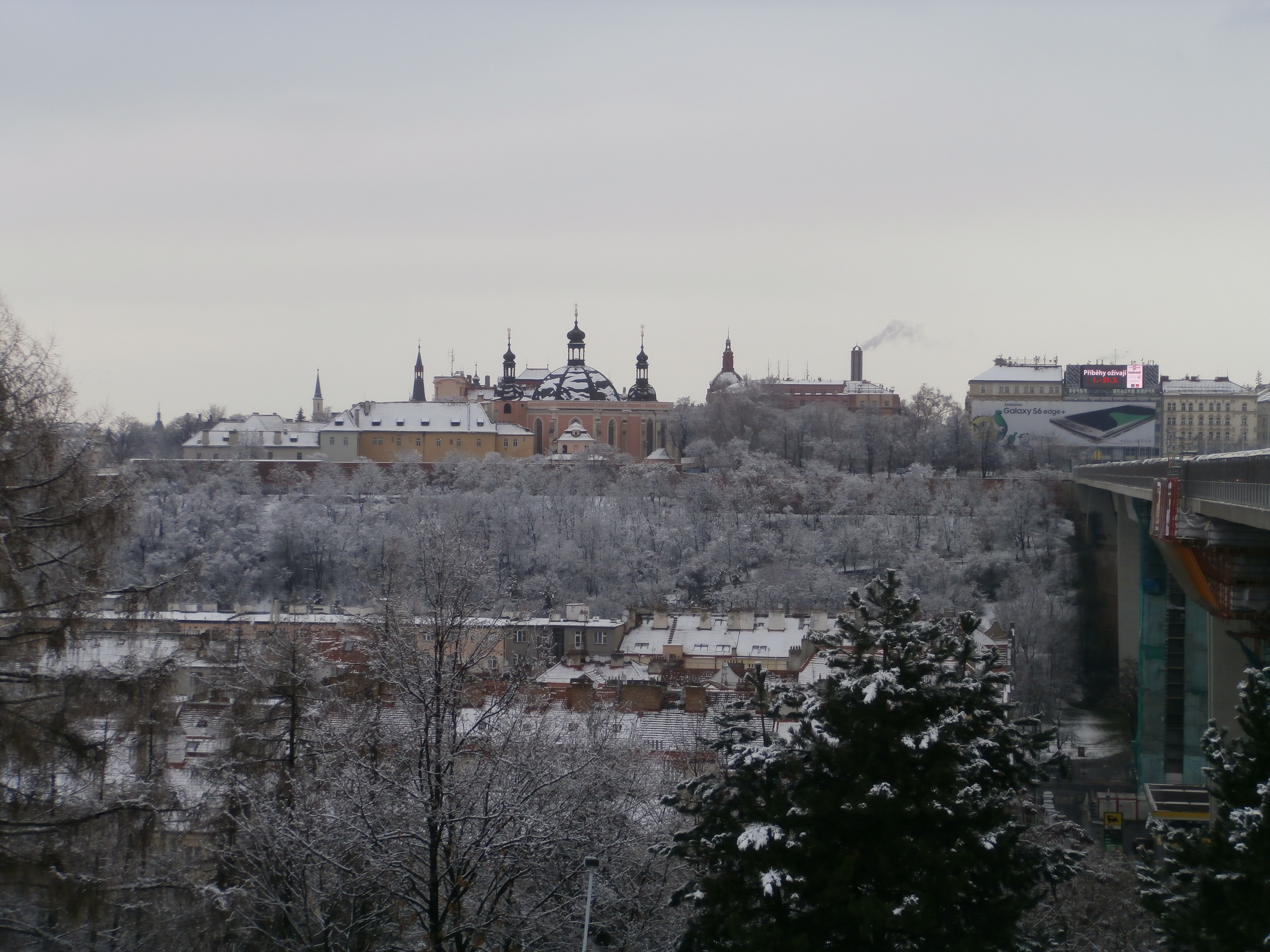
Southern view of the convent from Vyšehrad

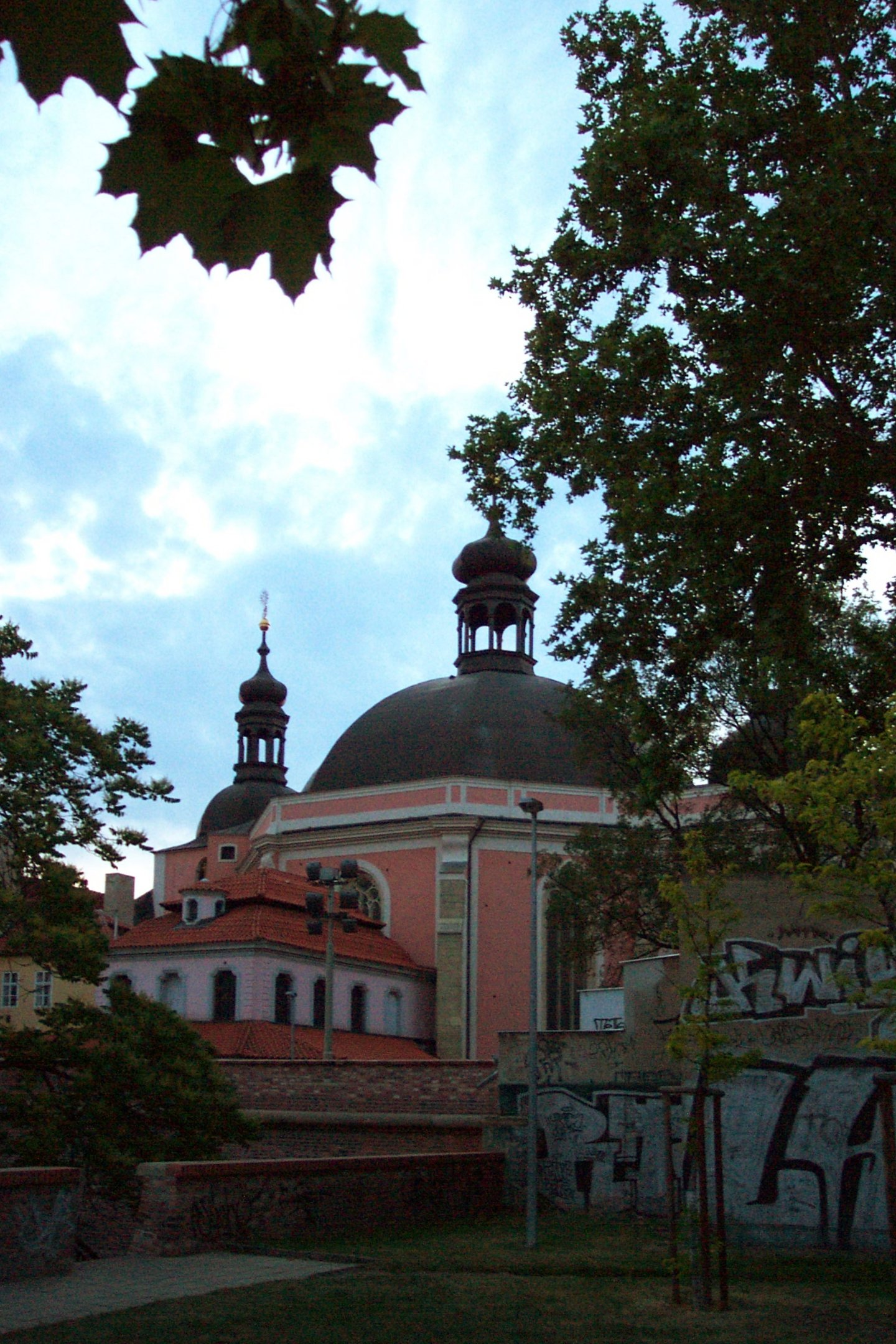
The "Holy Steps" building

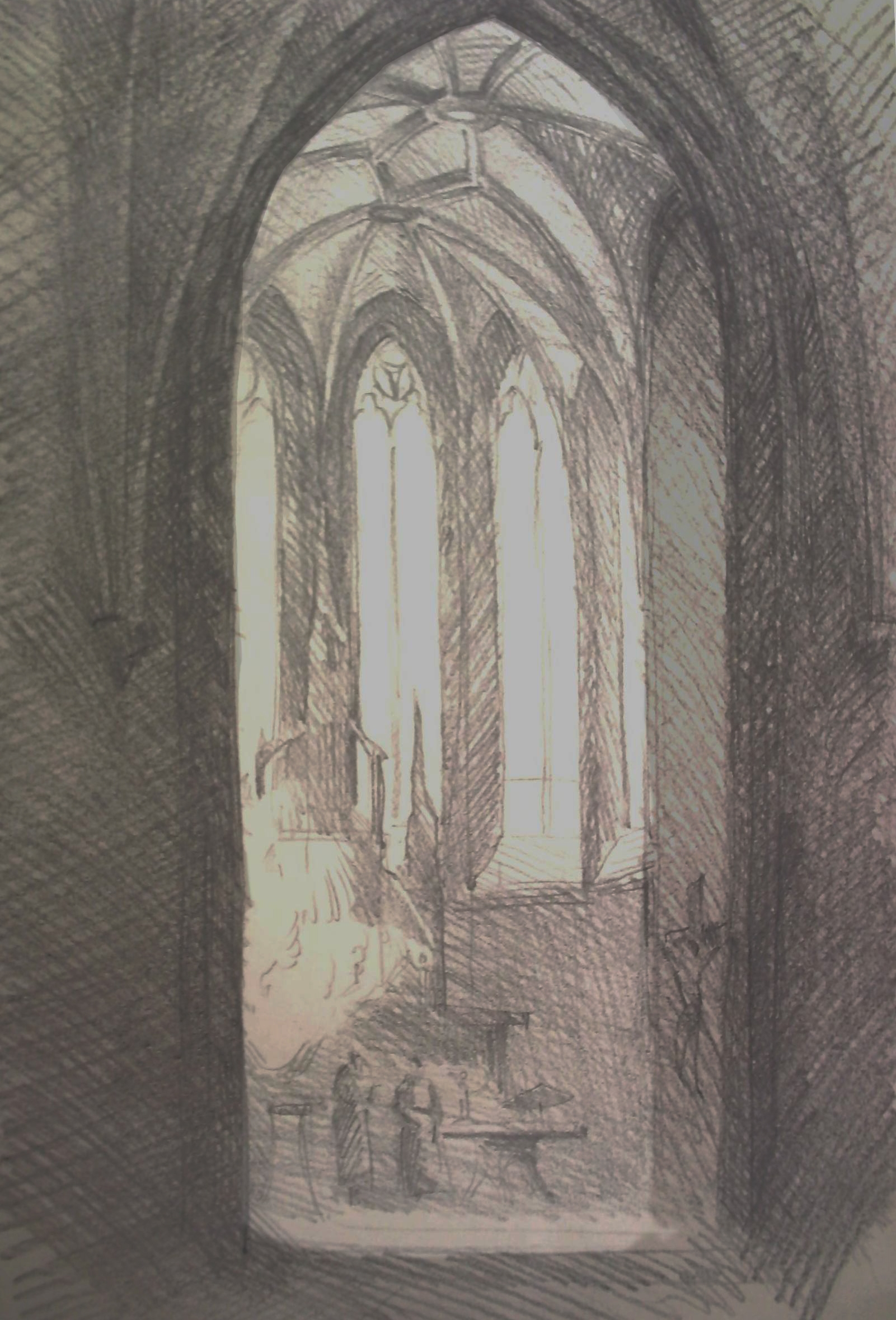
View of the presbytery

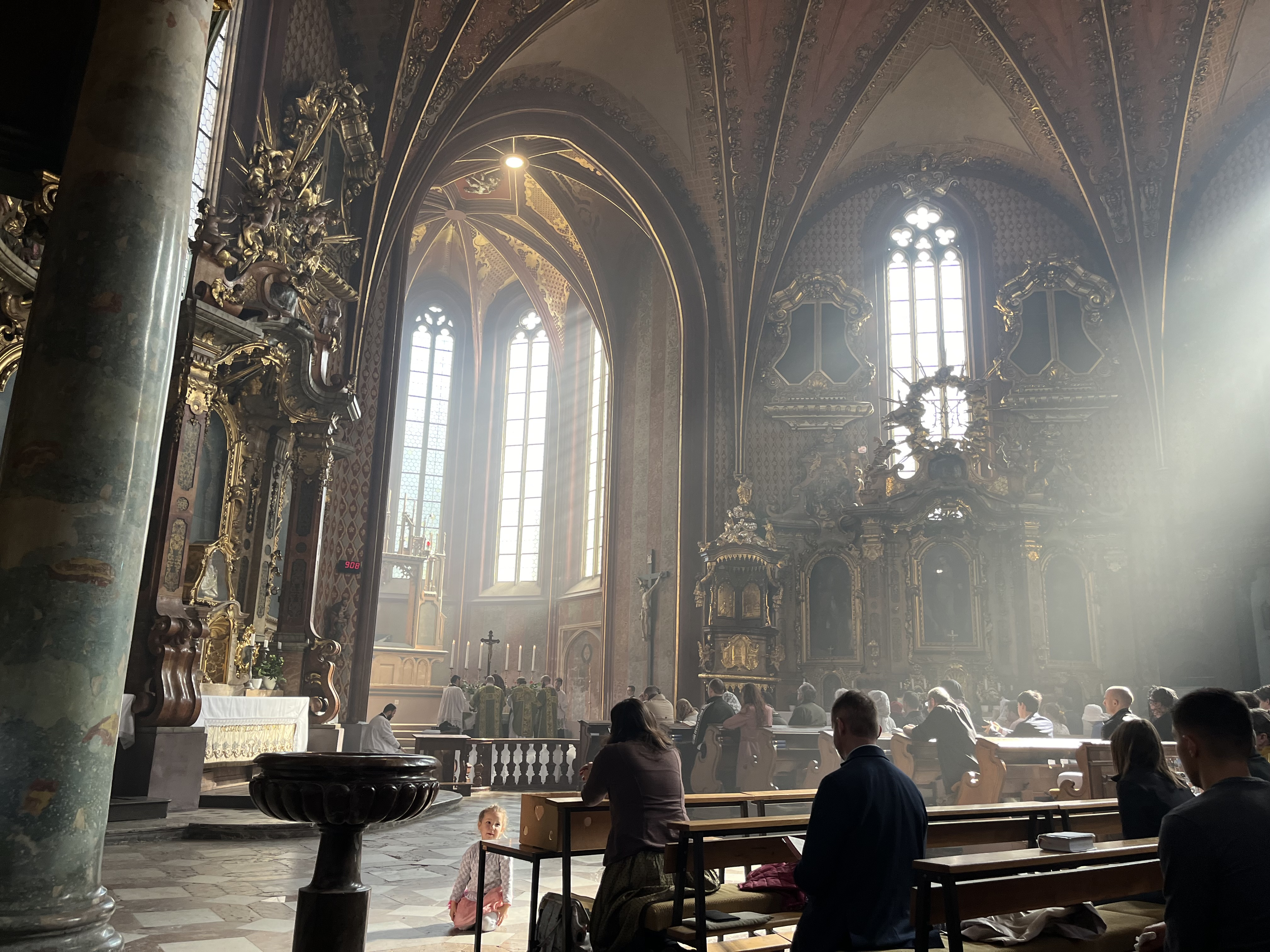
Traditional Latin Mass celebrated at the Church

== See also ==
- Late medieval domes
