= Santa Maria delle Grazie, Pistoia =

Catholic church in Pistoia, Italy

Coordinates: 43°56′9.5″N 10°55′11.1″E

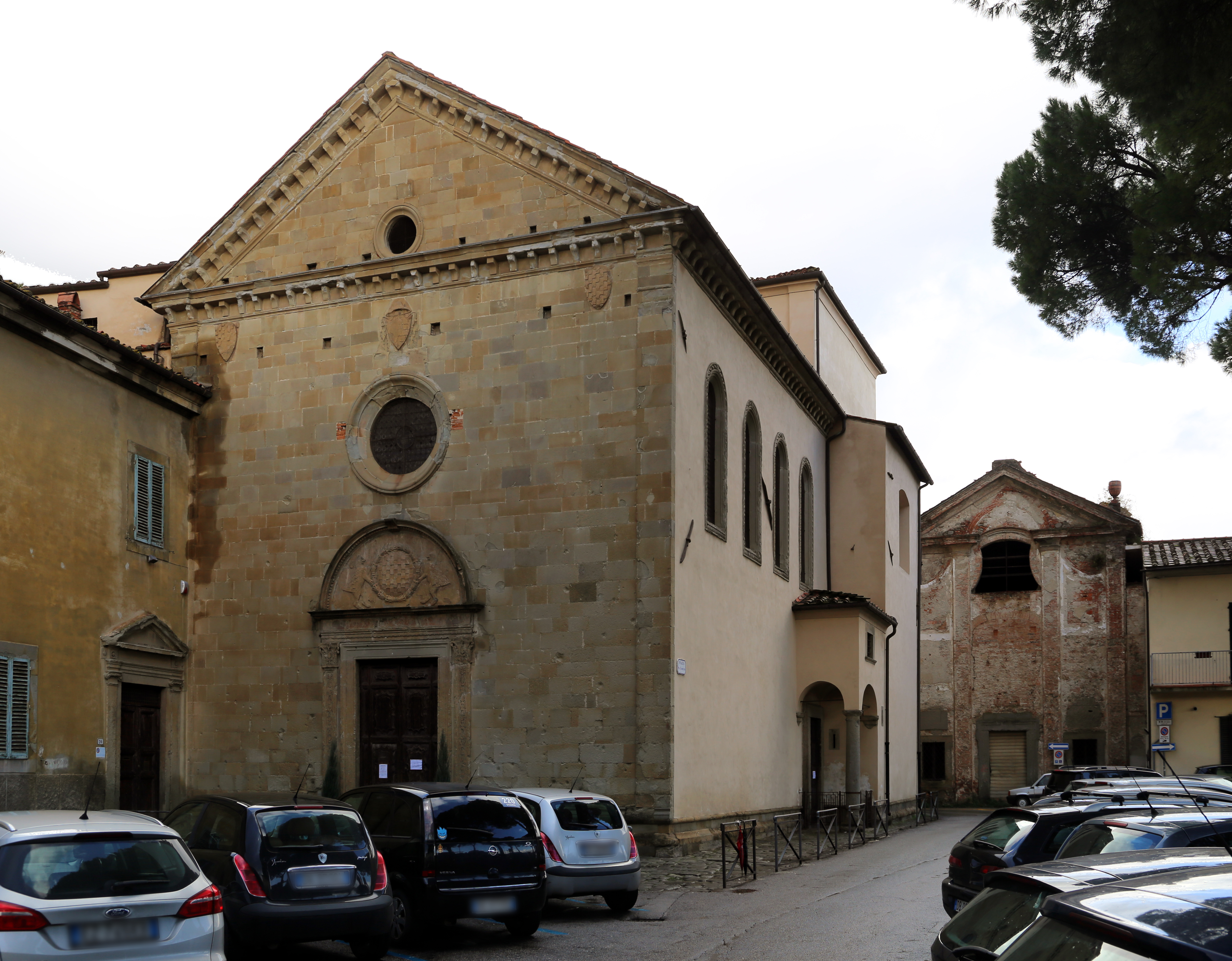
Facade of Santa Maria delle Grazie

Santa Maria delle Grazie, also known as Madonna del Letto (of the cot), is a Renaissance-style, Roman Catholic church located near the city center in Pistoia, region of Tuscany, Italy.

== History ==
According to tradition, in 1336, a young girl convalescing at the then Hospital of San Donnino was cured of her illness by a vision of the Virgin Mary. The room of that hospital became an oratory at this site, and in the 15th-century, this church was erected, conserving the bed (letto) in which the miracle occurred in one of the chapels. The bed is still kept in a chapel of the church. The construction lasted until 1484, with the intervention at the time of completion by Ventura Vittoni. In 1526, an adjacent Augustinian monastery was established, under the supervision of the cathedral and the Operai di San Jacopo. The church was consecrated in 1535. After the suppression in the late 18th century, the church was assigned to what was then the adjacent Hospital del Ceppo. It subsequently became a parish church.

The interior decoration with bands of decorative strips, airy nave with free-standing columns, and apse dome recalls the work of Michelozzo. The stone facade has a large round oculus and a portal flanked by elegant pilasters. The tympanum above the portal contains a bas-relief of two checkered-caped bears (symbols of Pistoia) holding the reiterated checkered coat of arms of Pistoia. An inventory from 1821 recalls the following works:

- Martyrdom of Saint Catherine by Giovanni Battista Naldini for the Rospigliosi altar
- Virgin of the Annunciation by Sebastiano Veronese for the dal Gallo altar
- Virgin of the Assumption by Antonio Circignani dalle Pomarance
- Madonna and Child, a 14th Century fresco painted to recall the miracle, and place on main altar
- Coronation of the Virgin by Benedetto Orsi in one of the lunettes
- Enthroned Madonna and Saints by Lorenzo di Credi
- Massacre of the Innocents by Francesco Marchesini
- Virgin and other Saints by Bastiano Veronese for the Forteguerri altar
- Marble busts of Pietro Forteguerri and his brother, the Cardinal Niccolò Forteguerri by Santi Brunetti
- Virgin of the Assumption by Alessandro Fei for the Altar Sozzifanti

== See also ==
- Late medieval domes
