= Abu al-'Ila Mosque =

Mosque in Cairo, Egypt

Sultan Abu al-'Ila Mosque
- مسجد السلطان أبو العلا
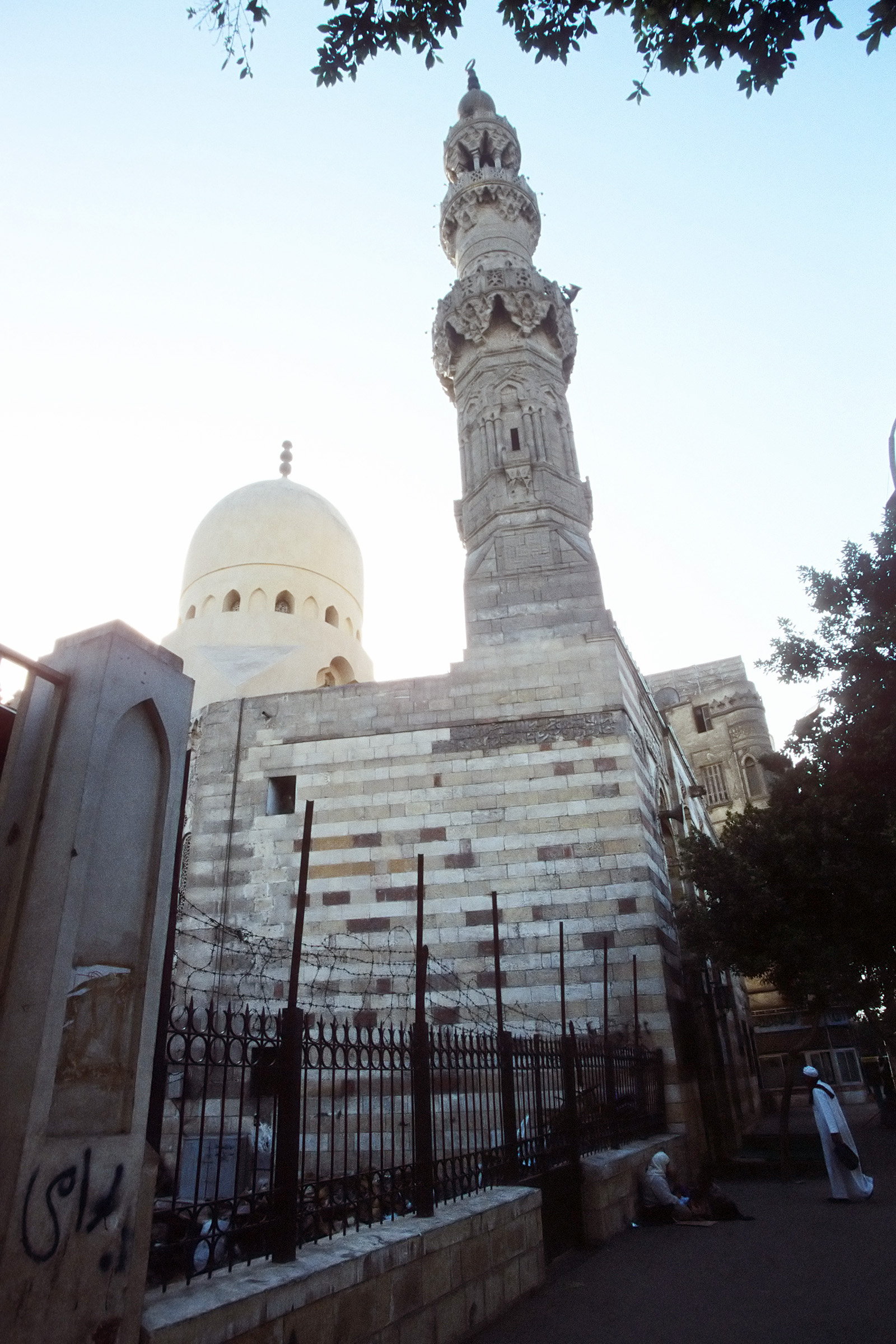

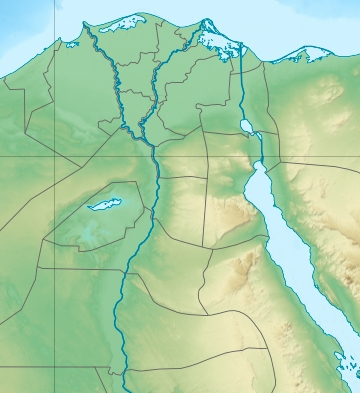
- Location within Northern Egypt

Religion
- Affiliation: Islam
- Branch/tradition: Sunni

Location
- Location: Cairo, Egypt
- Coordinates: 30°02′22″N 31°13′47″E

Architecture
- Type: mosque
- Style: Mamluk

Sultan Abu al-'Ila Mosque (Arabic: مسجد السلطان أبو العلا) is a mosque in the Bulaq neighborhood of Cairo, Egypt.

The mosque is dated to 1485, in the late Mamluk period, and its construction was sponsored by a merchant named Nur al-Din 'Ali ibn Qanish al-Burullusi. It was dedicated to a Sufi saint named Shaykh Husayn Abu 'Ali (from which the name Abu al-'Ila is derived) who died that year and was buried in the attached mausoleum.

The building underwent major modifications between 1915 and 1920. Of the original Mamluk building, only the minaret, the mausoleum, and part of the entrance and east wall still remain. The mosque still holds religious significance for its tomb, which is visited by local Muslims seeking baraka (blessing).

== See also ==
- Islam in Egypt
- Late medieval domes
