= Ballatoio =

Type of balcony

The ballatoio of Santa Maria del Fiore, Florence.

A ballatoio is a type of Italian balcony.
