= Aytmish al-Bajasi =

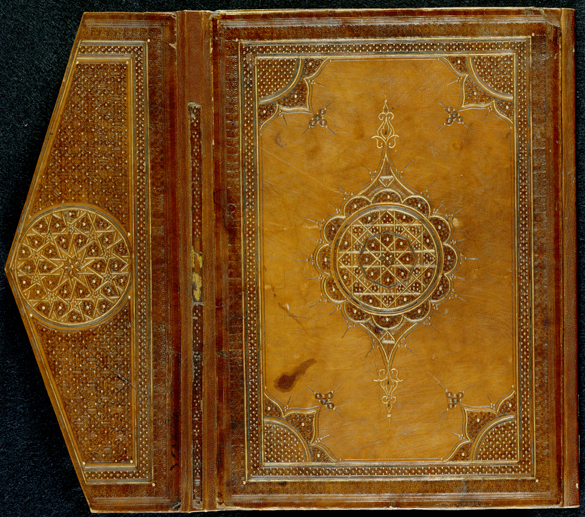
Quran that belonged to Amir Aytmish al-Bajasi.

Aytmish ibn Abd Allah al-Asandamari al-Bajasi al-Zahiri (Arabic: أيتمش بن عبد الله الأسندمري البجاسي الظاهري; better known as Emir Aytmish al-Bajasi), was a Mamluk (enslaved mercenary) of Emir Asandamur al-Bajasi who rose through the ranks and was entrusted with the security of Faraj the son of Mamluk Sultan Barquq.

== Biography ==
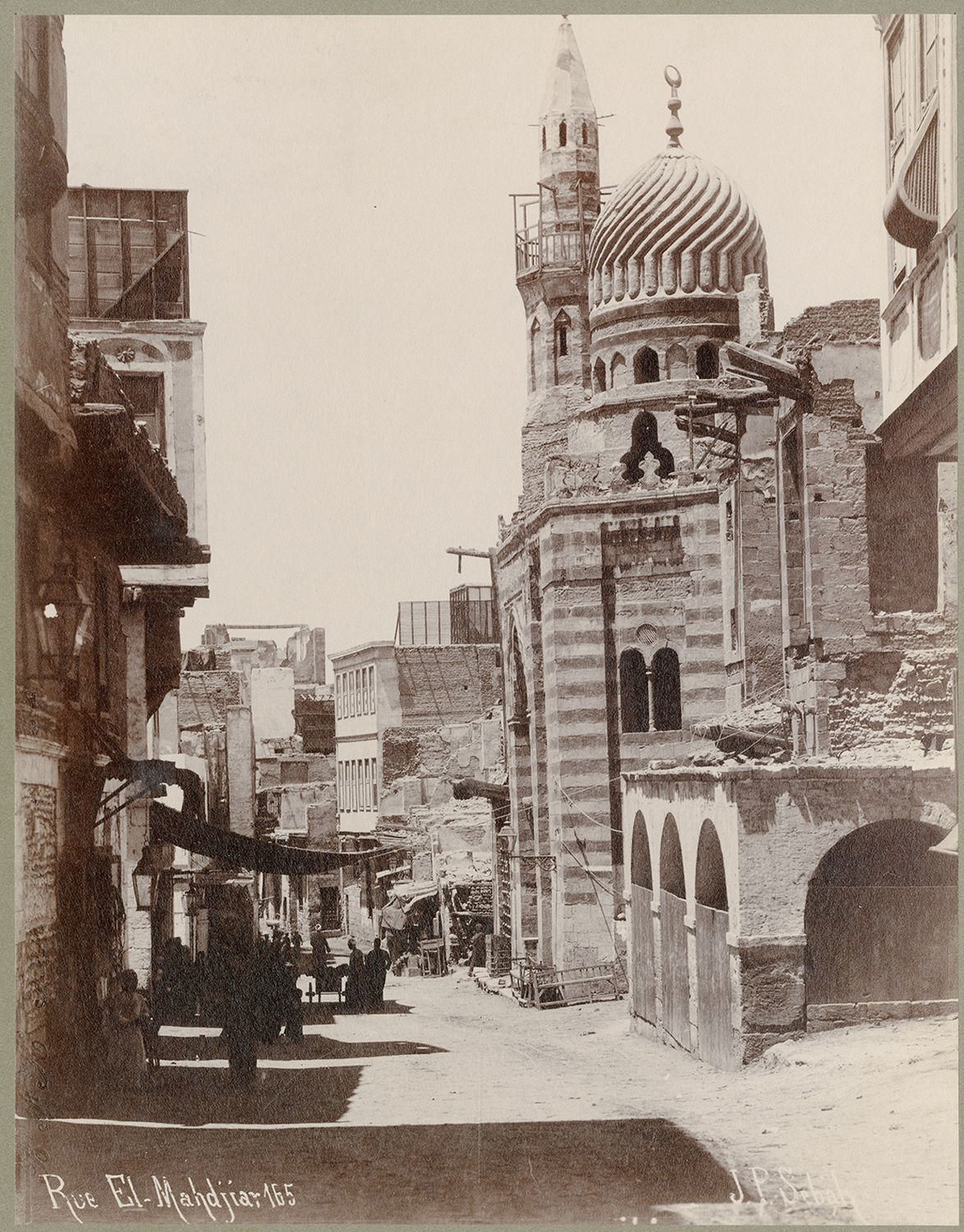
Mosque of Amir Aytmish al-Bajasi c.1890.

Aytmish was born in Cairo during the 14th century AD. (Note: 8th century AH) He worked with the Atabeg Barquq during the reign of Sultan al-Salih Hajji, and he rose through the ranks until he became the supervisor of the royal stables, holding the title of Amir Akhur (Master of the Horse).

When Barquq assumed power in Egypt, he assigned Aytmish the position of Ras Nubah Kabir (Chief of the Guard), then purchased him from the heirs of Emir Jirji, the Naib of Aleppo, and appointed him Atabeg al-Askar (Commander of the Army) in Egypt. When a revolt broke out in Syria against the rule of Sultan Barquq, Aytmish was sent to suppress the rebellion but was captured and imprisoned in the Citadel of Damascus. After Barquq regained the sultanate in 1390, he released Aytmish from prison and appointed him as guardian to his son An-Nasir Faraj. Another revolt arose against Faraj ibn Barquq and Aytmish, the latter fled from Egypt to Syria, where he was imprisoned in the Citadel of Damascus and executed in his cell on April 19, 1400, CE. (Note: 14 Sha'ban 802 AH)

== Legacy ==
A number of Mamluk-era structures are associated with his name, among which are the Tower of Emir Aytmish in Tripoli, Lebanon (destroyed), and the Mosque and Madrasa of Aytmish al-Bajasi on Bab al-Wazir Street in Cairo.
