= Al-Khalifa District =

District in southern Cairo, Egypt

Al-Khalifa الخليفة
- District
- Al-Khalifa District
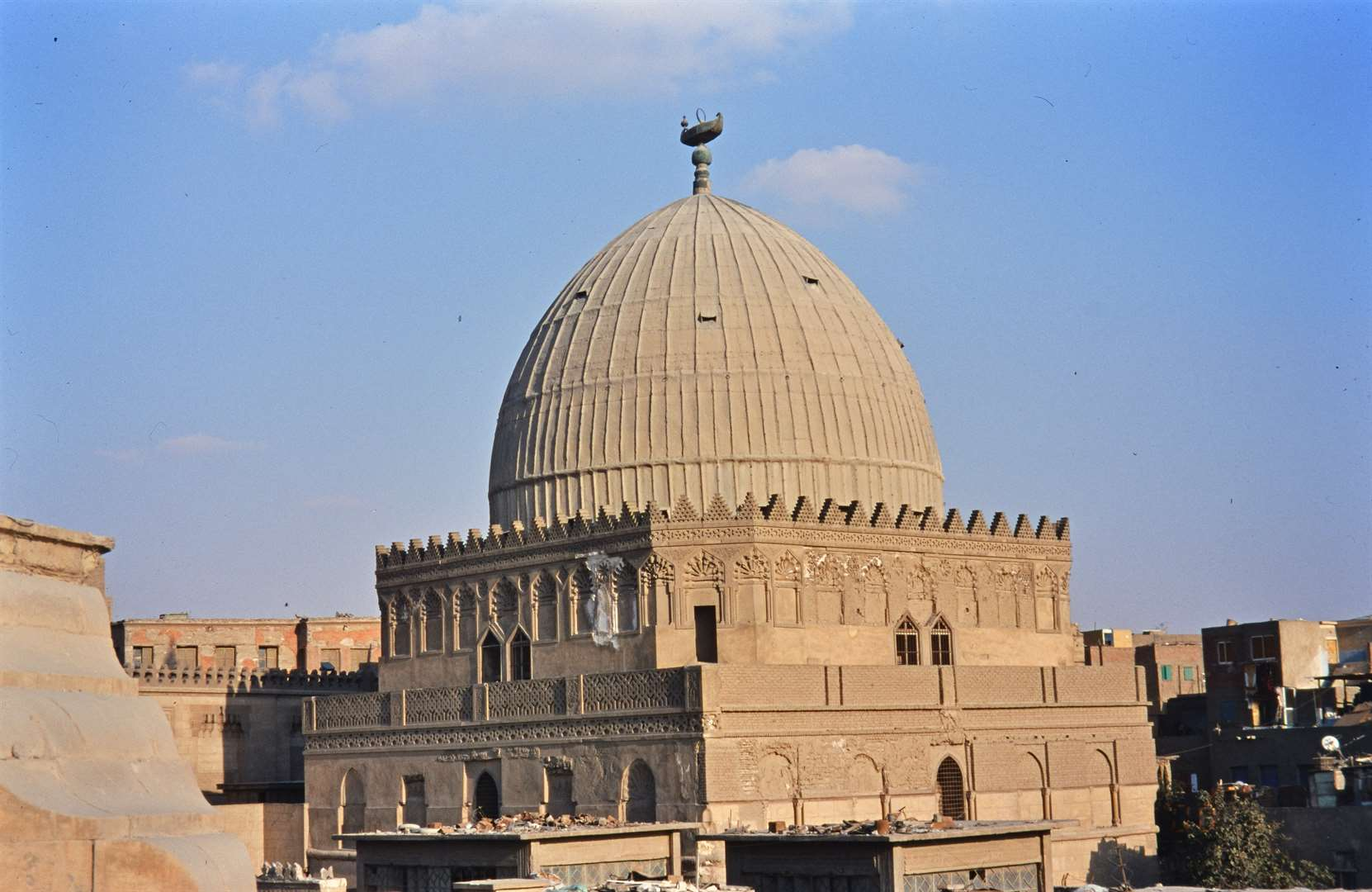
- Mausoleum of Imam al-Shafi'i

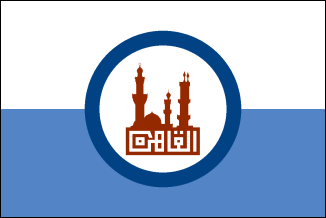
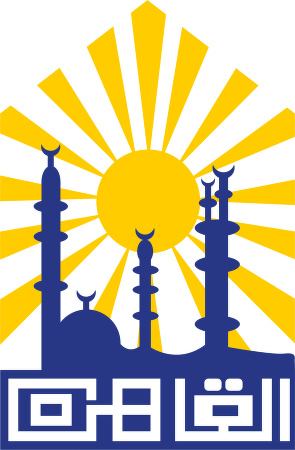
- Flag Seal
- Interactive map of Al-Khalifa
- Coordinates: 30°01′00″N 31°15′16″E
- Country: Egypt

Area
  - Total: 12.79 ha (31.6 acres)

Population
  - Total: 112,568
- Time zone: GMT+3
- Website: khalifa.atharlina.com/ar/about-us

Al-Khalifa (Arabic: الخليفة, romanized: al-Khalīfa) is one of the districts of the southern region of Cairo Governorate, Egypt. It is known for its historical and religious monuments, as it encompasses the southern portion of Historic Cairo and of the Qarafa cemetery (City of the Dead).

== Name ==
The district is named after the Fatimid caliph Al-Mu'izz li-Din Allah, who founded Cairo.

== Infrastructure ==
Al-Khalifa district includes several service institutions, including Al-Khalifa police station, the civil registry building for the district, Al-Khalifa General Hospital, and several sports centers for the neighborhood's youth, including the Mubarak Youth Center in Al-Amin and Al-Tunisi.

== Geography ==
Located in the middle of Cairo, Al-Khalifa is the link between residents of the Basateen, Maadi, and Sayeda Zeinab neighborhoods and downtown Cairo. The most important streets are Al-Alfy Street and Shaikhon Street.

=== Divisions ===
Al-Khalifa neighborhood consists of fourteen chiefdoms, which are:

- Abagiya
- Imamin
- Al-Baqali
- Al-Tunisi
- Al-Hattaba
- Helmiya
- Khalifa
- Sayda Aisha
- Saliba
- Al-Qadiriya
- Mahgar
- Darb Ghaziya
- Darb al-Hasar
- Arab al-Yasar

=== Areas ===
Al-Tunisi is considered an important area of Al-Khalifa district, bordered on the east by the Autostrad Cemetery area and Mokattam Hill, on the west by the Imam Al-Shafi'i Cemetery and Imam Al-Shafi'i area, on the south by the Basateen Cemetery and Basateen neighborhood, and on the north by the area and cemeteries of Sayeda Aisha.

== Landmarks ==
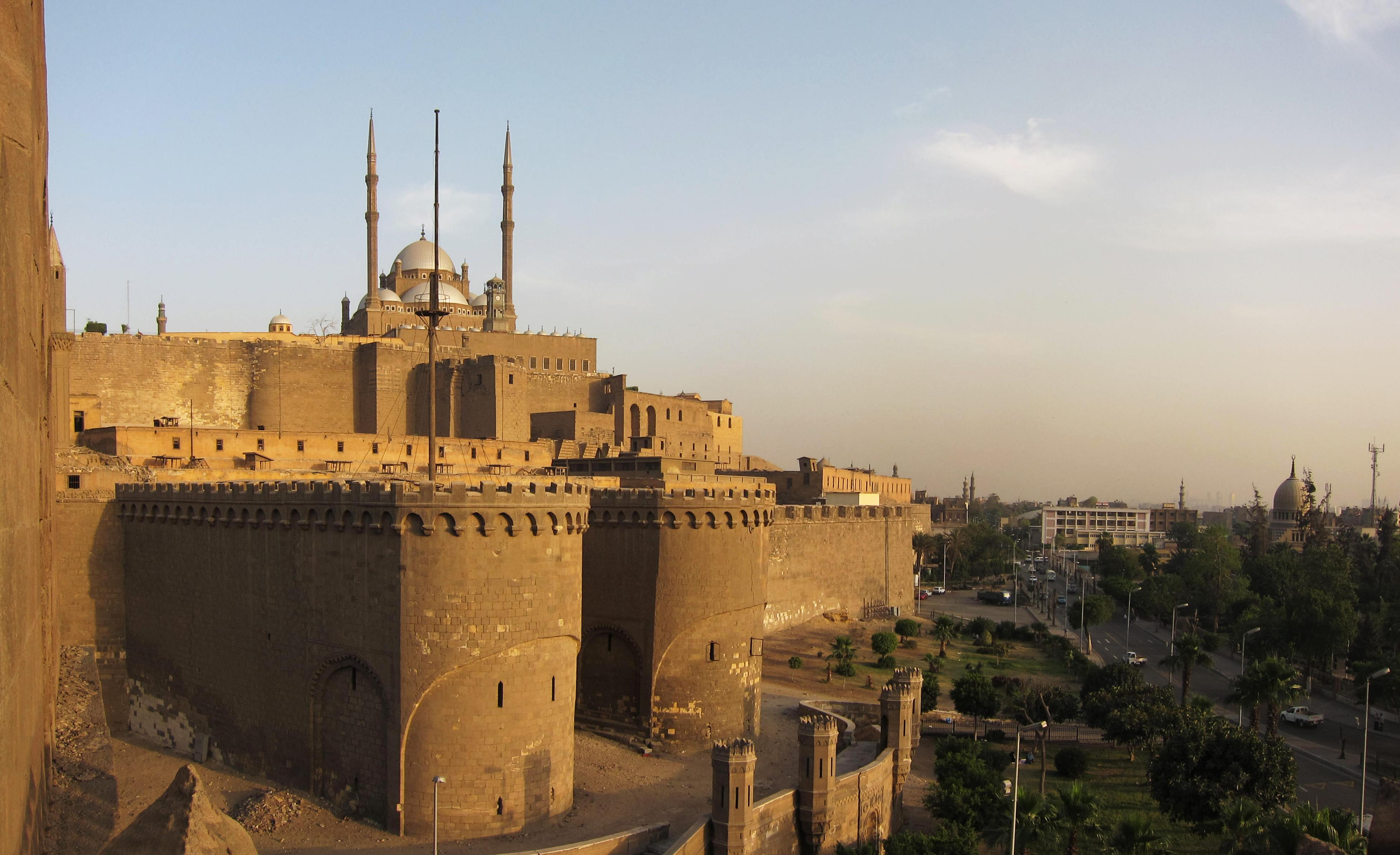
View of the Cairo Citadel, topped by the Mosque of Muhammad Ali

The area contains many historical mosques and monuments, as it overlaps with Historic Cairo and the large historic Qarafa cemetery. The Cairo Citadel or Citadel of Saladin overlooks the district and the city from the nearby Mokattam Hills. Begun by Saladin (Salah ad-Din) in 1176, it was the seat of government of Egypt from Saladin's time until the beginning of the rule of the Muhammad Ali dynasty. It contains additional monuments and cultural attractions such as the Muhammad Ali Mosque, al-Nasir Muhammad Mosque, and the Egyptian National Military Museum.

Outside the Citadel, important concentrations of monuments are found in many areas. Around Salah al-Din Square (at the foot of the Citadel), is the Mosque-Madrasa of Sultan Hasan and the Al-Rifa'i Mosque, along with other Mamluk-era and Ottoman-era mosques. Along Saliba Street (west of Salah ad-Din Square) is the 9th-century Ibn Tulun Mosque, one of the oldest mosques in the city, as well as various other landmarks from later periods, including the Mosque and Khanqah of Shaykhu, the Sabil of Umm Abbas, the Madrasa of Sarghatmish, and the Salar and Sangar al-Gawli Mausoleum.

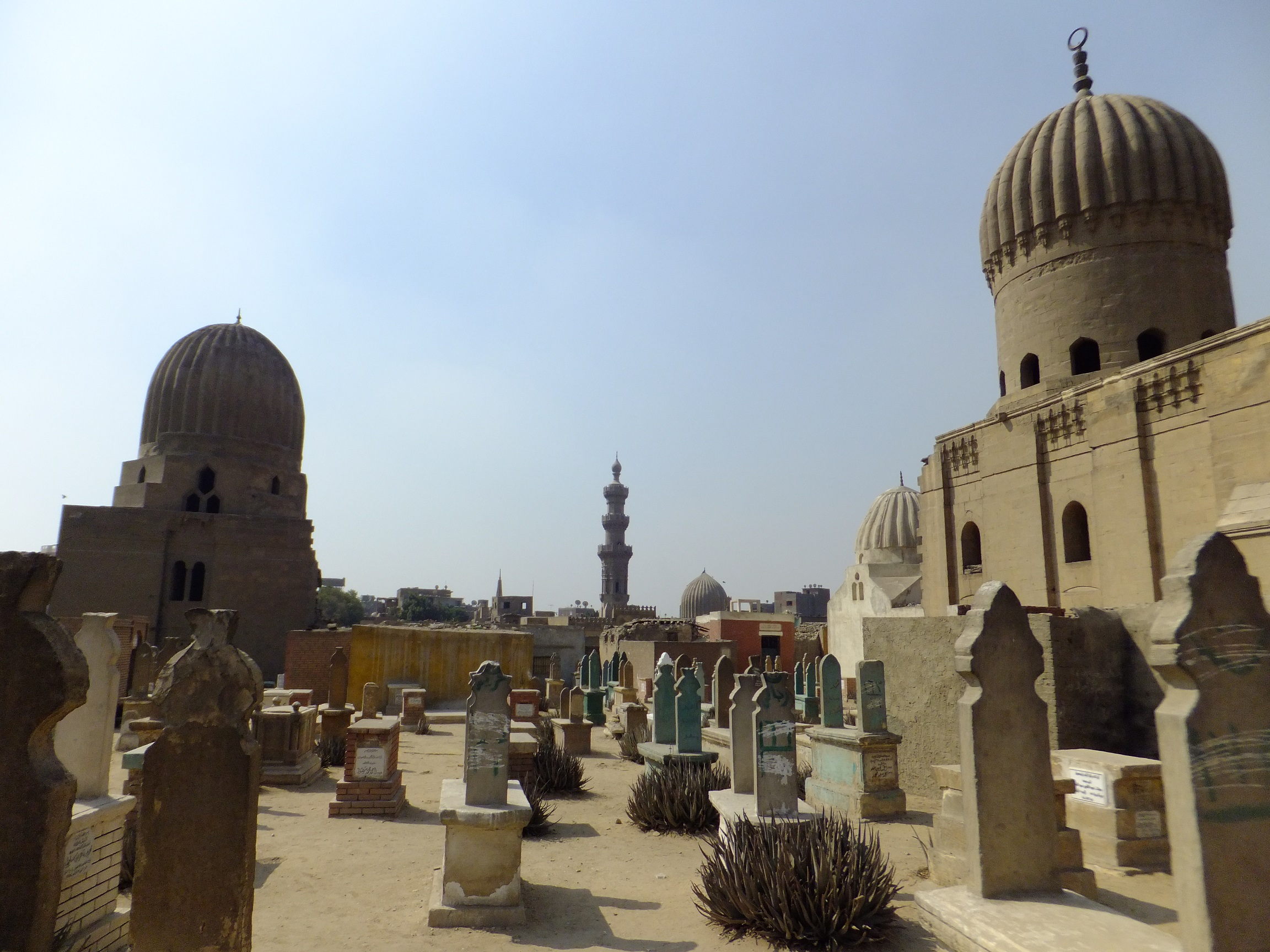
The Mamluk-era Sultaniyya Mausoleum (right) and Mausoleum of Amir Qawsun (left), surrounded by other graves, in Cairo's southern Qarafa cemetery

Along al-Khalifa Street (south of Saliba), are several important mosques and shrines dedicated to members of the Ahl al-Bayt (the family and descendants of Muhammad), including the Sayyida Nafisa Mosque, the Sayyida Aisha Mosque, the Mashhad of Sayyida Ruqayya, the Mausoleum of Shajar al-Durr, and the Mosque of Sayyida Sukayna. Further south, across a major road, stretches the Southern Cemetery (Qarafa) of Cairo. The northern edge of this cemetery, near the Citadel, contains several Mamluk and Ottoman-era monuments such as the Sultaniyya Mausoleum and the Mausoleum of Amir Qawsun. To the south is the Imam al-Shafi'i neighbourhood, an important area that includes the Mausoleum of Imam al-Shafi'i, the Hosh al-Basha, and other historic tombs.
