= Sultaniyya Mausoleum =

Funerary complex in Cairo, Egypt

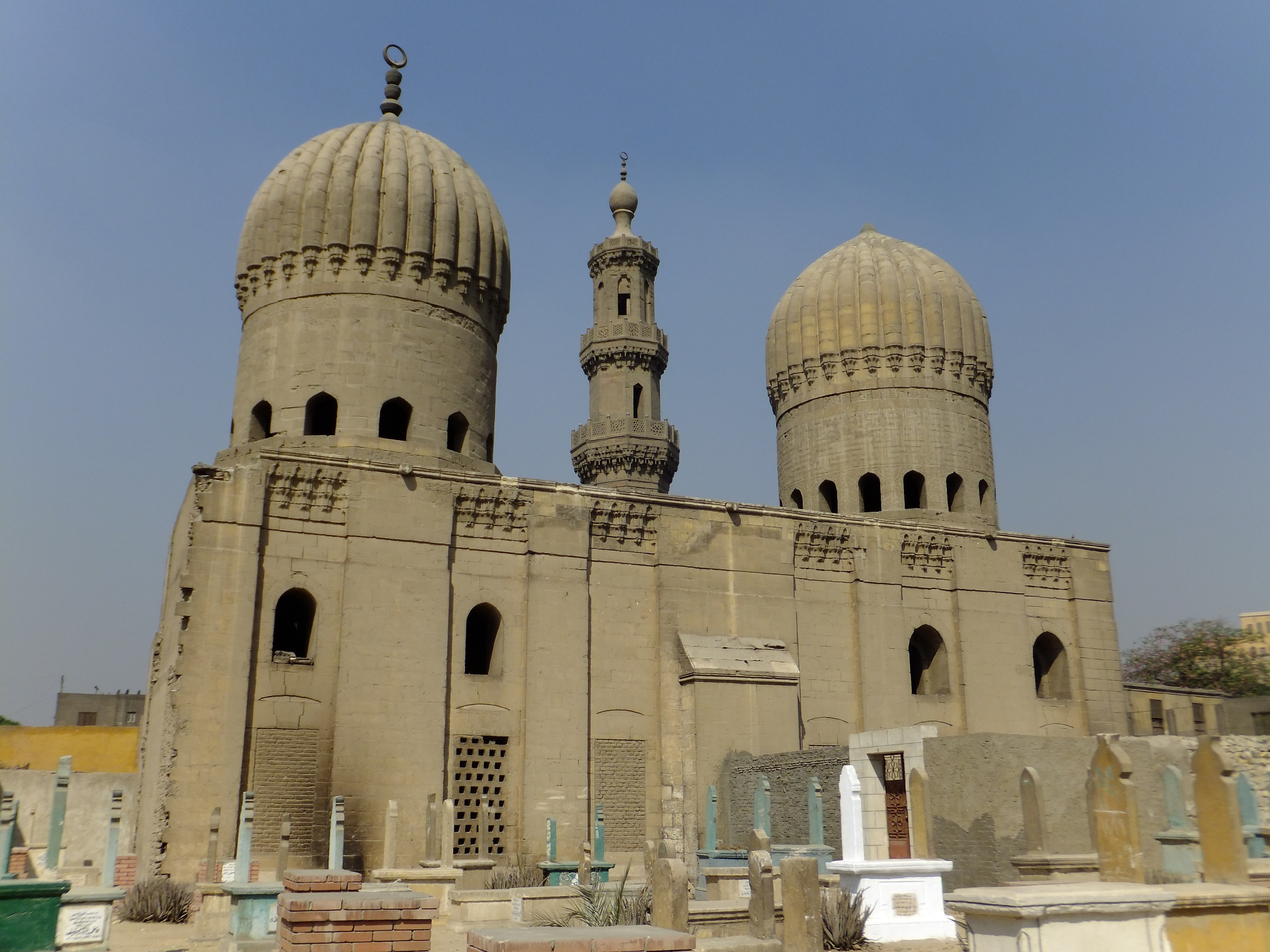
- Southeastern side of the building, with the minaret partly visible behind (2012 photo)

- Location within Egypt

Religion
- Affiliation: Islam
- Region: Africa
- Patron: Sultan Hasan

Location
- Location: Southern Cemetery, Islamic Cairo, Cairo, Egypt
- Coordinates: 30°01′26″N 31°15′34″E

Architecture
- Type: Mausoleum, Khanqah
- Style: Mamluk, Islamic
- Completed: 1350s (exact year unknown)

Specifications
- Dome: 2
- Minaret: 1
- Materials: stone

The Sultaniyya Mausoleum is a Mamluk-era funerary complex located in the Southern Cemetery of the Qarafa (or City of the Dead), the necropolis of Cairo, Egypt. It is believed to have been built in the 1350s and dedicated to the mother of Sultan Hasan. It is notable for its unique pair of stone domes.

== Historical background ==
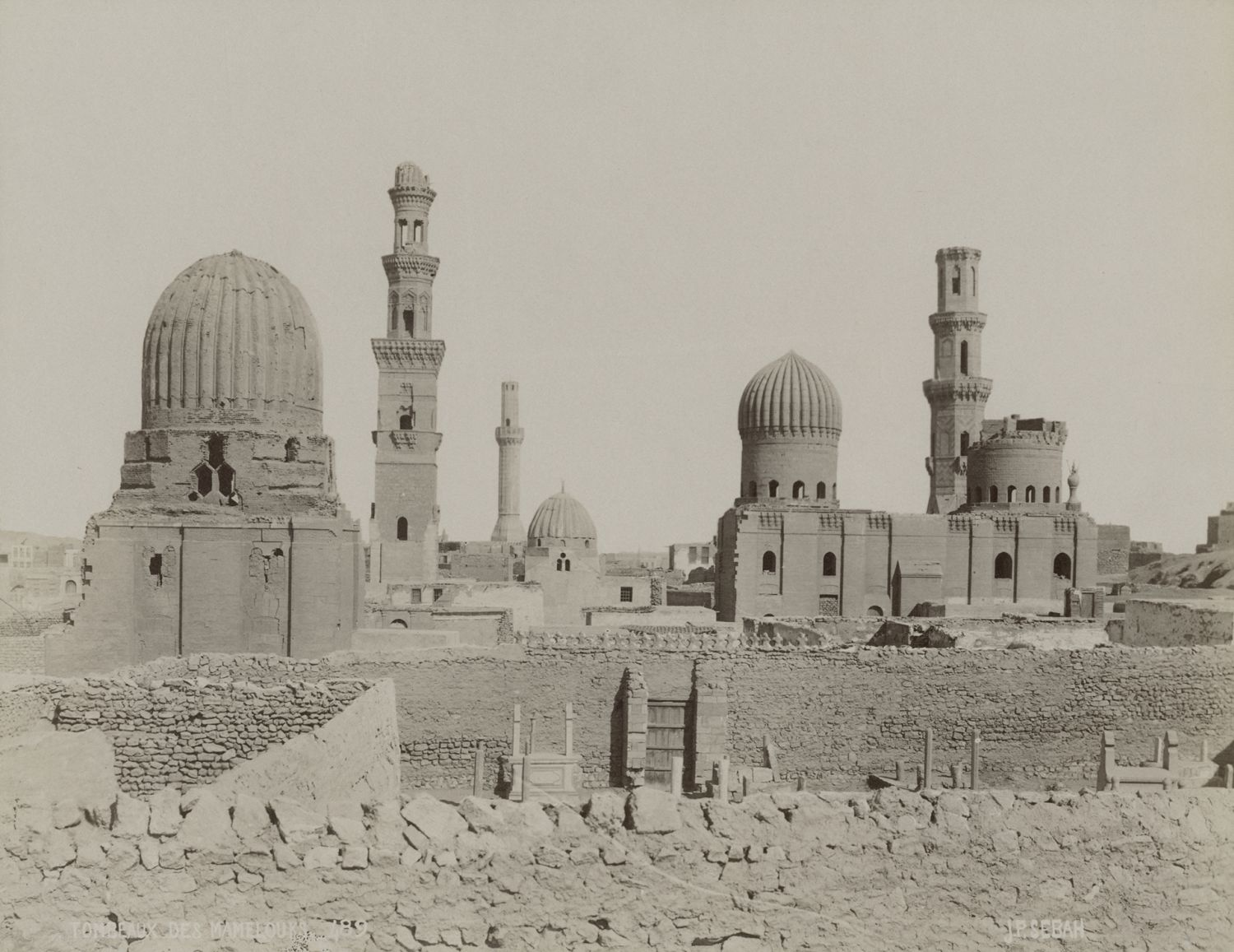
View of the Sultaniyya Mausoleum (right) circa 1900. The northern dome and the top of the minaret have partially collapsed. (On the left is the mausoleum and minaret of Amir Qawsun.)

Sultan an-Nasir Hasan's mother died when he was still a child, and he was instead raised by a stepmother (named by Maqrizi as either Ardu or Tughay). Little is known about the mausoleum or Sultan Hasan's mother, as no original waqf documents for this building have survived. The building was instead identified indirectly with the help of the waqf document of the nearby Mosque of Nur al-Din, built by the Ottoman governor Masih Pasha in 1575, which mentions a mausoleum belonging to Sultan Hasan's mother standing next to it. Additionally, the bold architectural forms of the structure and the fact that the domes are made of stone (rather than brick or wood), suggests that the building was issued from royal patronage. Based on this information, it is believed to have been built by Sultan Hasan during his reign around the 1350s. The name sultaniyya means "sultanic" or "royal", and may have been a popular name given to the structure.

The cemetery in which the mausoleum is located was originally a cemetery founded by the Bahri Mamluks in 1290, on land near the Citadel that was formerly used for military training exercises (next to this was also a Mamluk hippodrome which existed for centuries). The mausoleum and khanqah of Amir Qawsun, which was built in 1335, also stands very close by and possessed a similar layout as the Sultaniyya.

A part of the Sultaniyya complex, including its courtyard, has disappeared, and its current remains were restored in modern times. In 2023, the minaret of the complex was disassembled in order to make way for a new highway roundabout, amidst other demolitions in the area. The Egyptian government plans to move the minaret to another location.

== Architecture ==
The complex consists of two domed chambers, a prayer space between them, and a minaret that currently stands apart but was probably once attached to a wall that formed a courtyard or enclosure for the complex . The whole complex was likely originally intended to be used as a khanqah (Sufi lodge) in addition to the mausoleums, much like the funerary complex of Qawsun nearby.

=== Central iwan ===
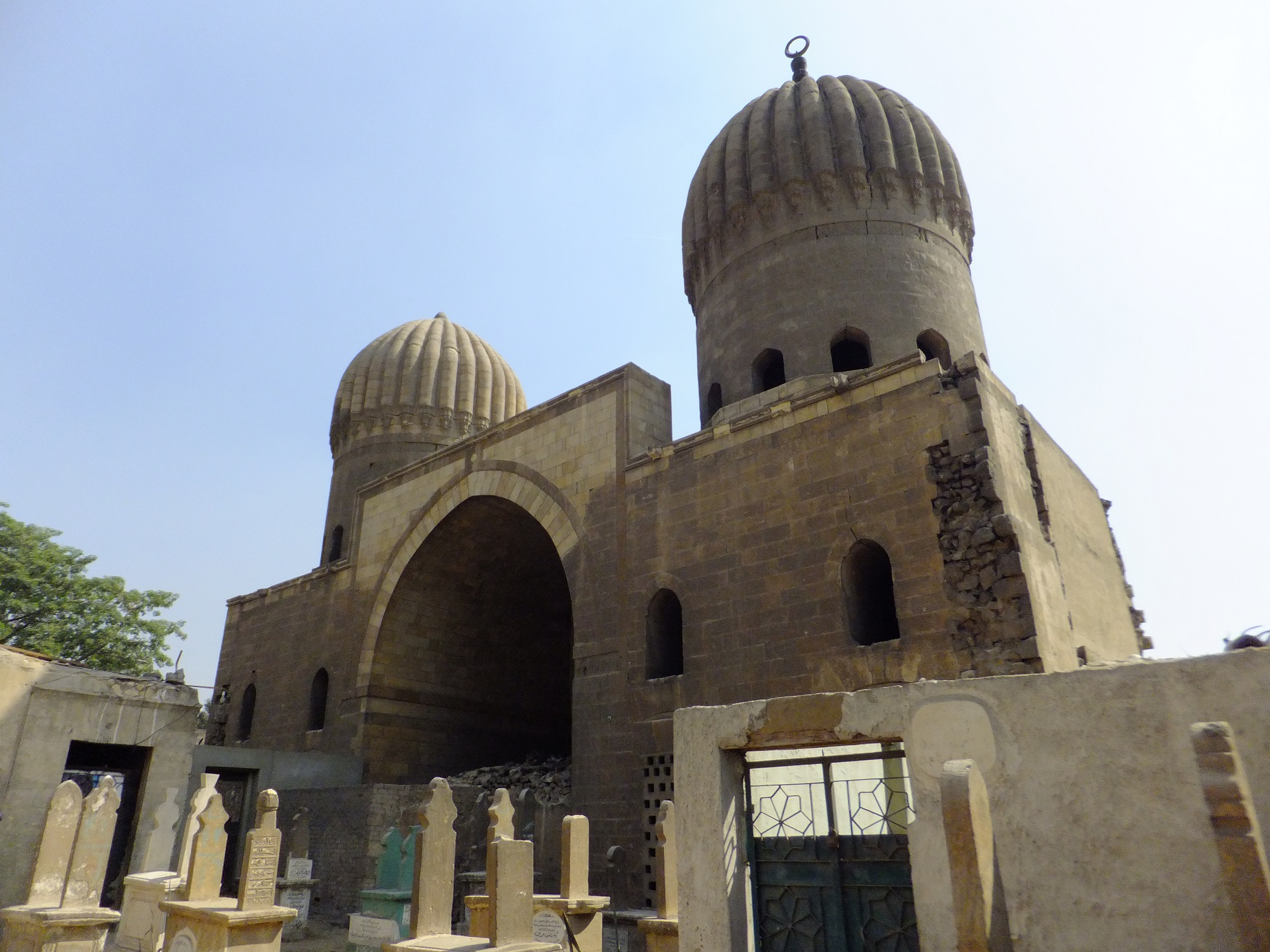
Northwest side of the main structure, with the central iwan visible

Between the two domes and tomb chambers is a large iwan (vaulted hall open to one side), with an inscription running along its walls. This iwan has a stone mihrab (niche symbolizing the direction of prayer) whose upper section is carved with muqarnas in a style similar to the lateral niches in the entrance portal of the Madrasa-Mosque of Sultan Hasan, possibly of Anatolian (Turkish) inspiration. This iwan was probably used for prayers and most likely faced a large courtyard which was adjoined to the mausoleum structure.

=== Mausoleums and domes ===
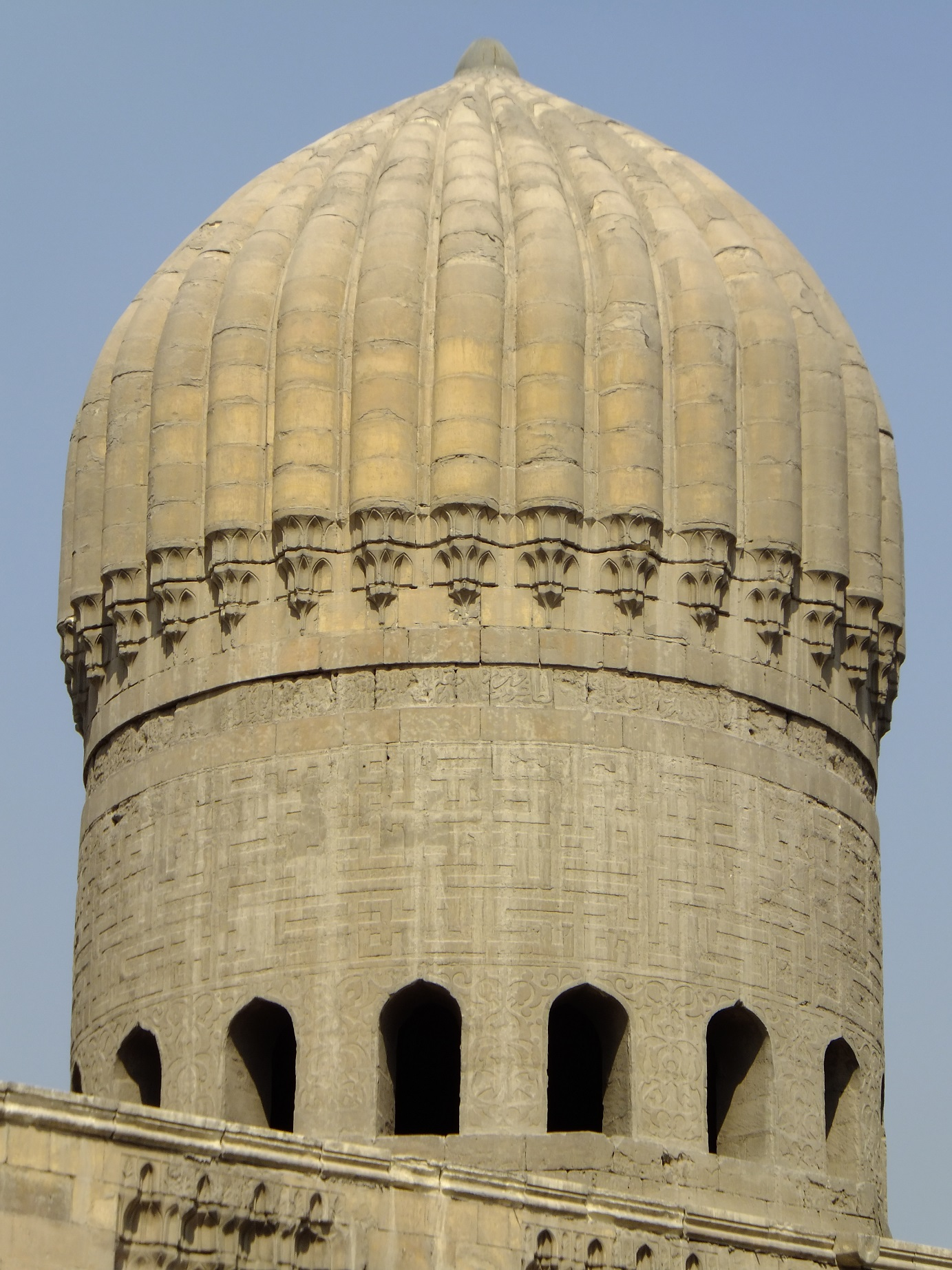
The northern dome. The drum (cylindrical section below) is carved with Square Kufic Arabic script.

The structure's most distinctive feature is its two stone domes. The domes are ribbed or fluted on the outside, have a pointed "bulbous" profile, and stand on high drums. The stone "ribs" end in a slim cornice of muqarnas above the edge of the drums. This form is very reminiscent of Timurid architecture in Samarkand (e.g. the Gur-e-Amir) but predates the latter by half a century, most likely indicating that it originated here first in Cairo or that it was influenced by earlier Iranian domed structures which have since disappeared. Similar dome shapes appear at the Madrasa of Sarghitmish (also in Cairo), which was built around the same time, and possibly at the slightly earlier Khanqah of Amir Shaykhu. The original dome of Sultan Hasan's own massive mausoleum, also built during his reign, was described as having a similar shape as well (though it no longer exists today as it was replaced with a different type of dome). However, none of these other contemporary domes had the same ribbed form with muqarnas and none of them were built in stone, making the Sultaniyya's domes unique.

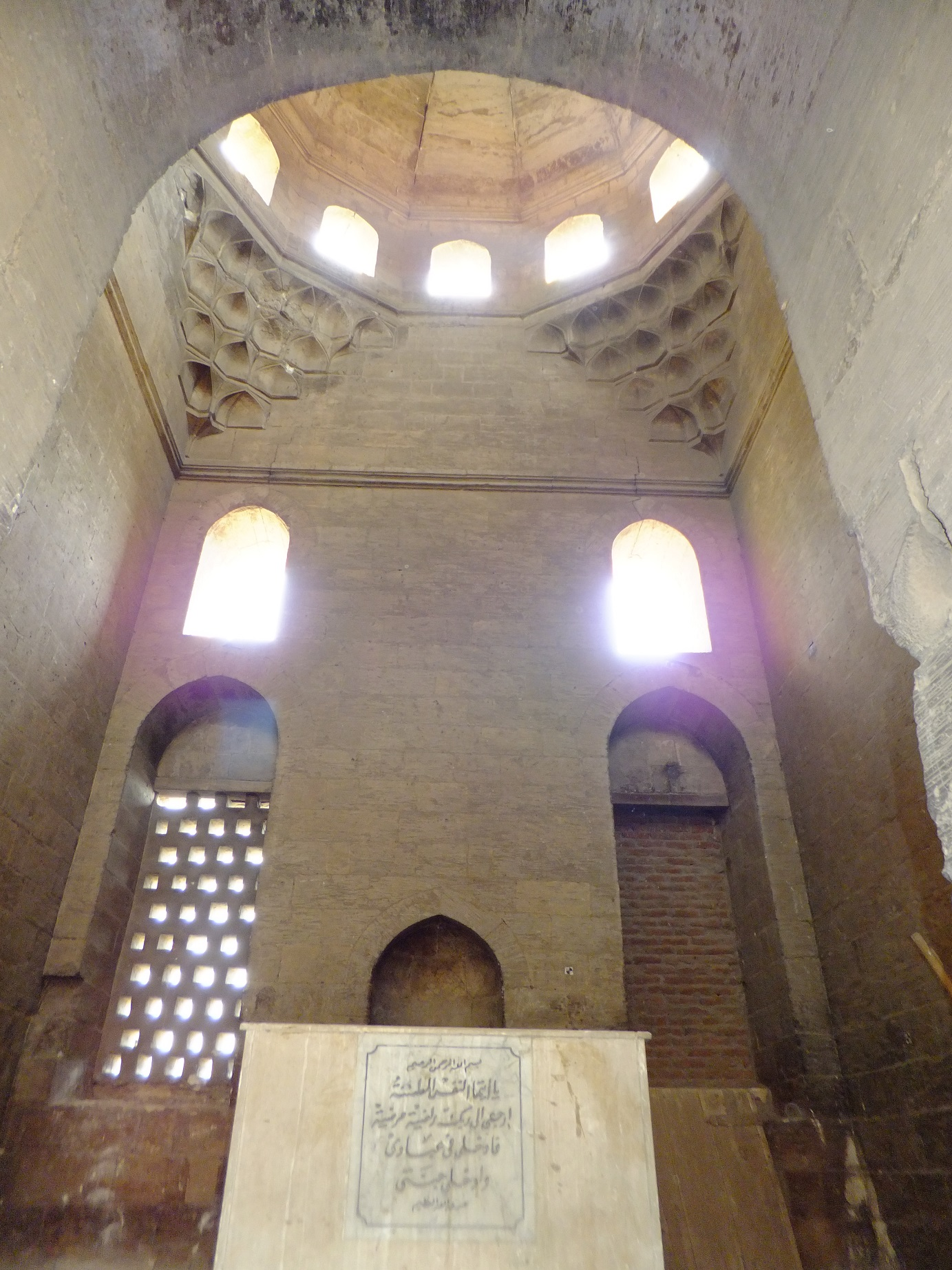
Inside one of the tomb chambers

The two domes are very similar to each other but not quite identical. The drum of the northern dome is covered in square Kufic Arabic letters carved over the stone surface. It's possible that this was meant to appear on the drum of the other dome too but that it was left unfinished. Both domes have an Arabic inscription running around the top edge of their drums. The two domes are also "double" domes, which is to say that they have an outer shell (visible from the exterior) and an inner shell which covers the mausoleum chamber under them.

Inside the mausoleum chambers, the transition between the round domes and the square chamber is achieved through the use of pendentives carved in muqarnas forms. Each mausoleum chamber has its own simple stone mihrab.

=== Minaret ===
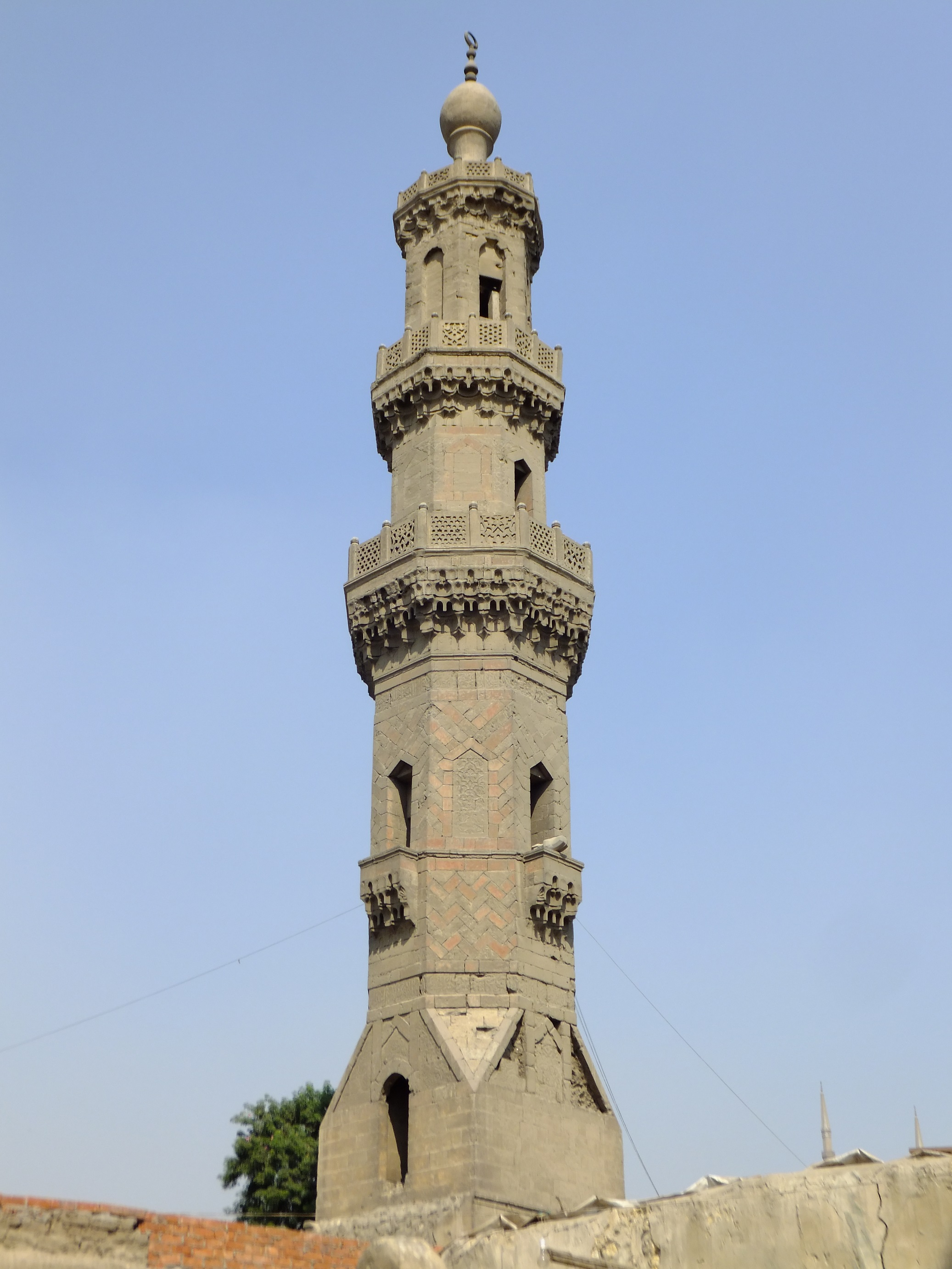
The minaret of the complex (2012 photo)

Nearby, presumably at the opposing end of the vanished courtyard, rises the mausoleum's minaret, which now appears to stand alone but originally would have been connected to the mausoleum by the outer walls of the complex. The minaret, with an octagonal shaft, is similar to the minarets of the Madrasa-Mosque of Sultan Hasan, but its surfaces are also covered with arabesque stone carvings, in addition to the usual muqarnas carvings under the balconies.

== See also ==
- Late medieval domes
