= Mosque of Sayyida Sukayna =

Mosque in Cairo, Egypt

Mosque of Aslam al-Silahdar
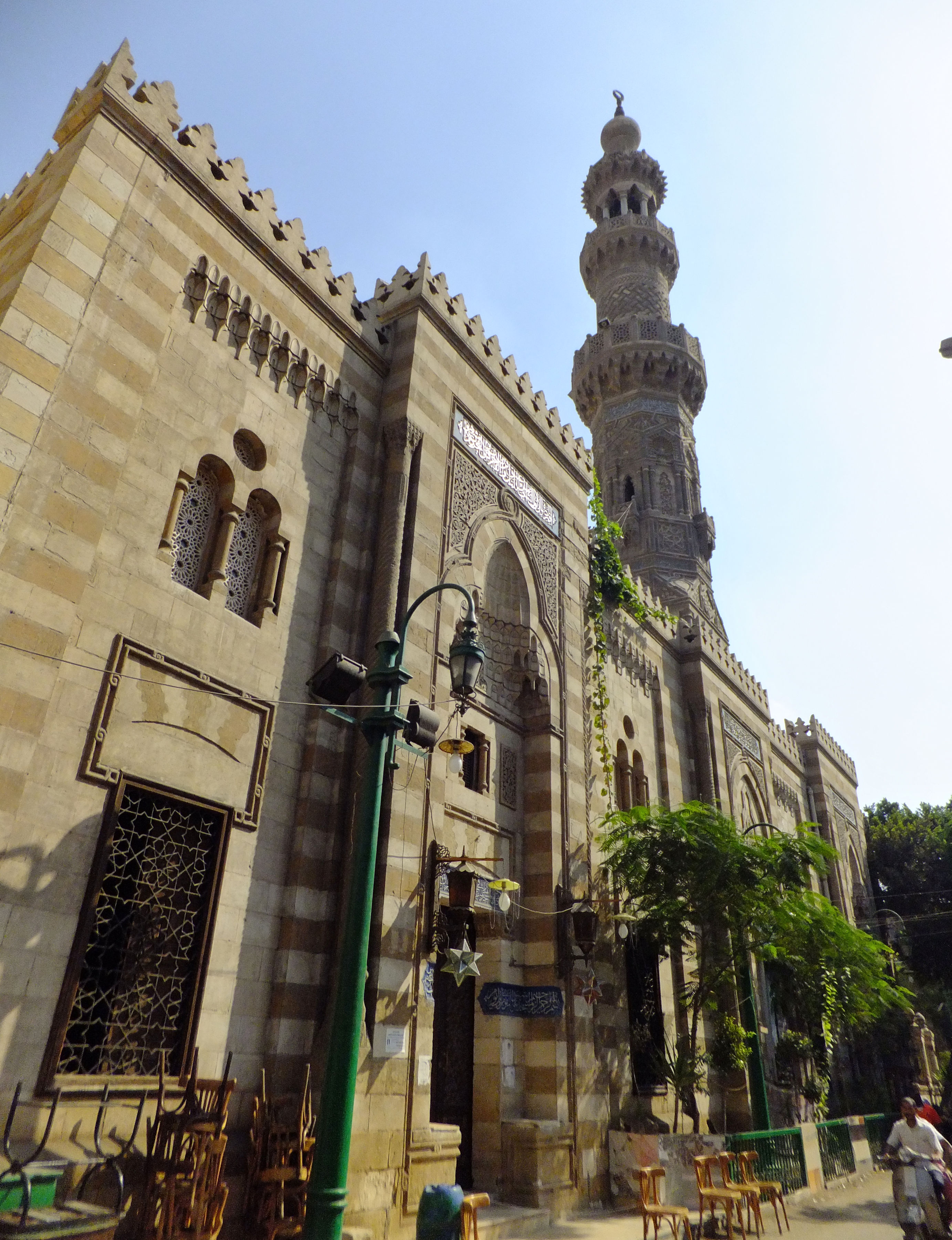
- View of the mosque from al-Khalifa street

Religion
- Affiliation: Islam

Location
- Location: al-Khalifa, Cairo, Egypt
- Interactive map of Mosque of Aslam al-Silahdar
- Coordinates: 30°1′37″N 31°15′7.5″E

Architecture
- Type: Mosque, mausoleum
- Style: Neo-Mamluk
- Completed: 1904 (current structure)

Specifications
- Dome: 1
- Minaret: 1

The Mosque of Sayyida Sukayna or Mosque of Sayyida Sakina is a historic mosque in Cairo, Egypt. According to an apocryphal tradition, it contains the tomb of Sakina, a daughter of Husayn. The current building dates from 1904. It is located in the historic al-Khalifa neighbourhood, on the outskirts of Cairo's Southern Cemetery.

== History ==
=== Origins ===
The mosque is named after to Amna bint al-Hussein ibn Ali, a descendant of Muhammad. She was born in the 7th century and her mother was Rubab bint Imra al-Qais, a daughter of the chief of the Banu Kalb tribe. Rubab nicknamed her Sakina or Sukayna (Arabic: سكينة, lit. 'tranquility, peace'). Historians have differed on whether her tomb in Cairo is in fact her true resting place. Those who acknowledge it rely on the following story: she was betrothed to Al-Asbagh ibn Abdul Aziz and sent to Egypt by the Umayyad caliph Abd al-Malik ibn Marwan, but she found out that he had cheated, so she went back.

=== Construction history ===
A mosque was built over the site of the tomb in 1760 through the patronage of Abd al-Rahman Katkhuda, a mamluk official. It was replaced by a new mosque built in 1904 by Khedive Abbas II in a neo-Mamluk style.
