= Mausoleum of Amir Qawsun =

Funerary complex in Cairo, Egypt

Khanqah–Mausoleum of Amir Qawsun
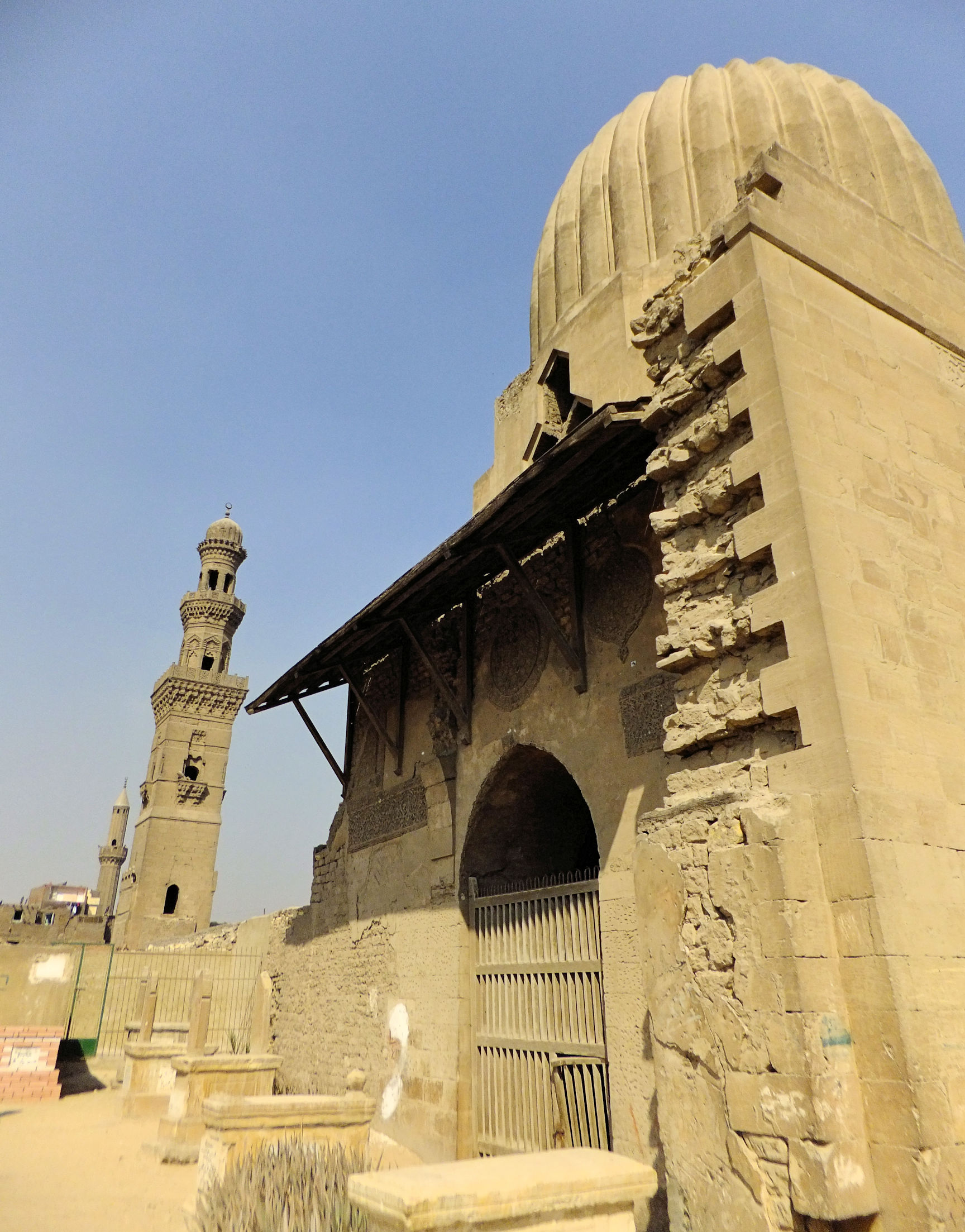
- Mausoleum chamber (right) and minaret (left) of the complex (Note: All photos in this article are from 2012 (prior to recent construction and demolition in the area) unless otherwise indicated.)

- Location within Egypt

Religion
- Affiliation: Islam
- Patron: Qawsun

Location
- Location: Southern Cemetery, Cairo, Egypt
- Coordinates: 30°01′24.8″N 31°15′33.9″E

Architecture
- Type: Mausoleum, Khanqah
- Style: Mamluk
- Completed: c. 1335

Specifications
- Dome: 1 (formerly 2)
- Minaret: 1
- Materials: stone, stucco

The Mausoleum of Amir Qawsun or Khanqah–Mausoleum of Amir Qawsun is a historic architectural complex in the Southern Cemetery of Cairo, Egypt. It was built in the 1330s to house the tomb of its patron, the Mamluk commander Qawsun.

== History ==
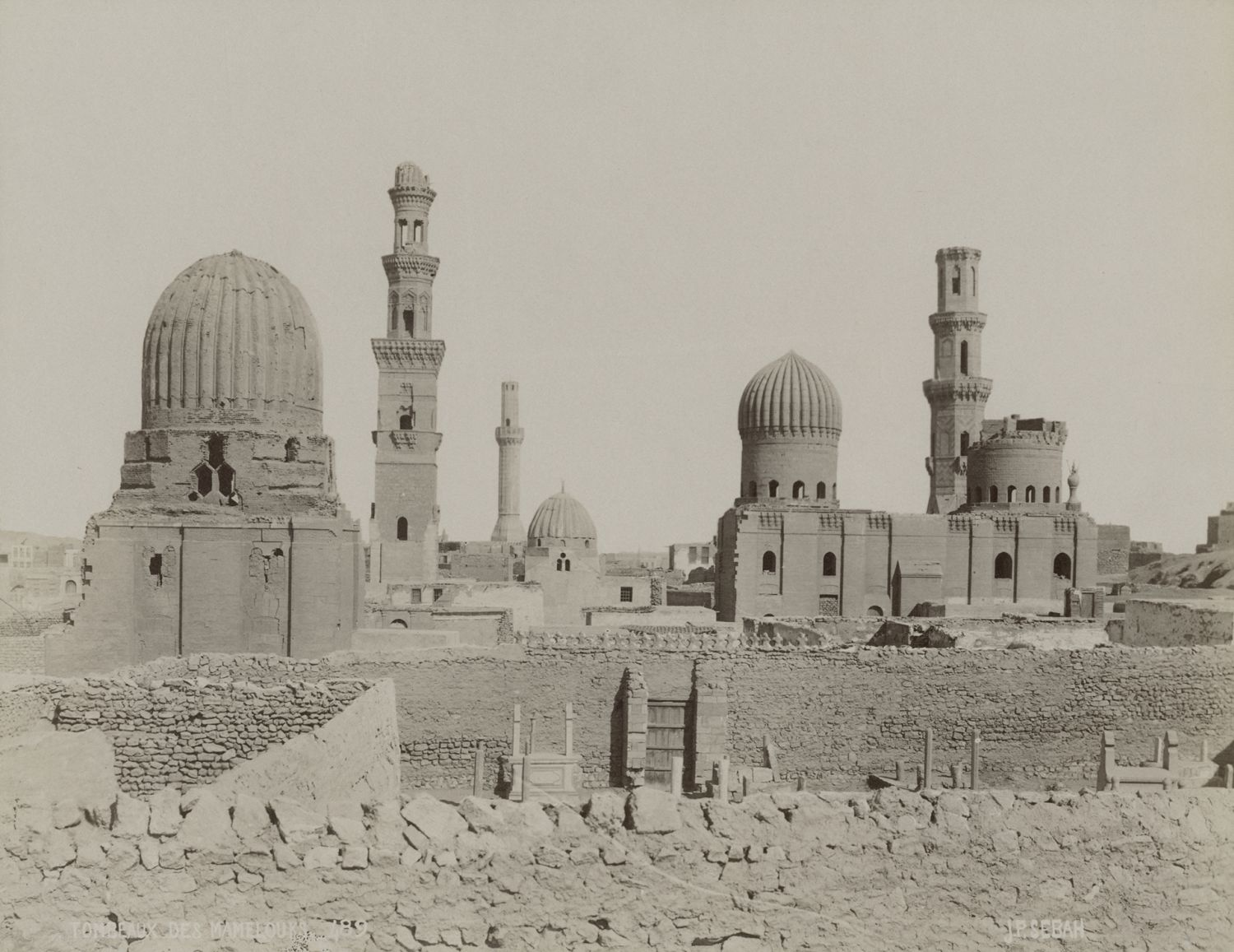
View of Qawsun's ruined complex (left) circa 1900, with the nearby Sultaniyya Mausoleum (right)

The construction of the funerary complex is dated to 1335 CE (736 AH). Its accompanying minaret is dated to 1337. Its patron, Qawsun, was a powerful amir (commander) in the Mamluk Sultanate during the reign of al-Nasir Muhammad. After the latter's death in 1341, he briefly remained influential until he was arrested and executed in Alexandria later that same year. His body was brought back to Cairo and buried in the mausoleum he commissioned.

The mausoleum complex is partially ruined today. Along with some of the other medieval monuments in the vicinity, some of its walls were likely quarried for construction materials in later periods, contributing to its current state. Its remaining parts were restored in the 1980s by the Supreme Council of Antiquities.

In 2023, the minaret, along with the minaret of the nearby Sultaniyya Mausoleum, was dismantled to make way for a new highway roundabout. The Egyptian government has stated that it will move both minarets to a new location.

== Architecture ==
The original complex was a combination of khanqah (a venue for Sufis) and mausoleum. It consisted of two domed tomb chambers attached to either side of a prayer hall that served the khanqah. The minaret was attached to the northwest corner of the complex. This is similar in composition to the nearby Sultaniyya Mausoleum, built later in the same century, and reflected a common layout used in Cairo during this period. The whole complex was about as large as the better-preserved Khanqah of Faraj ibn Barquq (15th century) in the Northern Cemetery of Cairo.

Only the minaret and one of the domed chambers have been preserved to the present day. Until its dismantlement in 2023, the minaret stood around 50 metres (160 ft) to the northwest of the dome. The surviving domed chamber retains a sample of rich stucco decoration, including medallion designs with dense vegetal motifs.

The domed chamber

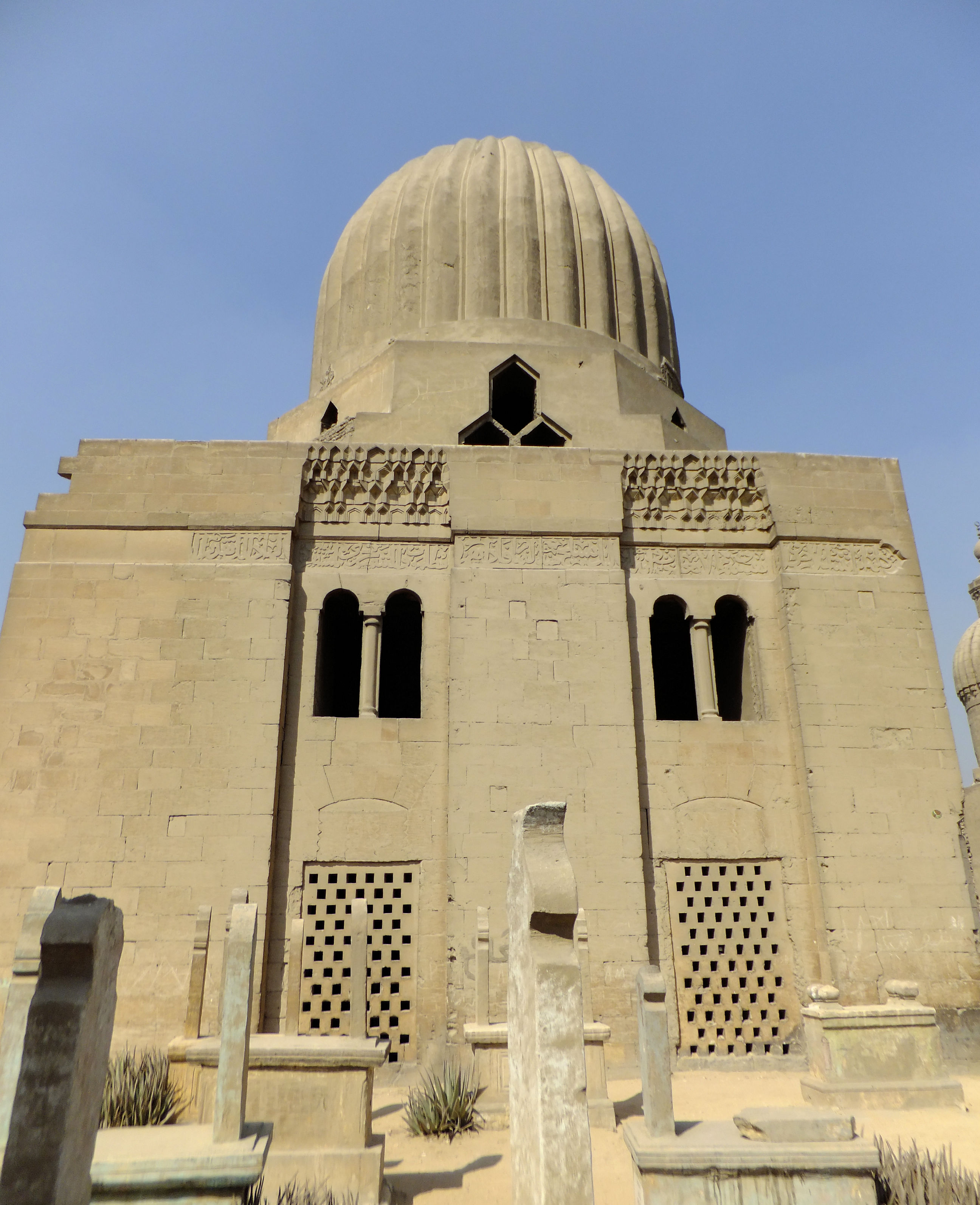
Southeastern exterior façade of the mausoleum chamber

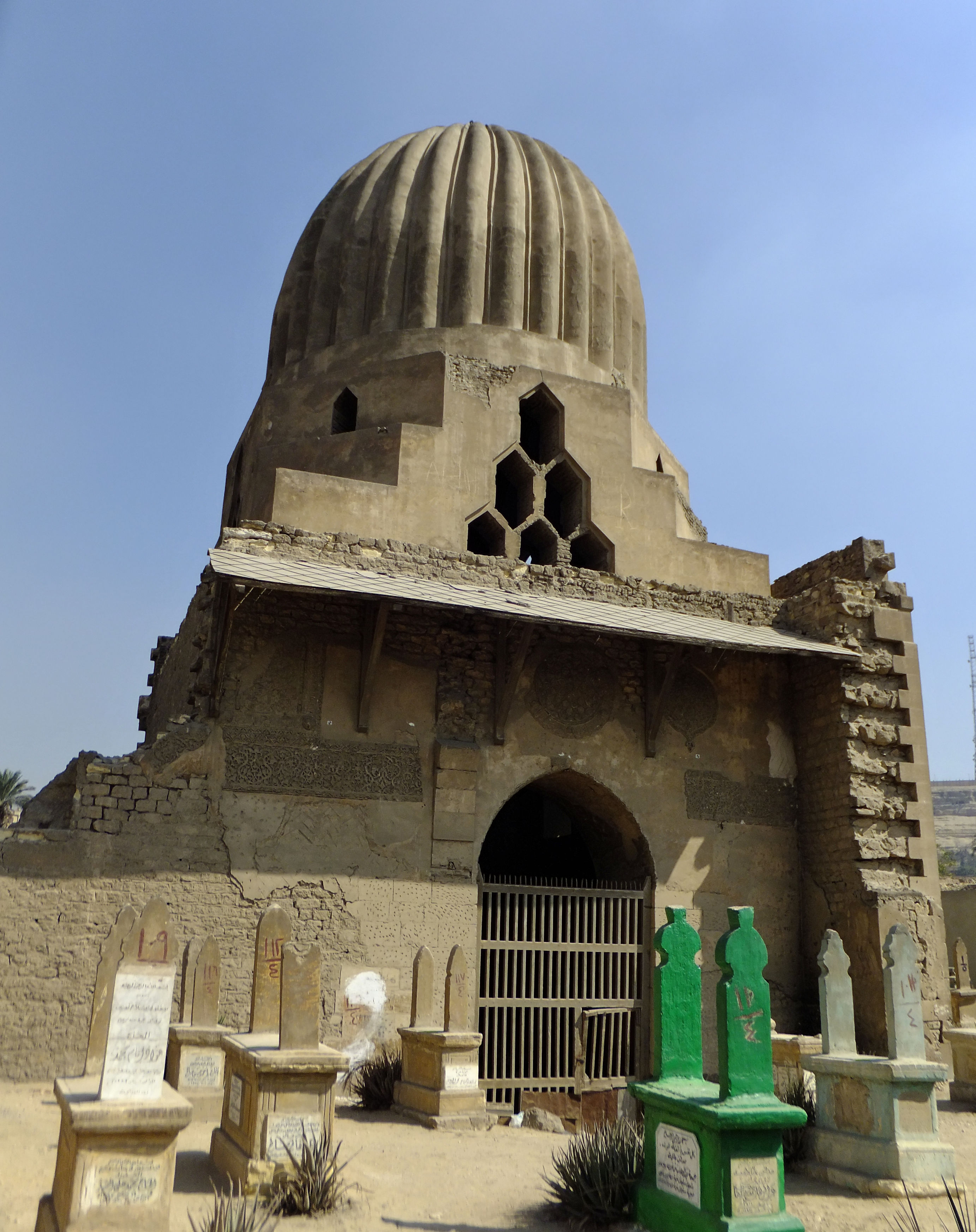
Southwestern façade of the mausoleum chamber

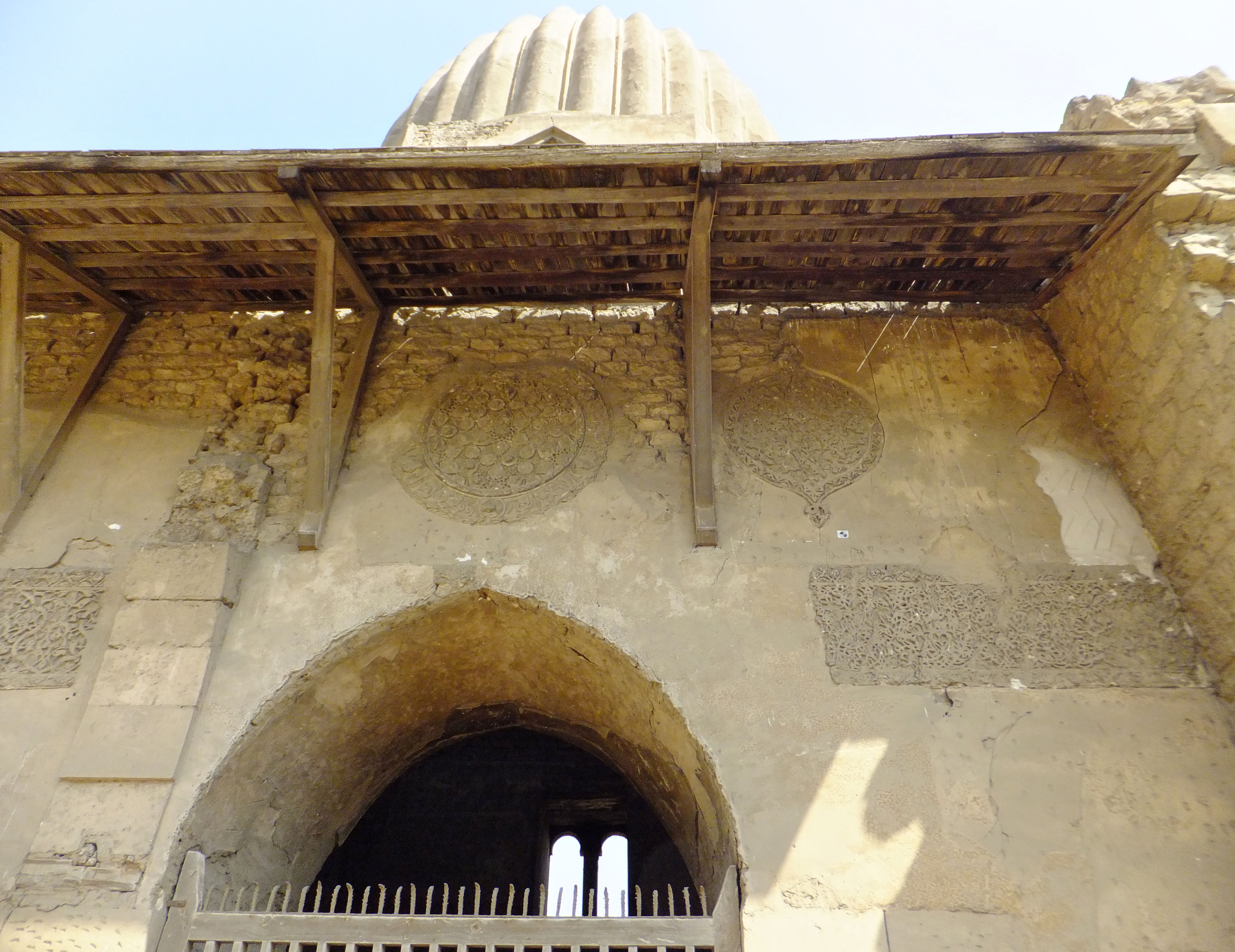
Southwestern façade, with remains of stucco decoration

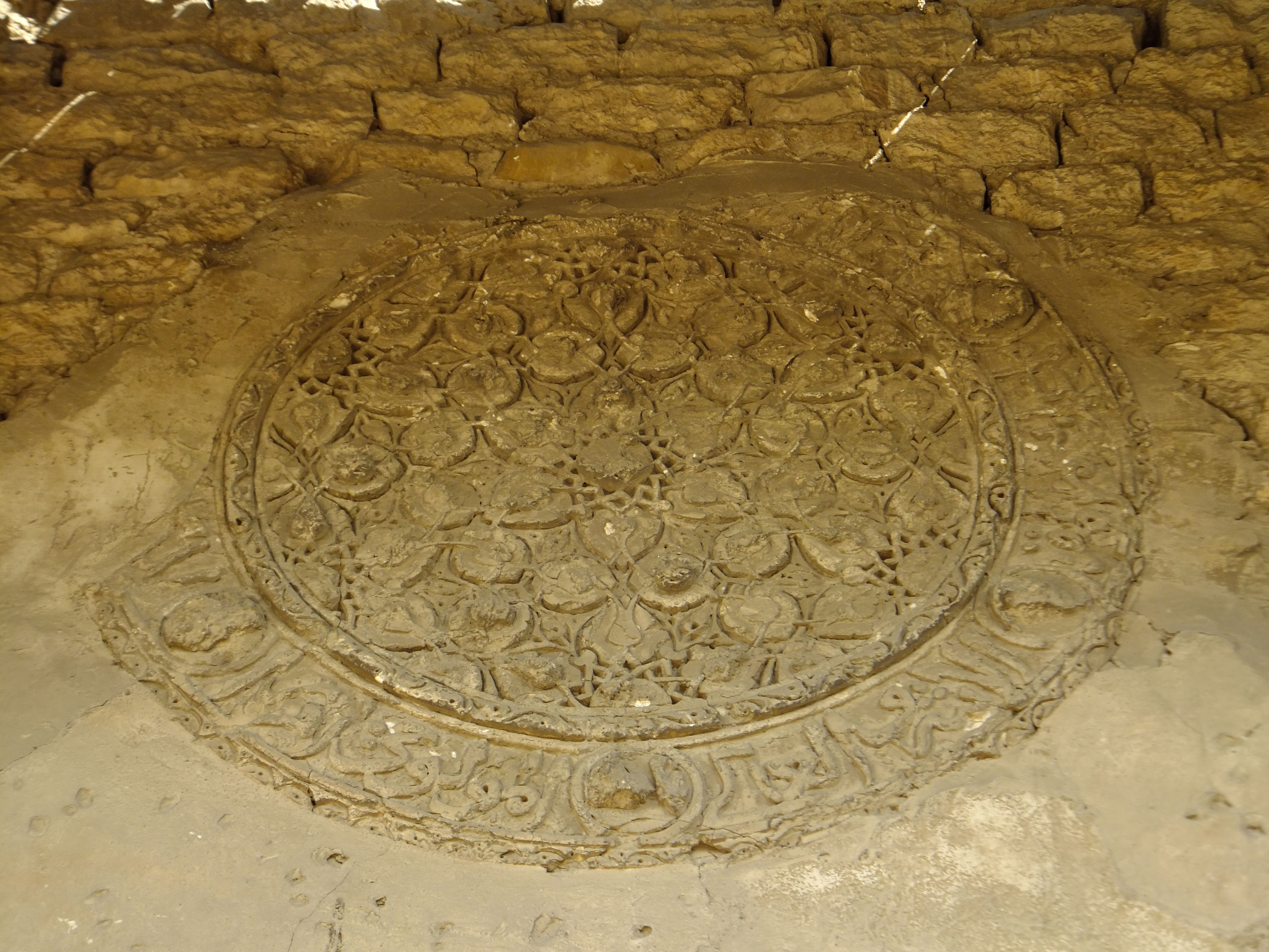
Detail of a carved stucco roundel on the southwestern façade

The minaret is made of stone and ornately carved. Its design reflects the early 14th century style of this period, consisting of three tiers: a square-based bottom tier, followed by an octagonal tier, and topped by a cylindrical lantern-like summit covered by a ribbed dome. It is the last surviving minaret to be built in this particular form. It is carved with muqarnas cornices at each level, with ribbed blind keel arches on its octagonal level, and with an unusual row of spikes running around the base of the summit's dome.

The minaret

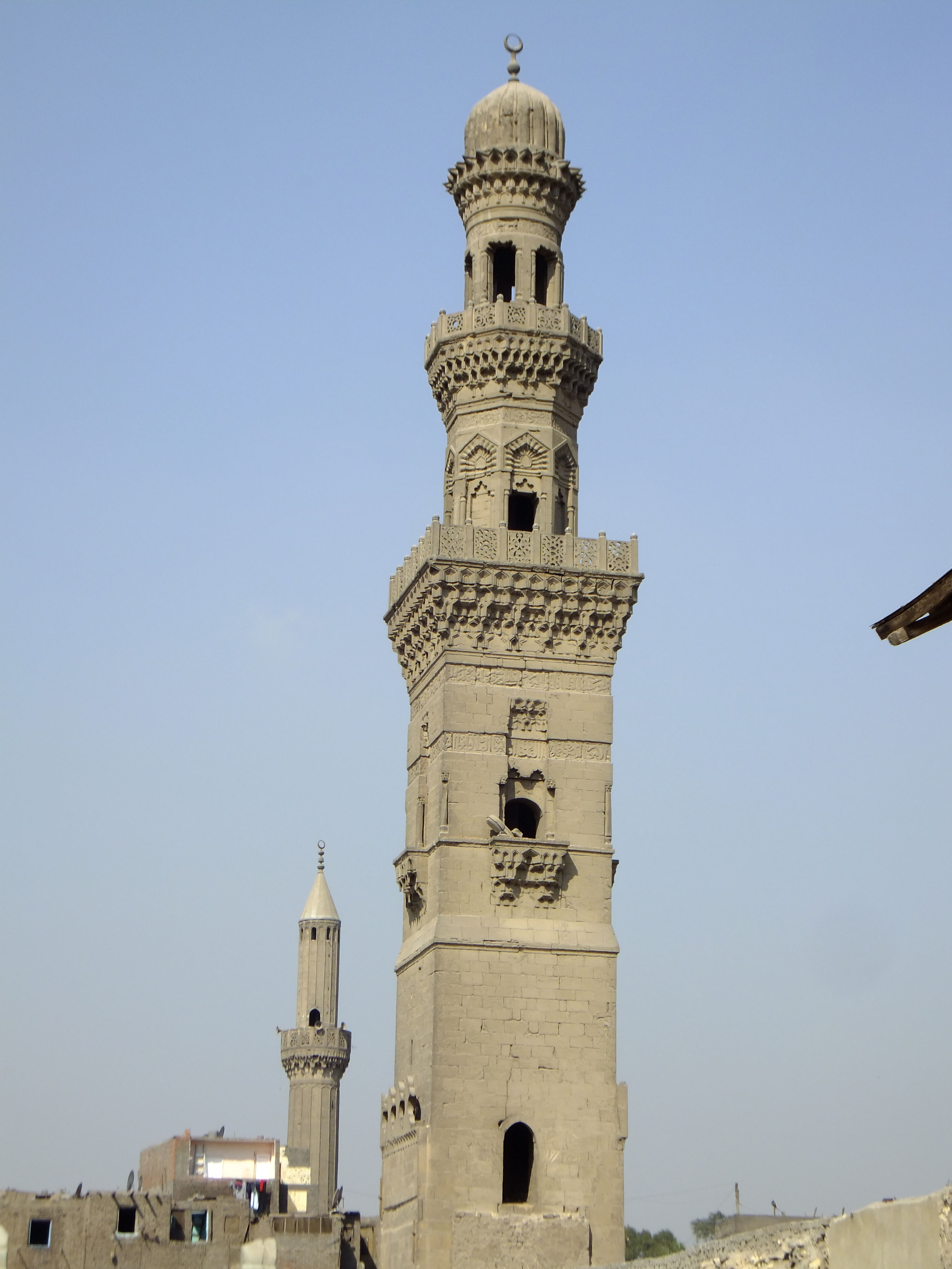
The minaret

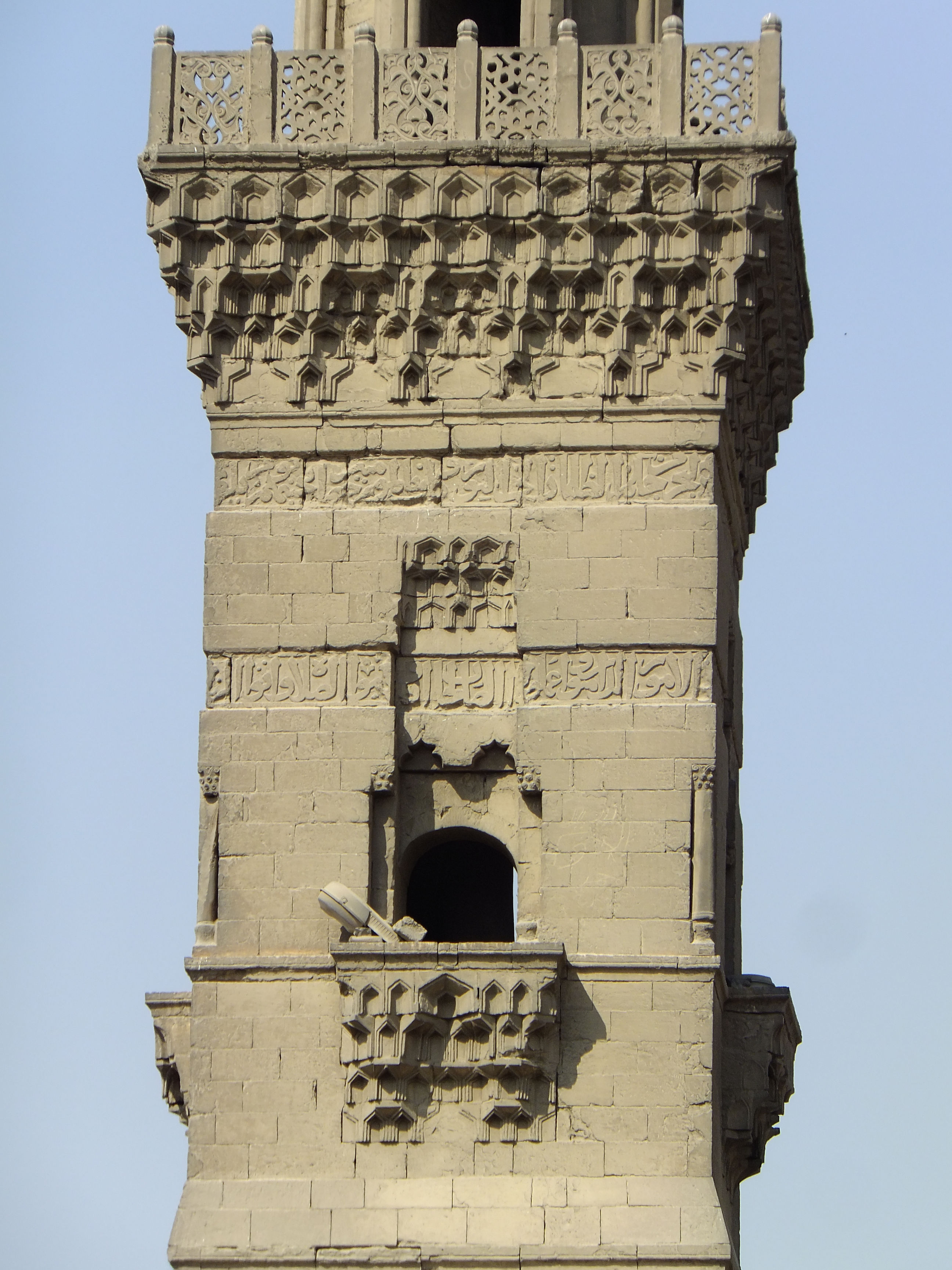
Detail of the first tier/level of the minaret

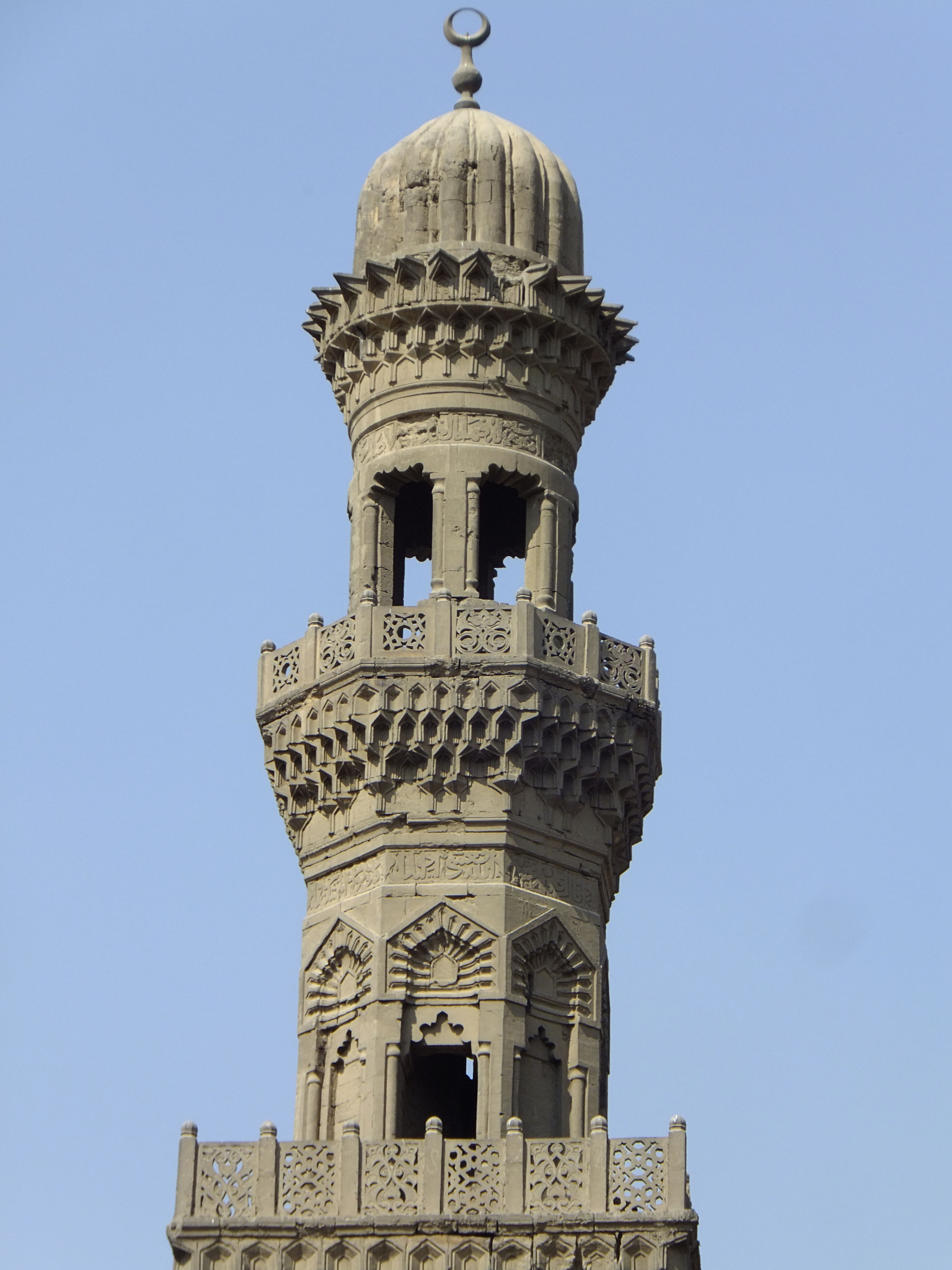
The upper two levels of the minaret

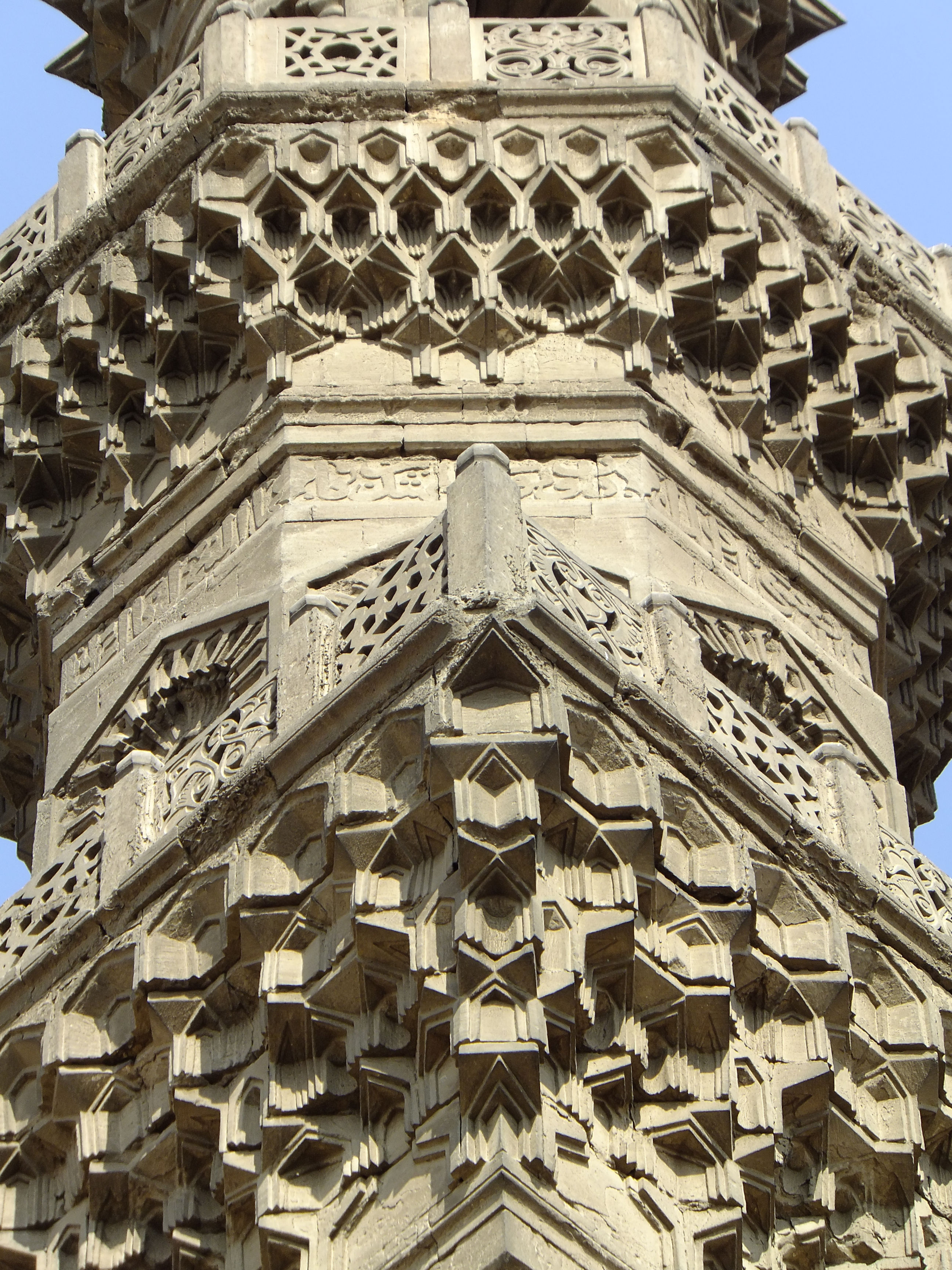
Detail of the stone carving and muqarnas on the minaret

== See also ==
- Late medieval domes
