= Madrasa of Sarghatmish =

School and mosque in Cairo, Egypt

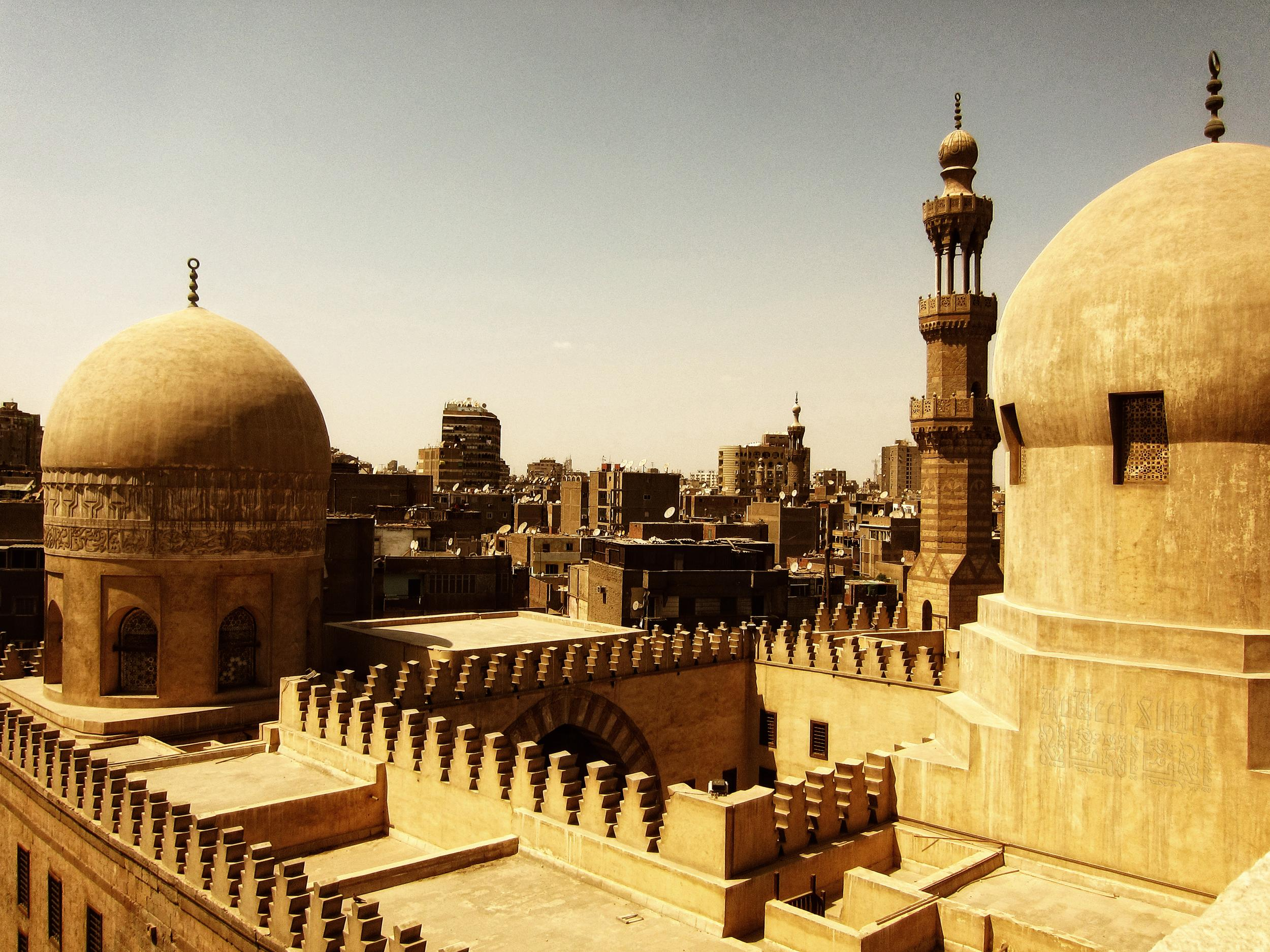
- The madrasa in 2010

Religion
- Affiliation: Sunni Islam
- Sect: Hanafi school
- Ecclesiastical or organisational status: Madrasa; Mosque; Mausoleum
- Status: Active

Location
- Location: Saliba Street, Islamic Cairo
- Country: Egypt
- Interactive map of Madrasa of Sarghatmish
- Coordinates: 30°01′49″N 31°15′05″E

Architecture
- Type: Mosque
- Founder: Sayf al-Din Sarghatmish al-Nasiri
- Completed: 1356 CE

Specifications
- Dome: 2
- Minaret: 1

The Madrasa of Sarghatmish is a madrasa, mosque, and mausoleum, located on Saliba Street in Islamic Cairo, Egypt. Completed in 1356 CE, lthe cruciform building is located to the northeast of the Mosque of Ibn Tulun. The structure's school, mosque, and mausoleum can be seen from Ibn Tulun's spiral minaret. The madrasa is also referred to as the Mosque of Amir al-Sayf Sarghatmish.

== History of Sarghatmish ==
In 1356, Amir Sayf al-Din Sarghatmish al-Nasiri, chief of the corps of Mamluks, ordered the construction of this madrasa.

Sarghatmish began his career under the service of Sultan al-Nasir Muhammad ibn Qalawun, and ended it under the reign of Sultan Husan. According to the renowned Egyptian historian, al-Maqrizi, Sarghatmish was handsome and zealous man who would recite the Qur'an daily and go to legal discussions among Hanafi scholars.

Sarghatmish sought to sponsor the construction of a madrasa that taught in accordance with the Hanafi school. It became a place of refuge for Hanafi students from Iran. Maqrizi noted that Sarghatmish outwardly favored the foreign students to a point of excess. He would personally teach them grammar and promote the students within the community. Sarghatmish's influence in Egypt heightened during the reign of Sultan Husan. When Sarghatmish came back from Damascus, where he had been with the Mamluk troops, he was made vizier to ‘Alam al-Din ‘Abdallah ibn Zunbur, and he took all his wealth without the sultan's knowledge. Sarghatmish's power continued to increase during the early 14th century to the point where he essentially ruled Egypt on the behalf of Hasan. Eventually, however, Sarghatmish fell into Hasan's disgrace and was thrown into jail and murdered in 1358.

== Architecture ==
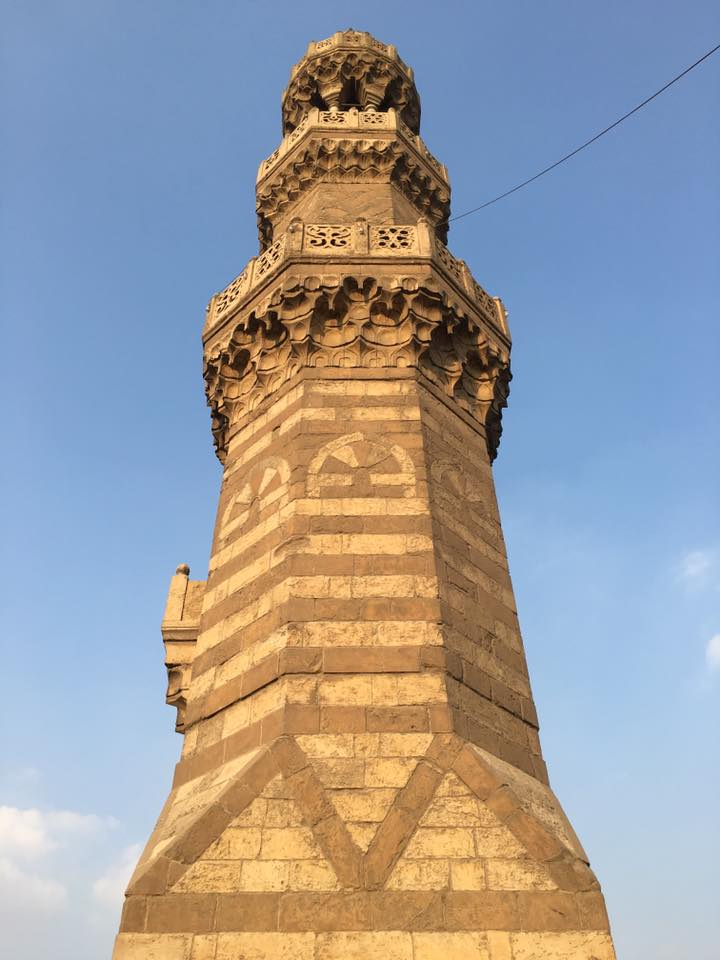
Close-up of the minaret.

The Madrasa of Sarghatmish is an example of Mamluk architectural innovation. The building's four iwan layout is in line with the cruciform, or cross-shaped, madrasa plan. The building's facade faces the street to the northwest, and the domed mausoleum jets out from the south end of the facade and into the street through a rectangular, cross-vaulted space. This madrasa shows the tendency of Mamluk architecture to prefer that the front of the building faces the existing street, while at the same time orienting the interior of the mosque toward the qibla. In this case, the facade is composed of the madrasa and mausoleum, and the mosque is located behind the facade, furthest from the street. This choice to make the secular aspects of the building visible to the public, reflects the Mamluks' tendency to value prestige over piety. The mausoleum was also presented in this fashion in order to attract the attention of pedestrians in hopes of receiving their blessings.

From the outside of the Madrasa of Sarghatmish, one can see its octagonal minaret on the eastern corner of the facade. It was elegantly constructed and has patterns of two-coloured inlaid masonry. The facade itself is 15.5 metres (51 ft) high and contains the main portal to the building's interior. The portal is emphasized by an elevated section of the facade called a pishtaq. Additionally, pendative triangles are seen under the portal's semi-dome. The upper walls of the facade are aligned with small rectangular windows which belong to the living quarters. The windows also appear on the rear facade as part of the students' cells. Outside the building the dome over the mausoleum is clearly visible. The double-shelled, exotic dome is made out of bricks that form an unusually high drum.

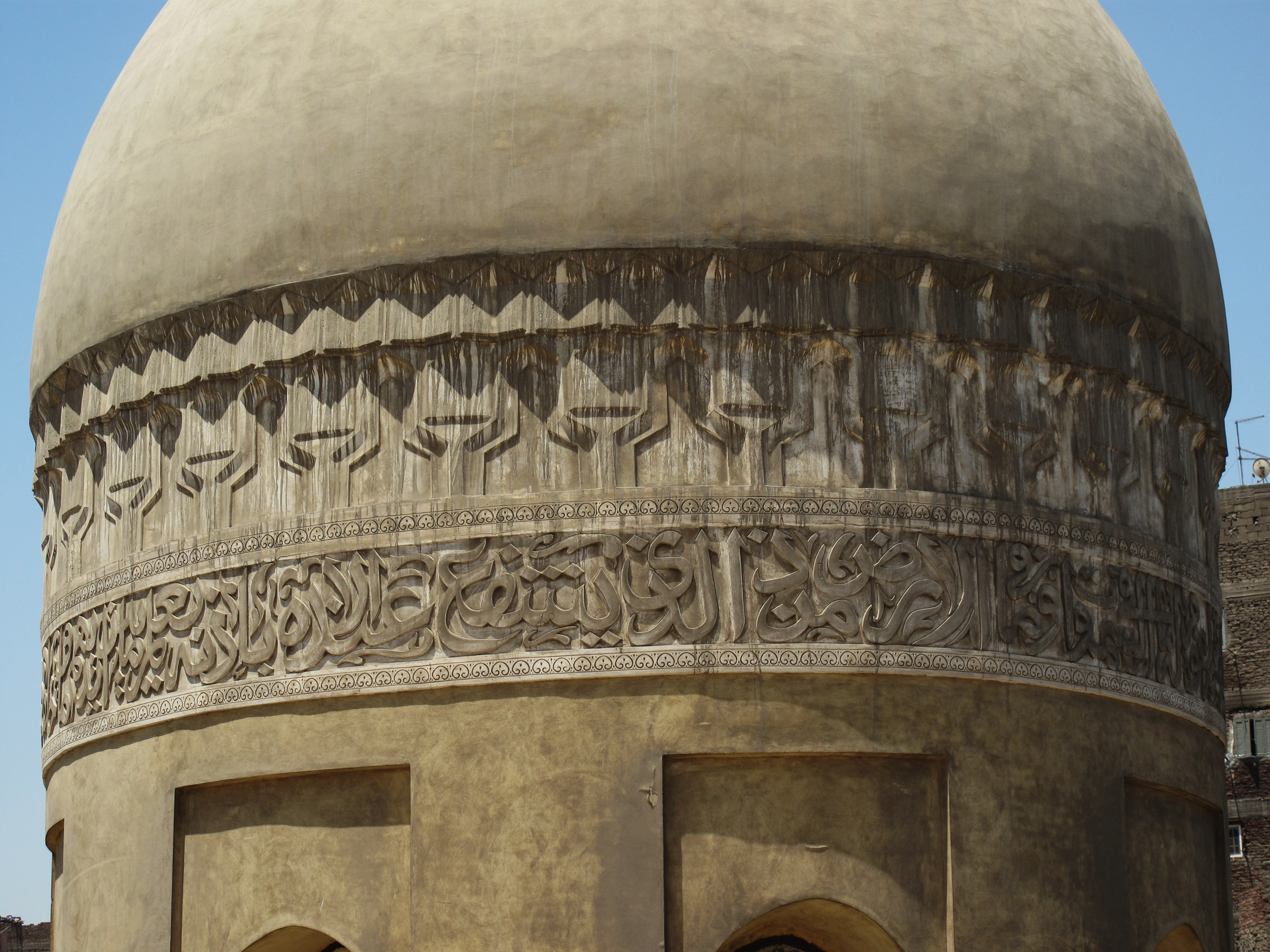
Sarghatmish dome

This type of drum creates a rounded profile which is uncommon in Egyptian architecture. Instead it seems to be reflective of Persian architecture, which may have been inspired by Sarghatmish's celebration of his foreign students, many of whom were from Iran. In addition, muqarnas, or three-dimensional decorative devices used in Islamic and Persian architecture, are inset in this area above the inscription band.

Inside the Madrasa of Sarghatmish is the mosque. An architecturally intriguing spot within the mosque is the mihrab wall. The mihrab is a semi-circular niche in the wall that signifies the location of the qibla, or direction of the Kaaba. This wall is decorated with white marble panes with medallions carved into them. Some carvings on the marble include arabesques, a mosque lamp, birds, and a pair of hands holding a stem. These carvings of actual figures, especially the bird and hands, are unique to Mamluk art and architecture. Mamluk art usually consisted of ornate designs that were almost militant in their intricacy; little of their art included figures or life forms. The panels, however, have since been removed, and are located in the Islamic Museum. At the center of the Madrasa of Sarghatmish is a courtyard with an octagonal fountain in the center. It is in the shape of a pavilion with marble columns that support a wooden dome. This type of dome is a trademark of Mamluk domes. From the courtyard, the student housing is visible. The cells go up three stories in the corners between the four iwans. Some of them overlook the courtyard, and others overlook the street.

== Al-Maqrizi's commentary ==
Al-Maqrizi was a Caireen historian. His main work is the Khitat, which is a topographical description of Cairo's history. Al-Maqrizi discusses the history and architecture of every building in the city in the Khitat.

Specifically, al-Maqrizi focused on the Madrasa of Sarghatmish's origins by describing the history of Sarghatmish himself, which has been explained above. Al-Maqrizi then went on to explain the architectural details as well as the impact of the building in the community. Al-Maqrizi commented on the building itself by saying, "The madrasa became one of the most marvelous and beautiful structures, and one of the most delightful also on the interior." It seems that the Madrasa of Sarghatmish's elegant construction affected people in Cairo so much that some wrote poetry about the structure. Al-Maqrizi quoted one poem,"O Sarghitmish, may what you built hold no importance to you, for your lasting reward is now on account of the beauty of this building. The marble paving, like a bloom in beauty, held him in contempt, for to God should be attributed both bloom and builderspends time."

== Gallery ==
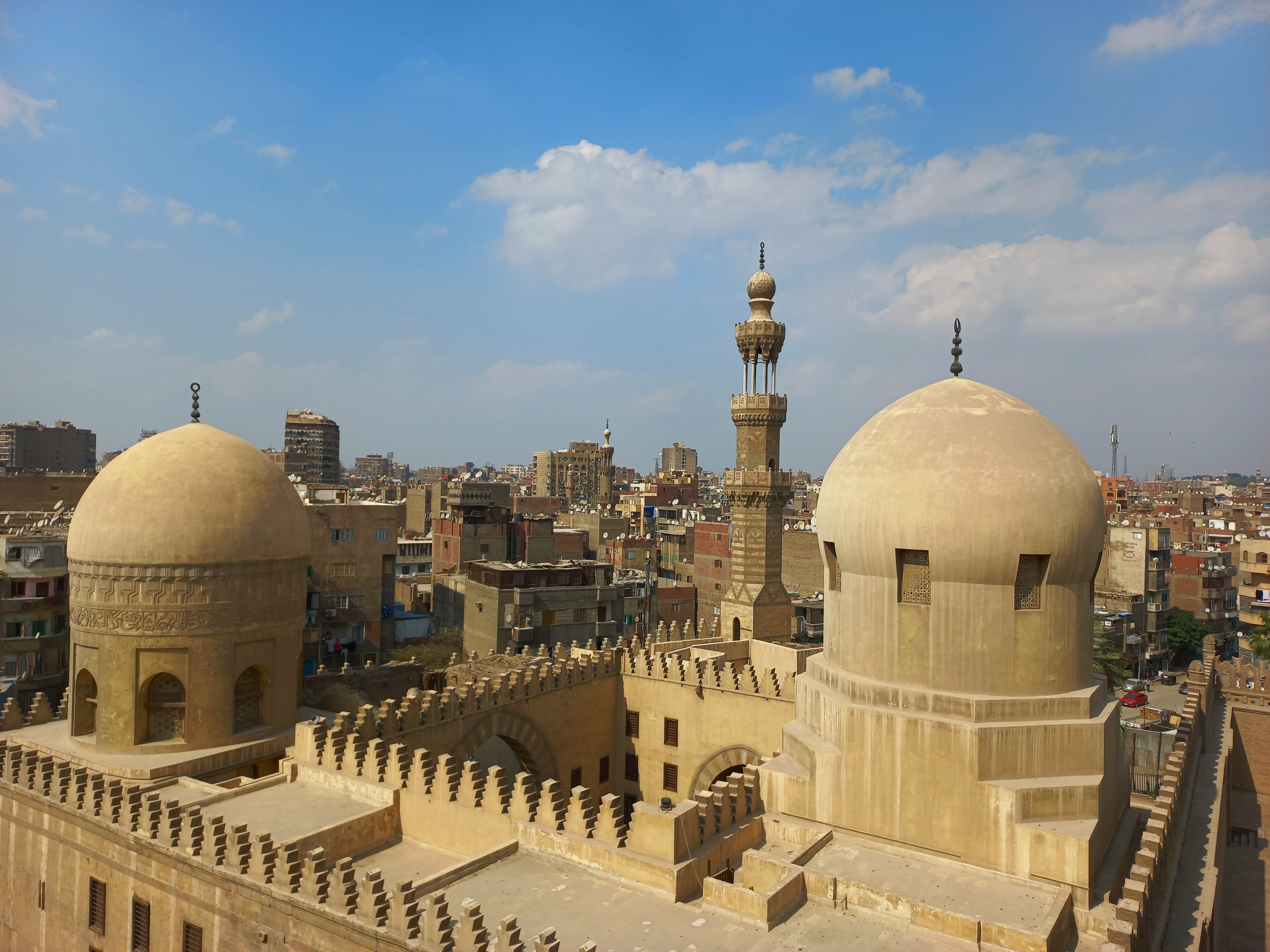
Aerial view of the Mosque and Madrasa of Emir Sirghatmish.

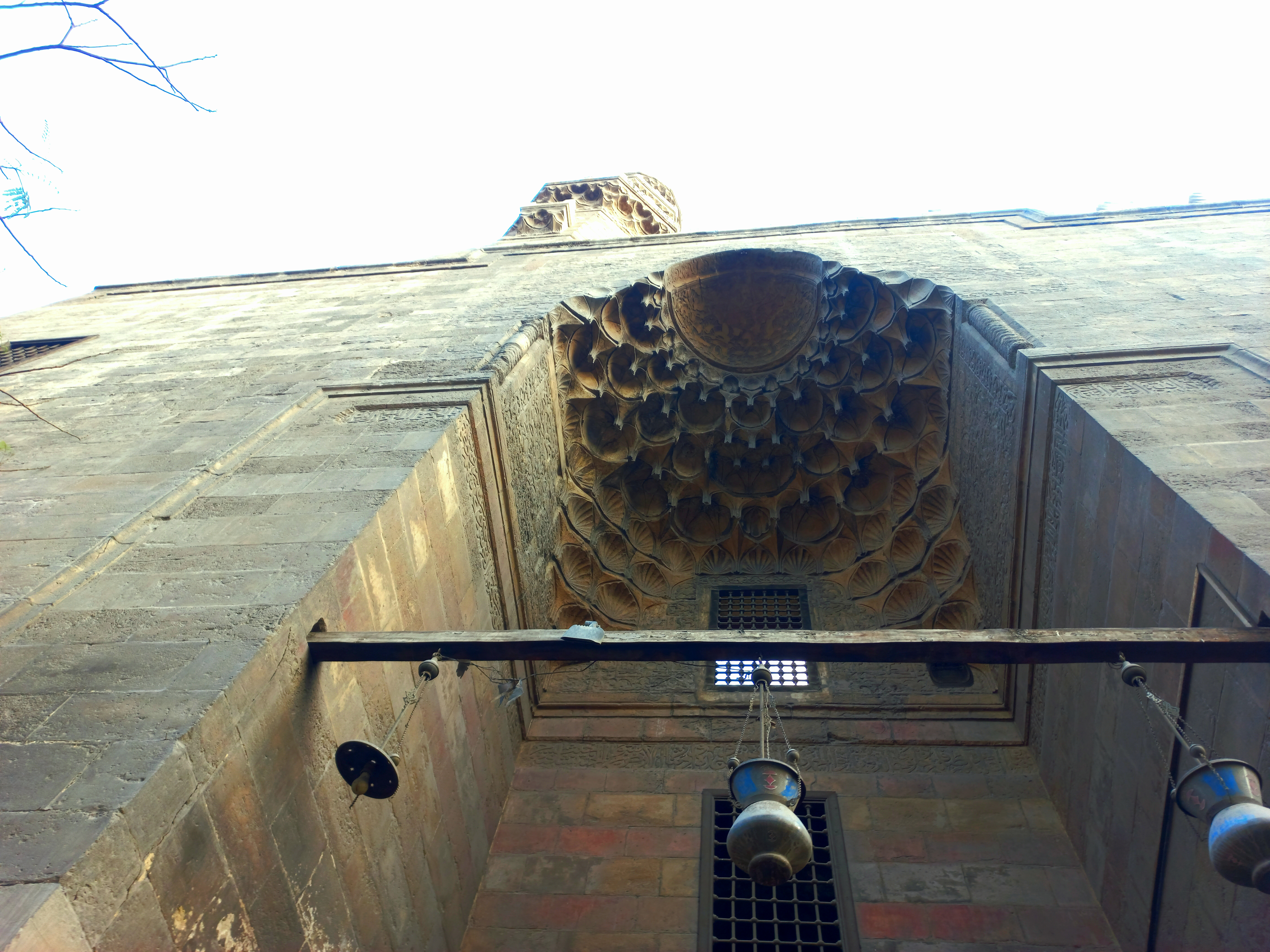
A view of the mosque entrance shows the stone muqarnas, which reflect the evolution of geometric and decorative design in Mamluk architecture.

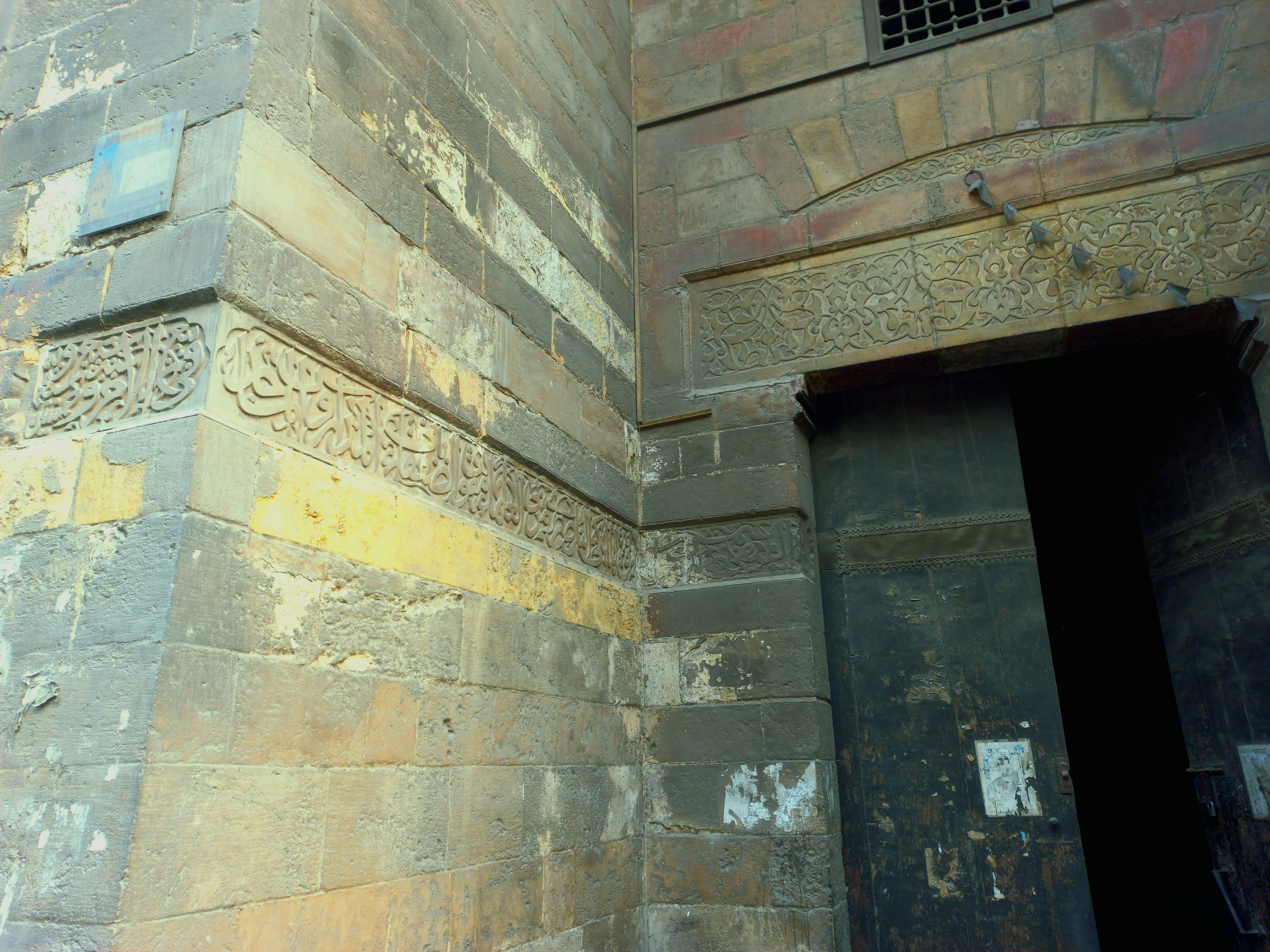
The calligraphic inscriptions and floral motifs carved into the stone, which decorate the facade and entrance.

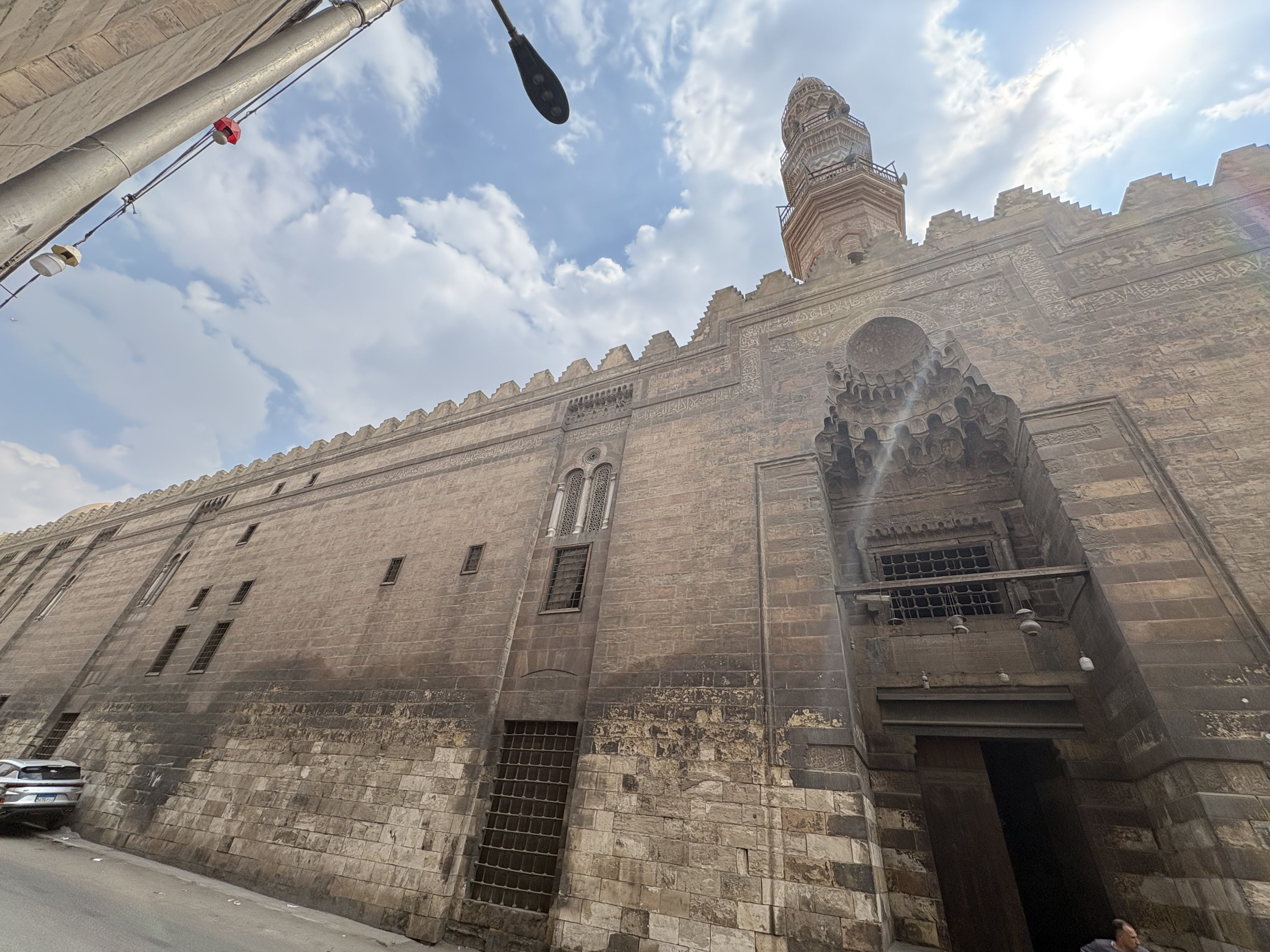
A panoramic view of the main facade of the Mosque and Madrasa of Sarghatmish.

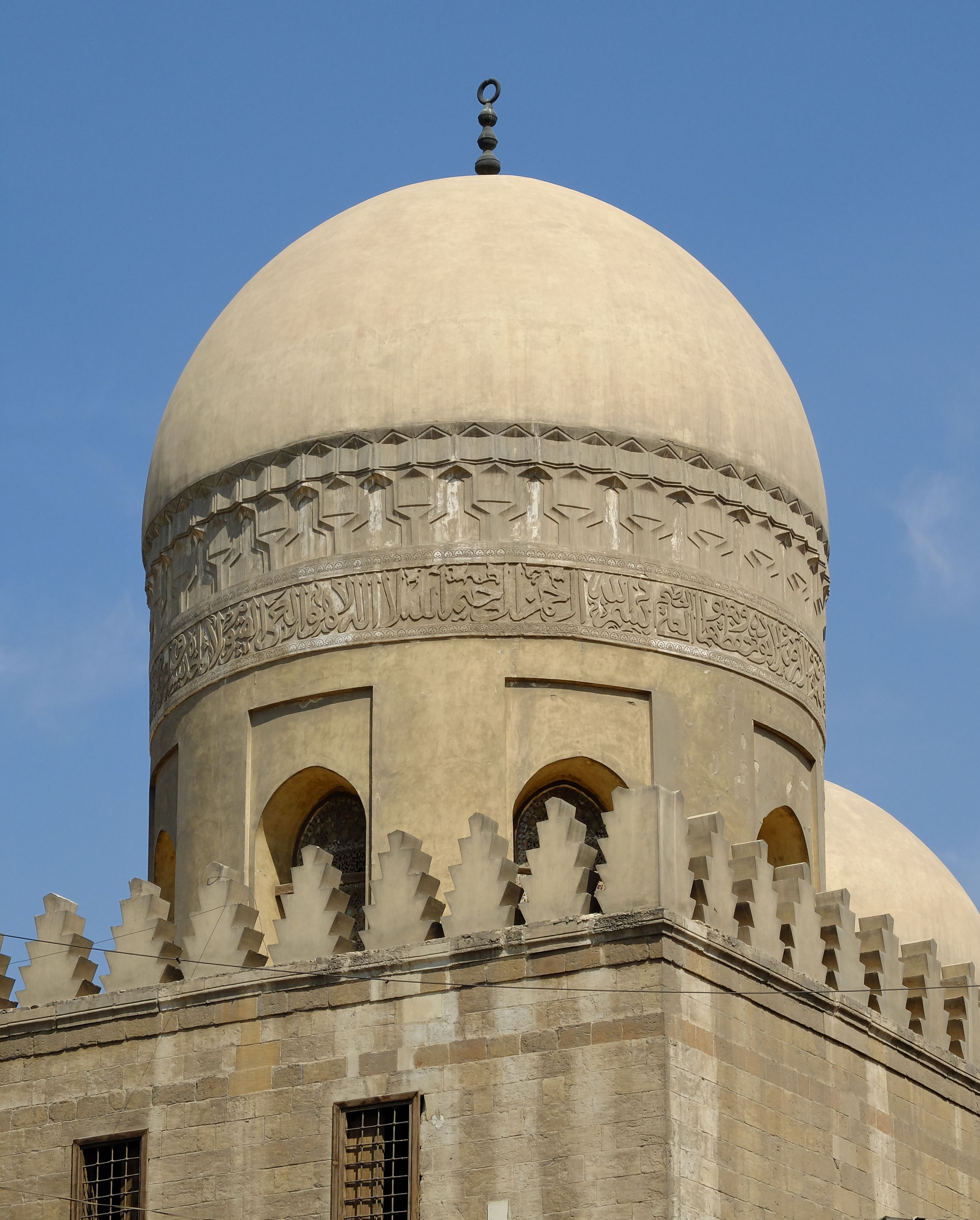
The mausoleum's dome, showing it's drum with a Quranic calligraphic band and carved geometric decorations.

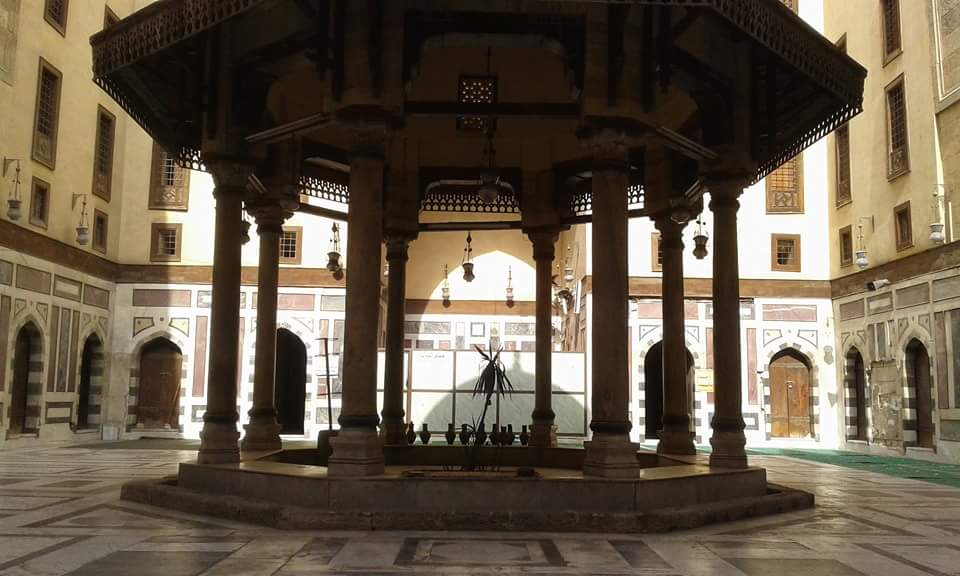
The open central courtyard showing the fountain with its wooden surrounded by four iwans.

== See also ==
- Islam in Egypt
- List of madrasas in Egypt
- List of mausoleums in Egypt
- List of mosques in Cairo
- Late medieval domes
