= Central District (Alexandria) =

Central District حي وسط
- District
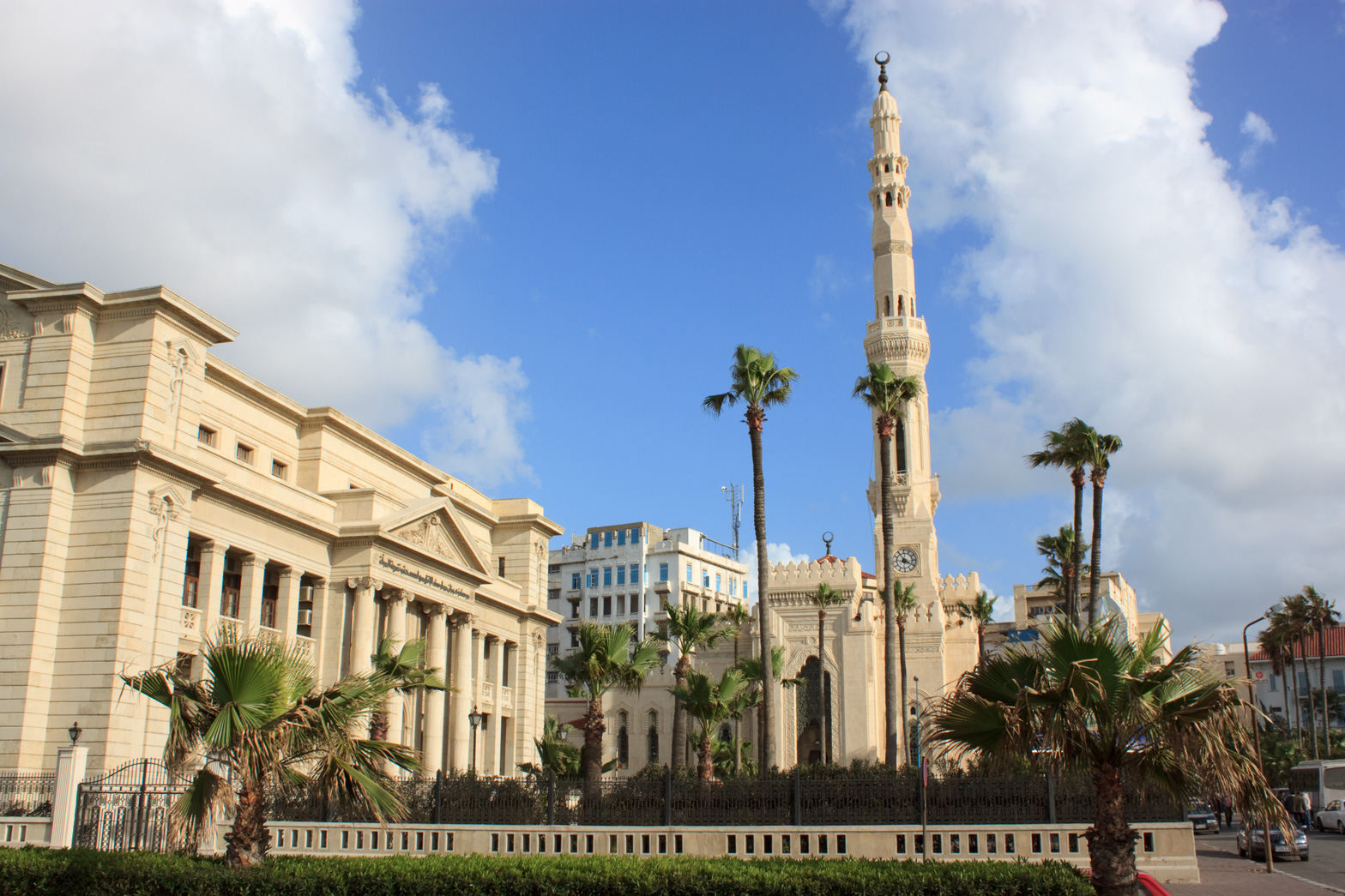
- Al-Qaed Ibrahim Mosque, Mahatet El Raml
- Interactive map of Central District
- Country: Egypt
- Governorate: Alexandria
- Time zone: UTC+2 (EST)

The Central District (Arabic: حي وسط, romanized: Ḥayy Wasat) is an administrative district in Alexandria, Egypt. It is Alexandria's main administrative and educational hub, housing the main campus of Alexandria University and the Bibliotheca Alexandrina. The district also encompasses Downtown Alexandria (Egyptian Arabic: وسط البلد, romanized: Wust El Balad). It is also home to many ancient landmarks, government offices, and residential neighbourhoods.

== Administrative Divisions ==
The Central District is divided into three primary municipal sections (Kism), which are further divided into neighbourhoods and sub-districts (Shiyakha), which are as follows:

- Bab Sharqi Section (Arabic: قسم باب شرقي)
  - Azarita (الأزاريطة)
  - Shatby (الشاطبي)
  - Camp Cesar (كامب شيزار)
  - El Ibrahimiyya (الإبراهيمية)
  - Bab Sharqi and Wabour El Maya (باب شرقي ووابور المياه)
- Moharam Bek Section (Arabic: قسم محرم بك)
  - Moharam Bek (محرم بك)
  - El Hadrah (الحضرة)
- Al-Attarin Section (Arabic: قسم العطارين)
  - El Atareen (العطارين)
  - Kom El Deka (كوم الدكة)
  - Mahatet El Raml (محطة الرمل)

== Landmarks ==
The main landmark in the central district is the Bibliotheca Alexandrina, inaugurated in 2002 as the successor to the ancient Library of Alexandria, which was located in the area. The district is also home to the Al-Qaed Ibrahim Mosque in the Raml Station area, as well as Alexandria Stadium in Moharam Bek, which opened in 1926 and is the oldest active sports stadium in Africa. It also includes the main campus of Alexandria University, established in 1938.

=== Archeological Sites ===
- Kom El Deka
- Shatby Necropolis
- Al-Hadra Tombs

=== Museums ===
- Graeco-Roman Museum
- Alexandria National Museum

== See also ==
- Neighborhoods in Alexandria
