= Wolf Hess =

Wolf Hess may refer to:

- Wolf Rüdiger Hess (1937–2001), son of Rudolf Hess
- Wolf Hess (philatelist), German philatelist
