= Haidara =

Haidara may refer to:

- Haidara (bug), an insect genus in the tribe Coreini

It is also a surname. Notable people with the surname include:

- Amadou Haidara (born 1998), a Malian footballer
- Aminata Haidara (born 1997), a football player
- Chérif Ousmane Madani Haïdara, a religious leader in Mali, and founder of the Sufi Ansar Dine
- Mahamane Haidara (1910–1981), a Malian politician, member of French Senate in 1948
- Massadio Haïdara (born 1992), a French football (soccer) player
- Seydou Junior Haidara (born 1989), a Canadian football player

== See also ==
- Hadara, a neighborhood in Alexandria, Egypt
- Haidar, a name
- Haidara Kontorfilli (1890–1931), a Sierra Leonean charismatic Islamic religious reformer
- Mamma Haidara Commemorative Library, a place in Mali
