= Britannia Centre Spandau =

Former community center of the British allied troops of the Berlin Infantry Brigade

Coordinates: 52°31′15″N 13°11′08″E

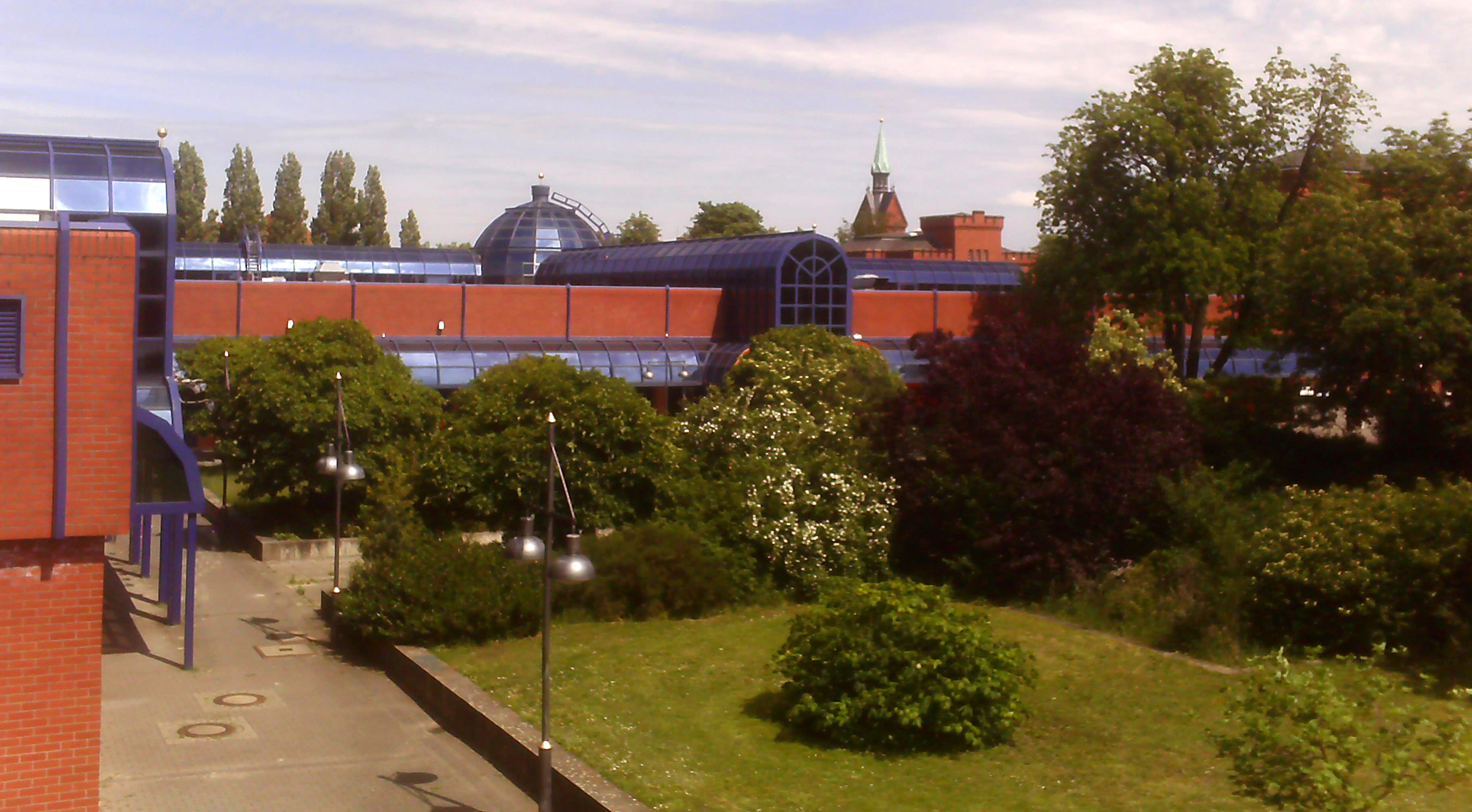
View onto the former Shopping Complex of the former Britannia Centre Spandau in May 2009.

The former Britannia Centre Spandau, previously known as British Forces Families Centre (BFFC), was built in 1990 by the PSA for the British Authorities on the site where Spandau Prison was once located.

Britannia Centre Spandau centralised the main shopping, welfare, employment and broadcasting facilities for the British military community in Berlin.

The Britannia Centre consisted of a new shopping and cinema complex, as well as five existing and completely refurbished two and three-storey buildings. It was opened in phases between September 1990 and mid-1991.

Its buildings are located at the junction of Wilhelmstraße and Gatower Straße next to the former Smuts Barracks in the Wilhelmstadt in Spandau.

== Facilities ==
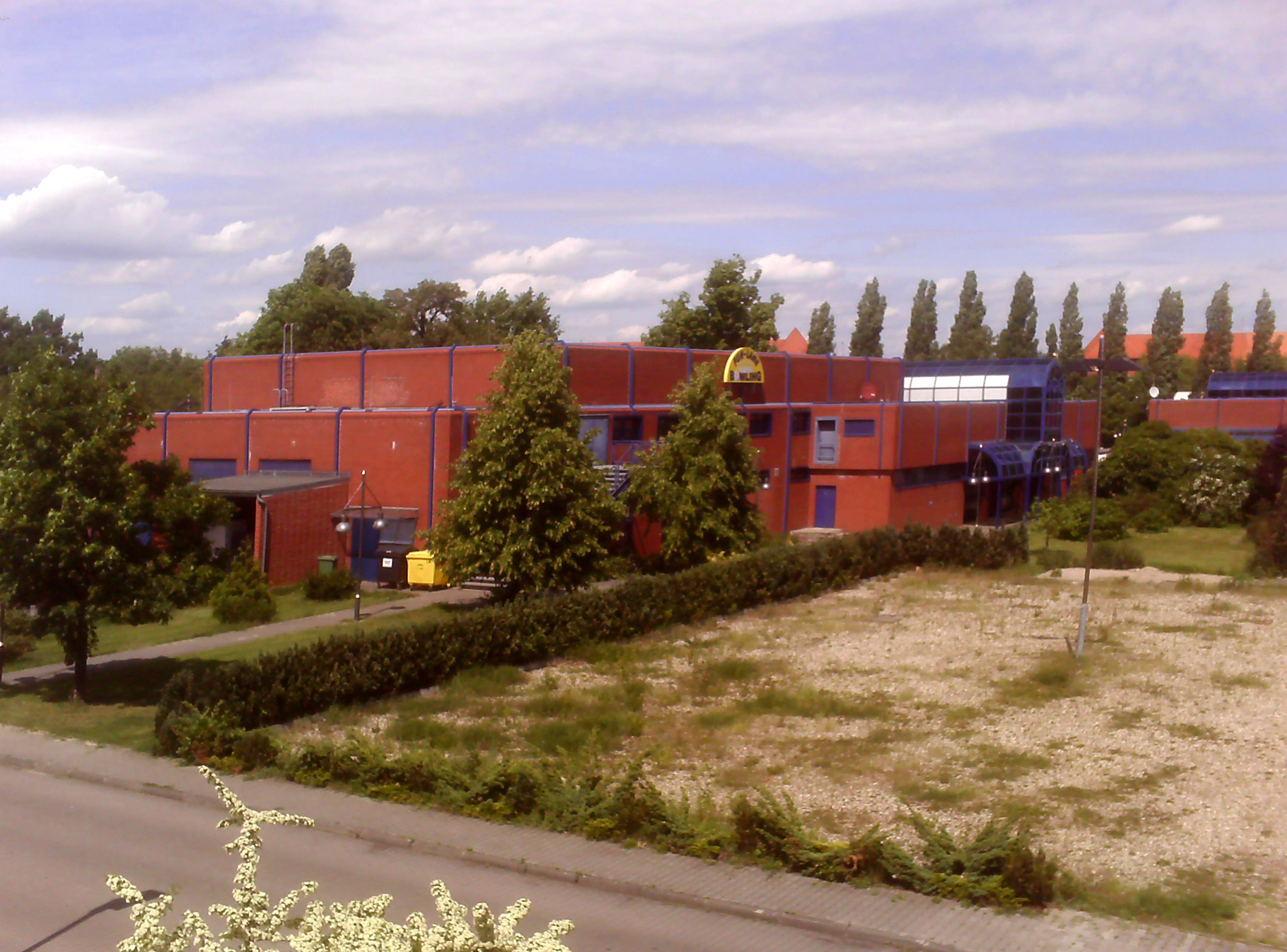
The former Cinema Complex in May 2009.

=== Shopping centre ===
- SSVC – Sound and Vision Centre
- British Forces Post Office – sub office
- NAAFI Financial Services
- His & Hers Hair Studio
- YMCA – book and gift shop
- NAAFI – "A-type" shop
- Burger King restaurant

=== Cinema complex ===
- Jerboa cinema (with 230 seats)
- Public information area
- Bus waiting area
- Bank cash point (ATM)

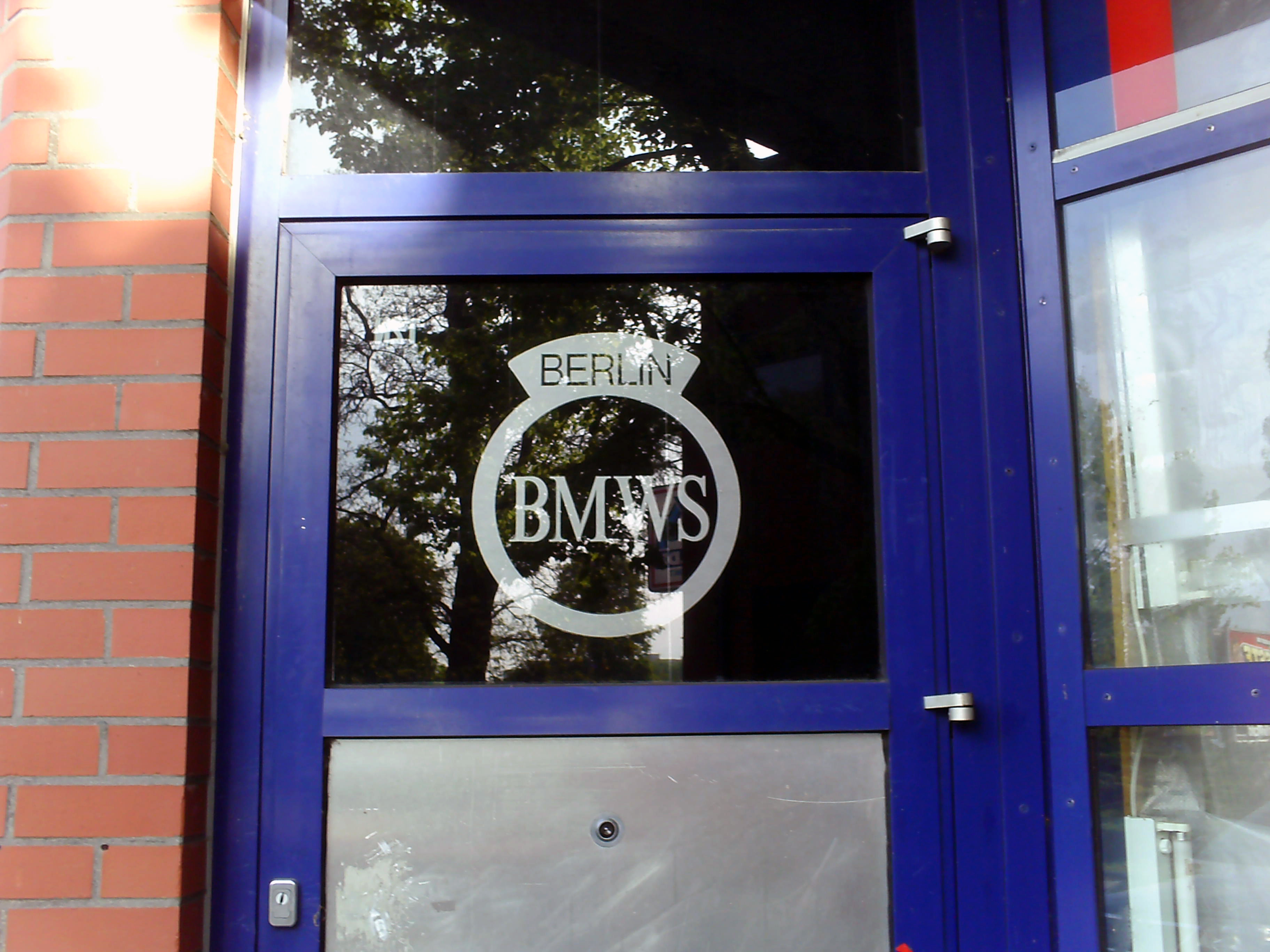
Reminder of the Berlin Military Welfare Service (BMWS) at the demolished Cinema Complex

=== Existing buildings ===
- NAAFI – Area administration
- NAAFI – Imperial Staff Club
- Wool shop
- HIVE
- YMCA administration and staff facilities
- Child minding centre
- BMWS – Berlin Military Welfare Service
- Brigade Travel Office
- Thrift shop
- RAOC tailor facility
- Complex manager
- Station Staff Office (SSO)
- Community RMP Office
- PCLU
- Anglo-German Club
- SSVC engineering workshops
- BFBS studios and offices

== History ==
On 1 August 1946, the Summit House on Theodor-Heuss-Platz was formally opened as a NAAFI Club and was adapted to the changing needs over the years. In 1977 a study recommended the construction of a new facility. At the same time the future of Spandau Prison was put to diplomatic negotiations. In 1982 a Four Power Agreement was reached, which included a statement from the Governing Mayor of Berlin, Richard von Weizsäcker, that Spandau Prison should be demolished as quickly as possible after the death of its lone inmate Rudolf Hess.

Five weeks after the death of Hess on 17 August 1987 at 1610 hours, the demolition of Spandau Prison began and was completed on 4 November 1987.

In May 1988 the construction of the new facility started and was finished on 18 September 1990. The name Britannia Centre was chosen by competition from over 40 entries. The shopping centre was also nicknamed Hessco's after the well known British supermarket chain, Tesco, and the prison's final occupant.

== After British withdrawal ==
After the Berlin Infantry Brigade was dissolved in mid-1994 the Britannia Centre Spandau lost its name and became the only unnamed shopping centre in Berlin. It was used by Kaiser's Tengelmann, ALDI, Media Markt and a few small companies. In late 2008 Media Markt left the main shopping complex leaving the space abandoned. In 2011 the new owner, a development company, applied for permission to demolish the cinema complex of the Britannia Centre. The cinema complex in question was used by ALDI until October 2011. The contracts for both the cinema complex and the shopping complex, which at this time housed Kaiser's, were terminated. Kaiser's left the Shopping Complex on 31 December 2011.

By May 2013 the cinema complex had vanished and the shopping complex had been changed far beyond recognition. The massive glass dome that once sat atop the complex has also been removed. On 20 June 2013, a Kaufland center opened inside.

=== Landmark protection ===
The old two and three-storey buildings, which currently house doctors’ surgeries and other businesses, are all listed as protected landmarks in the Berliner Landesdenkmalliste. The two main buildings were not protected, therefore the responsible office at the Bezirksamt Spandau was unable to refuse the request for demolition.

== Bibliography ==
- Durie, William (2012). The British Garrison Berlin 1945 - 1994: nowhere to go ... a pictorial historiography of the British Military occupation / presence in Berlin. Berlin: Vergangenheitsverlag (de). ISBN 978-3-86408-068-5. OCLC 978161722.
