= Wilhelm Strasse =

Wilhelm Strasse may refer to:

- Wilhelmstrasse, a street in the Mitte and Kreuzberg districts of Berlin, Germany
- Wilhelmstraße (Spandau), a street in the Spandau district of Berlin
- Wilhelmstraße (Wiesbaden), a street in Wiesbaden, Hesse, Germany
- Marshal Ferdinand Foch Street, Bydgoszcz, Poland, originally Wilhelmstraße
- Wilhelmstrasse trial, or Ministries Trial, the Nuremberg trial of foreign ministry officials after World War II
- Wilhelm "Deathshead" Strasse, fictional antagonist in the Wolfenstein video game series
