= Azarita =

Azarita الأزاريطة
- Neighborhood
- The Bibliotheca Alexandrina in northern Azarita.

- Location in Egypt
- Coordinates: 31.206121°N 29.914813°E
- Country: Egypt
- Governorate: Alexandria
- Time zone: UTC+2 (EET)
  - Summer (DST): UTC+3 (EEST)

Azarita (Arabic: الأزاريطة) is a neighborhood in Alexandria, Egypt. Located within the Central District, it sits between El Gomrok, El Atareen, Shatby, and the Mediterranean coast. It is one of the oldest neighborhoods in the city and highly representative of Downtown Alexandria, featuring prominent examples of ancient Greek and Roman architecture.

== History ==
The establishment of Azarita dates back to the reign of Muhammad Ali Pasha. As part of his efforts to modernise Alexandria, he established a health council in the city. However, following the spread of cholera, he thought about introducing a European-style quarantine system and convened foreign consuls to form a committee. This led to the decision establish Egypt's first maritime quarantine station, located next to the eastern port where European and other foreign vessels docked. The station was named “Lazarette” in reference to the first quarantine station built in France in Sainte-Marie-de-Ré on the island of Île de Ré. This place (the quarantine place) is currently occupied by the main university hospital (the Amiri Hospital). The word "Lazarette" is of Latin origin and means "Ladre", meaning the leper. The western countries used to exaggerate the quarantine on lepers, so they would put them in quarantine for their entire lives. From that word, the word "Azarita" was derived.

== Notable people ==
The Azarita neighborhood witnessed the presence of great historical figures, including:

- Plato, the most famous Greek philosopher.
- Archimedes, famous naturalist and mathematician.
- The famous Alexandrian philosopher Hypatia.
- International film director Youssef Chahine.
- Greek singer Demis Roussos.
- Egyptian singer Mustafa Qamar.
