= Wolf Rüdiger Hess =

German architect

- Born: 18 November 1937; Munich, Nazi Germany
- Died: 24 October 2001 (aged 63); Munich, Germany
- Occupation: Architect

Wolf Rüdiger Hess (German: Wolf Rüdiger Heß; 18 November 1937 – 24 October 2001) was a German architect. He was the only child of Rudolf Hess, Adolf Hitler's deputy in the Nazi Party, and Ilse Hess (née Pröhl). He became known for his lifelong efforts to secure his father's release from prison and subsequently to rehabilitate his reputation.

== Early life ==
Born in Munich, Hess lived with his parents until his father's flight to Scotland on 14 May 1941. After that, his father was denounced by the Nazi government as "mentally ill", and this led his mother to leave Munich and take her son to live at the family's house in the country, at Bad Oberdorf, a small spa village in the Allgäu Alps. There, young Wolf Rüdiger gained the lifelong nickname of "Buz". On 3 June 1947, Hess's mother was arrested by Allied forces, together with all the wives of the other Germans convicted at Nuremberg, and she was interned at Augsburg-Göggingen camp. Hess then lived with an aunt until his mother's release in March 1948. He began to attend a local high school in 1947 and then from the mid-1950s studied architecture, qualifying as an architect in 1961.

== Activism ==
Hess gained prominence for criticising an investigation into his father's alleged suicide while serving a life sentence in Spandau Prison in Berlin. Hess maintained that the investigation was a cover-up, and that the British Secret Intelligence Service (SIS) had murdered him. He believed that they had done this to prevent his father's parole – which he believed to be imminent – because the British government was afraid that he would reveal embarrassing information about British actions during World War II. Wolf Rüdiger Hess and his father's lawyer, Alfred Seidl, arranged their own autopsy.

Hess wrote three books: My Father Rudolf Hess (1986), Who Murdered My Father, Rudolf Hess? (1989) and Rudolf Hess: I Regret Nothing (1994/1998). Hess was head of the Rudolf-Heß-Gesellschaft e.V. before his death.

== Death ==
At the age of 63, Wolf Rüdiger Hess suffered a stroke and was taken to a Munich hospital, where he died. He left a widow and three children. Little is known about his children apart from his son Wolf Andreas Hess, who Wolf Rüdiger Hess was immensely pleased was born on 20 April, Hitler's birthday. Wolf Andreas Hess, a computer programmer, planned to create a website dedicated to his grandfather, Rudolf Hess. However, he never finished this after he was fined in Germany in 2002 for denying the existence of gas chambers at Dachau on the Internet.
