= Ilse Hess =

German author, Nazi and wife of Rudolf Hess (1900–1995)

- Born: Ilse Pröhl; 22 June 1900; Hannover, Germany
- Died: 7 September 1995 (aged 95); Lilienthal, Lower Saxony, Germany
- Education: Ludwig-Maximilians-Universität München
- Notable work: England – Nürnberg – Spandau. Ein Schicksal in Briefen (1952)
- Spouse: Rudolf Hess (m. 1927; died 1987)
- Children: Wolf Rüdiger Hess
- Parent(s): Friedrich Pröhl; Elsa Meineke

Ilse Hess (née Pröhl; 22 June 1900 – 7 September 1995) was the wife of Rudolf Hess. After World War II she became a well-known author.

== Family ==
Ilse Pröhl came from a conservative and nationalist family. She was one of three daughters of the wealthy physician and doctor Friedrich Pröhl and his wife Elsa (née Meineke). Her father was killed in May 1917 during the First World War. Her mother then married artist Carl Horn, director of the Bremen Art Museum.

== Relationship with Rudolf Hess ==
Ilse met Rudolf Hess in April 1920 in Munich. She was one of the first women to study at the Ludwig-Maximilians-Universität München. In 1921, she joined the NSDAP (Nazi Party) for the first time, and rejoined in 1925 (member number 25,071) after the party had been banned. She felt drawn to Rudolf Hess from the beginning, but Hess was reluctant to enter into a relationship. Ilse introduced Hess to Adolf Hitler, who liked to travel in the circles of well-to-do ladies. Hitler finally gave the impetus to the marriage, which took place on 20 December 1927 in Munich. Hitler was also the godfather of her only child, Wolf Rüdiger Hess, who was born on 18 November 1937. After Rudolf Hess's flight to Scotland, Ilse left Munich with her son to live in Hindelang.

== After the war ==
On 3 June 1947, Ilse Hess, like all the wives of the war criminals condemned or executed during the Nuremberg trials, was arrested and transferred to the internment camp in Augsburg-Göggingen. On 24 March 1948 she was released and settled down in the Allgäu, where she opened a pension in 1955.

Ilse Hess was a dedicated Nazi. Until her death, she remained loyal to Hitler and his views, and supported the Stille Hilfe after the war. Her 1952 book England – Nürnberg – Spandau. Ein Schicksal in Briefen was published by the far-right Druffel-Verlag. She maintained correspondence with, among others, Winifred Wagner, who also continued to admire Hitler.

== Publications ==
- Ein Schicksal in Briefen. Leoni am Starnberger See: Druffel-Verlag, 1971 (more than 40 editions).
- Antwort aus Zelle 7. Leoni am Starnberger See: Druffel-Verlag, 1967.
- England – Nürnberg – Spandau. Leoni am Starnberger See: Druffel-Verlag, 1967.
- Gefangener des Friedens – Neue Briefe aus Spandau. Leoni am Starnberger See: Druffel-Verlag, 1955.
