= Al Hadra University Hospital =

- Alexandria University Hospitals
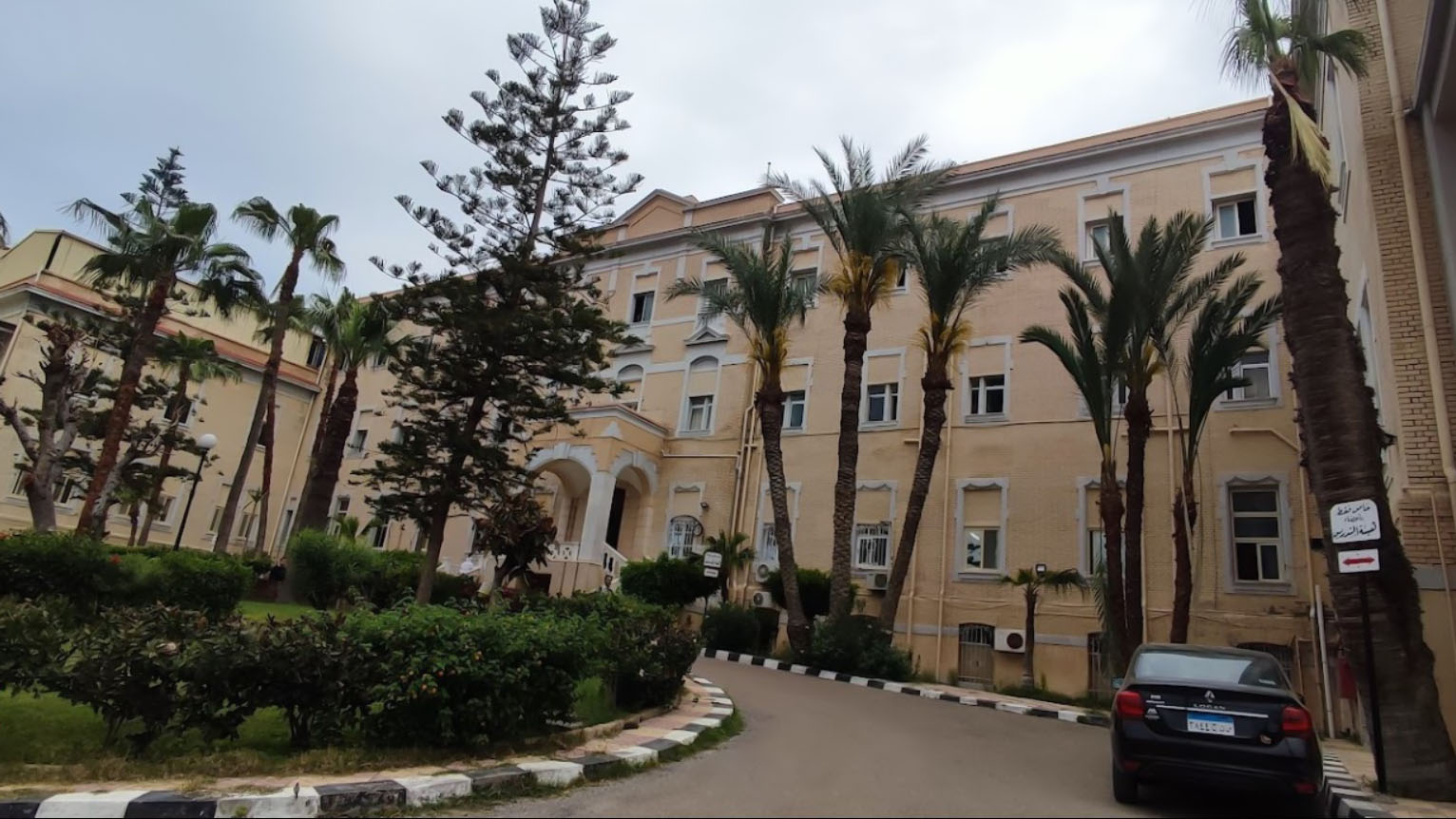
- The main building

Geography
- Location: Al Hadrah, Alexandria, Egypt
- Coordinates: 31°11′53″N 29°55′24″E

Organisation
- Care system: Ministry of Higher Education (Egypt)
- Type: Teaching hospital
- Affiliated university: Faculty of Medicine, Alexandria University.

Services
- Beds: 388 (2015)

History
- Opened: 1886; 140 years ago

Al Hadra University Hospital or Narriman Hospital (Arabic: مستشفى الحضرة الجامعي) is a government teaching hospital One of Alexandria University Hospitals, It is located in the Al Hadrah area in Alexandria on an area of about 5.5 acres, It was established in 1886 by the German community in Alexandria, and was called "Prussia Hospital", the hospital's capacity in 2015 was about 388 beds, it received 27,218 patients, and 8,785 surgical operations were performed.

== See also ==
- Borg El Arab University Hospital
