= Wilhelmstraße (Spandau) =

Street in Spandau, Berlin, Germany

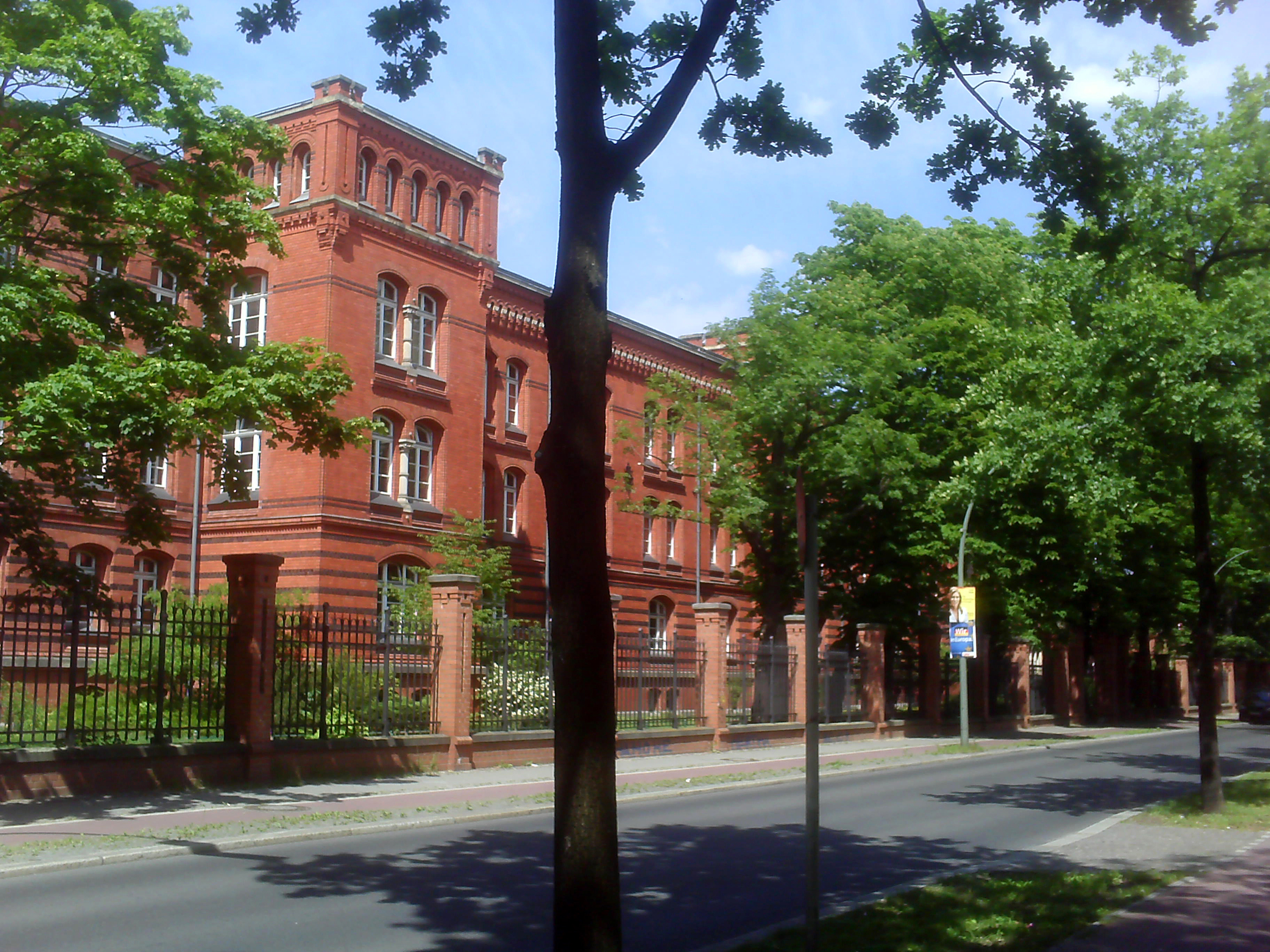
The former Smuts Barracks of the British Berlin Armoured Sqn & Engineers 2009

The Wilhelmstraße (German pronunciation: [ˈvɪlhɛlmˌʃtʁaːsə]) in the Berliner district of Spandau is the connecting street between Spandau and Potsdam. In the north, at Seeburger Straße and the Ziegelhof, the Wilhelmstraße runs into the Klosterstraße, about a kilometre south of Spandau Station.

It crosses the Heerstraße and from there on southwards it is also the Bundesstraße 2. At its southern end, at the „Seeburger Zipfel“ at Karolinenhöhe the Wilhelmstraße runs into the Potsdamer Chaussee.

== History ==
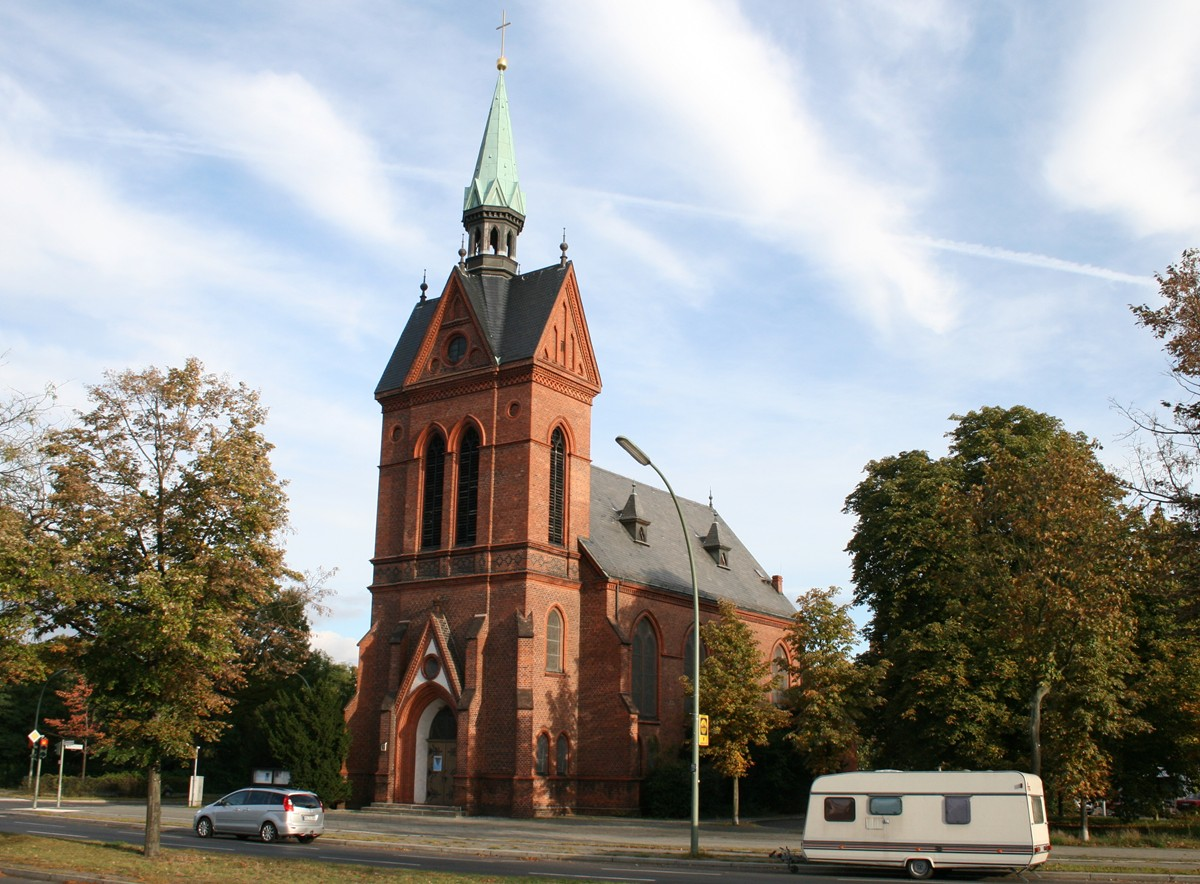
Melanchthon Church

In honour of Emperor William I's 100th Birthday in 1897, the Potsdamer Chaussee was renamed north of Karolinenhöhe into „Wilhelmstraße“. The Wilhelmstadt also got its name around this time. Before the Wilhelmstadt was called „Potsdamer“ or also „Pichelsdorfer Vorstadt“.

The barracks were built between 1883 and 1886, then housing a train unit. Since the time when Spandau was part of the British Sector of Berlin the „Trainkaserne“ is also known as Smuts Barracks. The Lutheran congregation of the close-by Melanchthon Church (EKBO), built in 1893, hosted the British garrison church community between 1945 and 1954, besides the new 1950-built Anglican St. George's Church in Westend, replacing its predecessor Englische Kirche zu St. Georg on Oranienburger Straße, destroyed in 1943 and 1944.

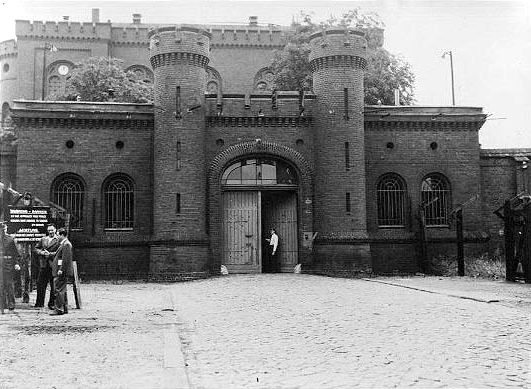
Spandau Prison 1951

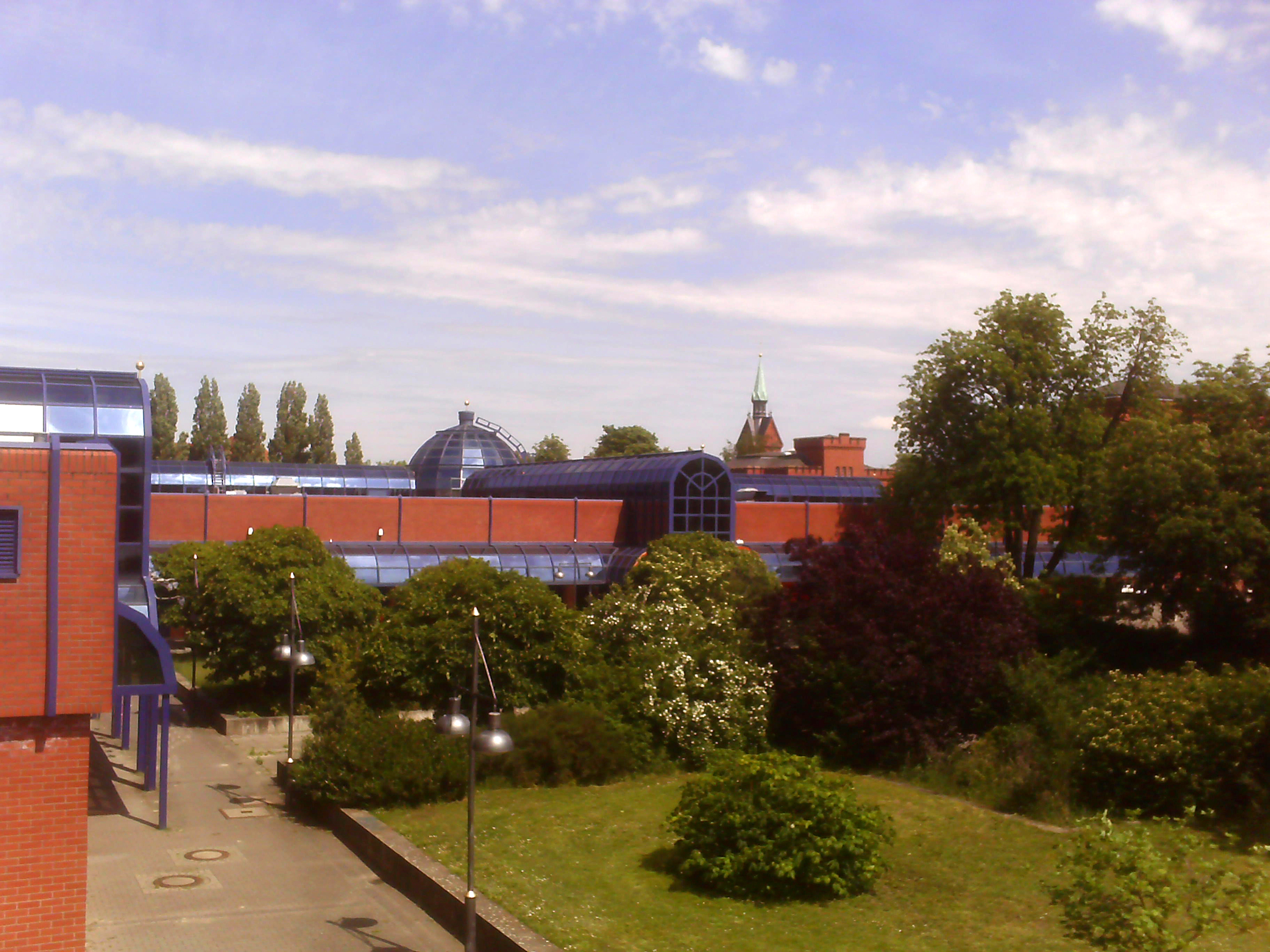
The shopping complex of the former Britannia Centre Spandau

Spandau Prison, also in Wilhelmstraße, was completed in 1881. It was occupied by seven war criminals, convicted in the Nuremberg Trials, including Rudolf Heß who committed suicide there. After he had died, the prison was demolished and a social and shopping centre, The Britannia Centre Spandau, was built there. At the corner Wilhelmstraße to Heerstraße is also a bus depot of the Berliner Verkehrsbetriebe (BVG).

== See also ==
- Berlin-Wilhelmstadt
