= Spandau Prison =

Prison in West Berlin from 1876 to 1987

Coordinates: 52°31′16″N 13°11′07″E

Spandau Prison was a military prison located in the Spandau borough of West Berlin (present-day Berlin, Germany). Built in 1876, it became a proto-concentration camp under Nazi Germany. After the Second World War, it held seven top Nazi leaders convicted in the Nuremberg trials. After the death of its last prisoner, Rudolf Hess, in August 1987, the prison was demolished and replaced by a shopping centre for the British forces stationed in Germany to prevent it from becoming a neo-Nazi shrine.

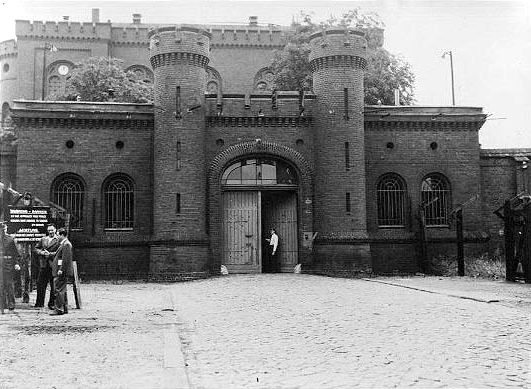
Spandau Prison in 1951

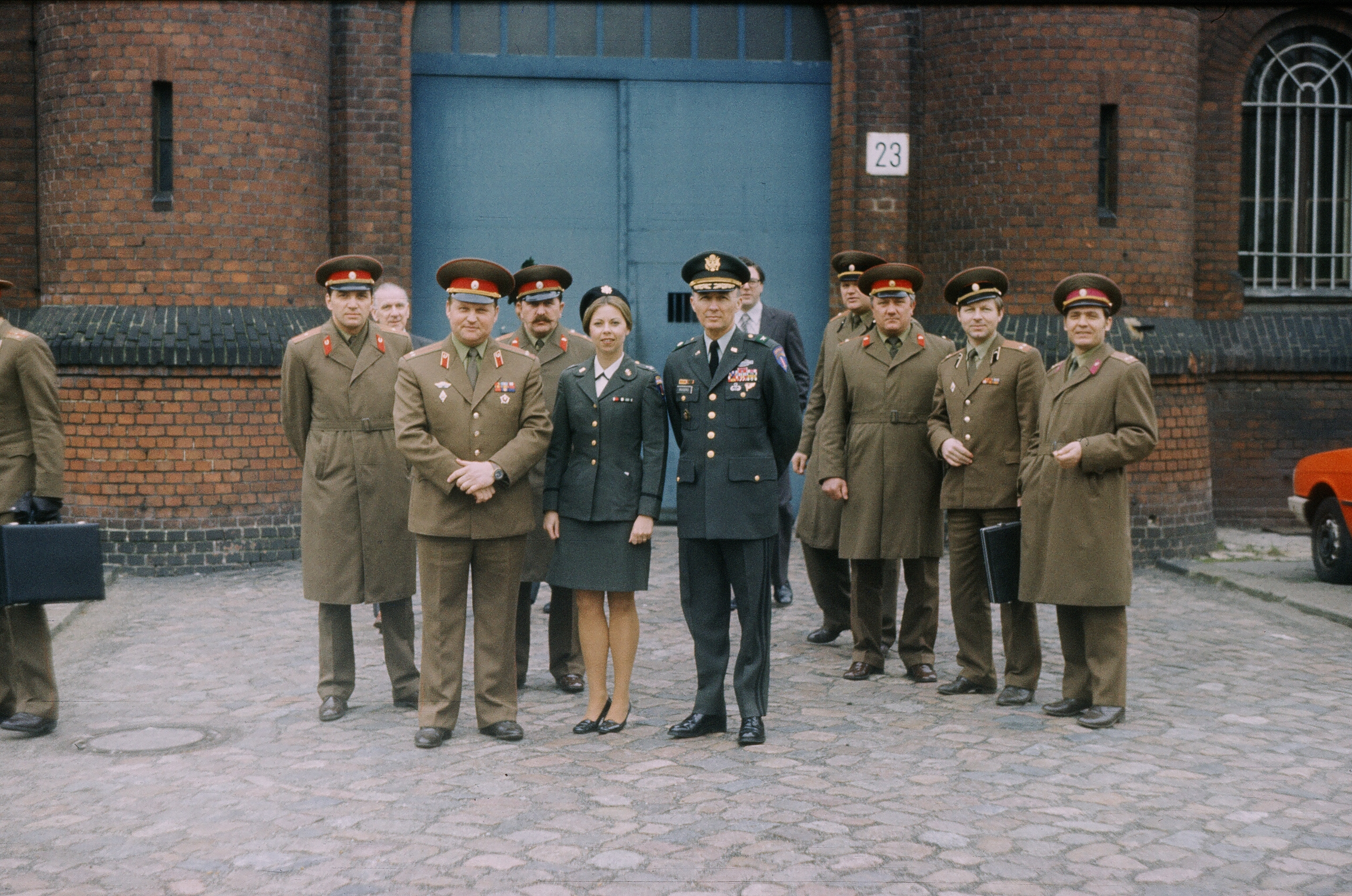
Lieutenant Colonel Alexander Dorofeev (Soviet Union), MG John E. Rogers (US), West Berlin, 1 April 1981

== History ==
Spandau Prison was built in 1876 on Wilhelmstraße. It initially served as a military detention centre for the Prussian Army. From 1919 it was also used for civilian inmates. It held up to 600 inmates at that time.

In the aftermath of the Reichstag fire of 1933, opponents of Adolf Hitler and journalists such as Egon Kisch and Carl von Ossietzky, were held there in so-called protective custody. Spandau Prison became a predecessor of sorts of the Nazi concentration camps. While it was formally operated by the Prussian Ministry of Justice, the Gestapo tortured and abused its inmates, as Kisch recalled in his memories of the prison. By the end of 1933, the first Nazi concentration camps had been erected (at Dachau, Osthofen, Oranienburg, Sonnenburg, Lichtenburg and the marshland camps around Esterwegen); all remaining prisoners who had been held in so-called protective custody in state prisons were transferred to these concentration camps.

After World War II, the prison fell in the British Sector of what became West Berlin, but it was operated by the Four-Power Authorities to house the Nazi war criminals sentenced to imprisonment at the Nuremberg trials.

Only seven prisoners were finally imprisoned there. Arriving from Nuremberg on 18 July 1947, they were:

Name	Sentence	Born	Released		Died	Age at death
Name	Sentence	Born	Date	Reason for early release	Died	Age at death
Baldur von Schirach	20 years	9 May 1907	30 September 1966	—	8 August 1974	67
Karl Dönitz	10 years	16 September 1891	30 September 1956	—	24 December 1980	89
Konstantin von Neurath	15 years	2 February 1873	6 November 1954	Ill health	14 August 1956	83
Erich Raeder	Life	24 April 1876	26 September 1955	Ill health	6 November 1960	84
Albert Speer	20 years	19 March 1905	1 October 1966	—	1 September 1981	76
Walther Funk	Life	18 August 1890	16 May 1957	Ill health	31 May 1960	69
Rudolf Hess	Life	26 April 1894	Never	Suicide by hanging	17 August 1987	93

Of the seven, three were released after serving their full sentences, while three others (including Raeder and Funk, who were given life sentences) were released earlier due to ill health. Between 1966 and 1987, Rudolf Hess was the only inmate in the prison, and his only companion was the warden, Eugene K. Bird, who became a close friend. Bird wrote a book about Hess's imprisonment titled The Loneliest Man in the World.

Spandau was one of only two Four-Power organisations to continue to operate after the breakdown of the Allied Control Council; the other was the Berlin Air Safety Centre. The four occupying powers of Berlin alternated control of the prison on a monthly basis, each having the responsibility for a total of three months out of the year. Observing the Four-Power flags that flew at the Allied Control Authority building could determine who controlled the prison.

Allied responsibility	Months		
United Kingdom	January	May	September
France	February	June	October
Soviet Union	March	July	November
United States	April	August	December

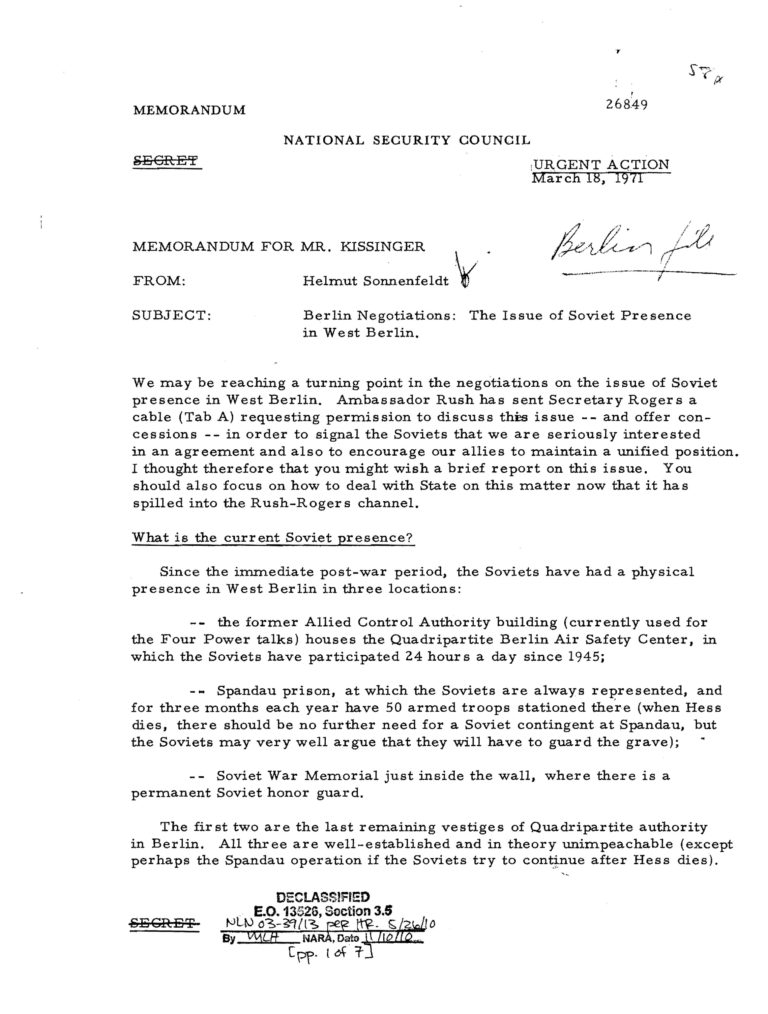
Report to the US National Security Advisor Mr. Kissinger on the situation with the Soviet presence in West Berlin, March 18, 1971.

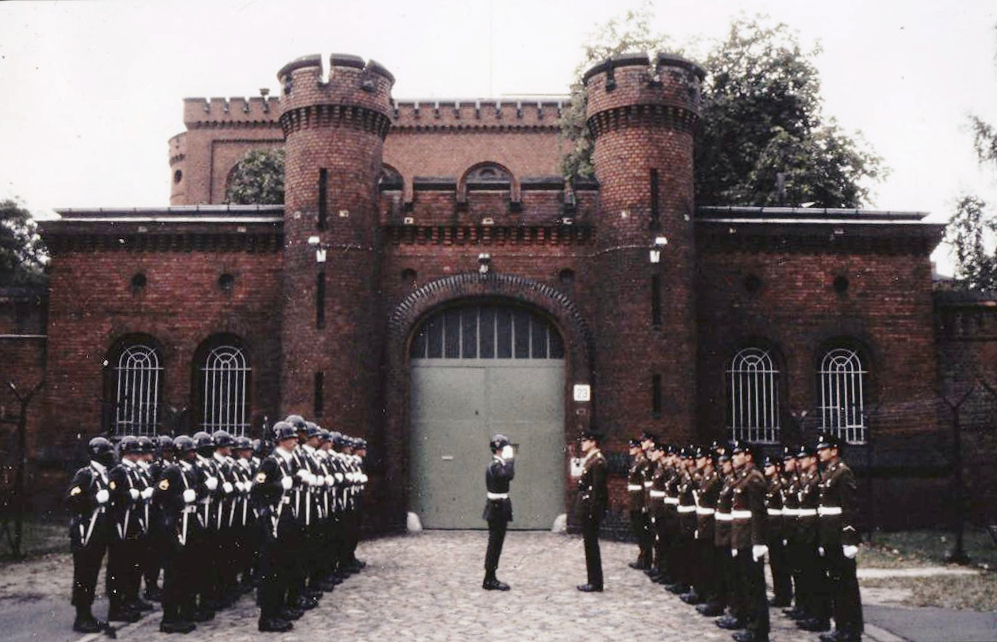
Changing the guard (US troops left and British right) at Spandau Prison

The prison was demolished in August 1987, largely to prevent it from becoming a neo-Nazi shrine, after Hess, its final remaining prisoner, committed suicide by hanging. To further ensure its erasure, the site was made into a parking facility and a shopping centre, named The Britannia Centre Spandau, nicknamed Hessco's after the well-known British supermarket chain Tesco. All materials from the demolished prison were ground to powder and dispersed in the North Sea, or buried at the former RAF Gatow airbase, with the exception of a single set of keys now exhibited in the regimental museum of the King's Own Scottish Borderers at Berwick Barracks.

== The prison ==
The prison, initially designed for a population in the hundreds, was an old brick building enclosed by one wall 4.5 m (15 ft) high, another of 9 m (30 ft), a 3 m (10 ft) high wall topped with electrified wire, followed by a wall of barbed wire. In addition, some of the sixty soldiers on guard duty manned six machine-gun armed guard towers 24 hours a day. Due to the number of cells available, an empty cell was left between the prisoners' cells, to avoid the possibility of prisoners' communicating in Morse code. Other remaining cells in the wing were designated for other purposes, with one used for the prison library and another for a chapel. The cells were approximately 3 m (9.8 ft) long by 2.7 m (8.9 ft) wide and 4 m (13 ft) high.

=== Garden ===
The highlight of the prison, from the inmates' perspective, was the garden. Very spacious given the small number of prisoners using it, the garden space was initially divided into small personal plots that were used by each prisoner in various ways, usually to grow vegetables. Dönitz favoured growing beans, Funk tomatoes and Speer daisies, although the Soviet director subsequently banned flowers for a time. By regulation, all of the produce was to be put toward use in the prison kitchen, but prisoners and guards alike often skirted this rule and indulged in the garden's offerings. As prison regulations slackened and as prisoners became either apathetic or too ill to maintain their plots, the garden was consolidated into one large workable area. This suited the former architect Speer, who, being one of the youngest and liveliest of the inmates, later took up the task of refashioning the entire plot of land into a large complex garden, complete with paths, rock gardens and floral displays. On days without access to the garden, for instance when it was raining, the prisoners occupied their time making envelopes together in the main corridor.

=== Underutilization ===
The Allied powers originally requisitioned the prison in November 1946, expecting it to accommodate a hundred or more war criminals. Besides the sixty or so soldiers on duty in or around the prison at any given time, there were teams of professional civilian warders from each of the four countries, four prison directors and their deputies, four army medical officers, cooks, translators, waiters, porters and others. This was perceived as a drastic misallocation of resources and became a serious point of contention among the prison directors, politicians from their respective countries, and especially the West Berlin government, who were left to foot the bill for Spandau yet suffered from a lack of space in their own prison system. The debate surrounding the imprisonment of seven war criminals in such a large space, with numerous and expensive complementary staff, was only heightened as time went on and prisoners were released.

Acrimony reached its peak after the release of Speer and Schirach in 1966, leaving only one inmate, Hess, remaining in an otherwise under-utilized prison. Various proposals were made to remedy this situation over the years, ranging from moving the prisoners to an appropriately sized wing of another larger, occupied prison, to releasing them; house arrest was also considered. Nevertheless, an official refraining order went into effect, forbidding the approaching of unsettled prisoners, and so the prison remained exclusively for the seven war criminals for the remainder of its existence.

== Life in the prison ==
=== Prison regulations ===
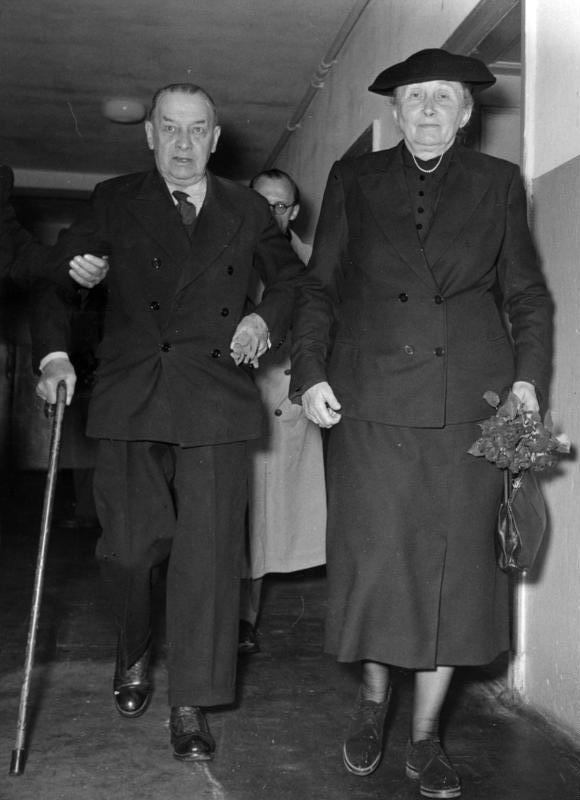
Erich Raeder released from Spandau Prison, 26 September 1955, with his wife at the Bürger-Hospital in Berlin-Charlottenburg

Every facet of life in the prison was strictly set out by an intricate prison regulation scheme designed before the prisoners' arrival by the Four Powers – France, Britain, the Soviet Union, and the United States. Compared with other established prison regulations at the time, Spandau's rules were quite strict. The prisoners' outgoing letters to families were at first limited to one page every month, talking with fellow prisoners was prohibited, newspapers were banned, diaries and memoirs were forbidden, visits by families were limited to fifteen minutes every two months, and lights were flashed into the prisoners' cells every fifteen minutes during the night as a form of suicide watch. A considerable portion of the stricter regulations was either later revised toward the more lenient, or deliberately ignored by prison staff.

The directors and guards of the Western powers (France, Britain, and the United States) repeatedly voiced opposition to many of the stricter measures and made near-constant protest about them to their superiors throughout the prison's existence, but they were invariably vetoed by the Soviet Union, which favored a tougher approach. The Soviet Union, which suffered between 10 and 19 million civilian deaths during the war and had pressed at the Nuremberg trials for the execution of all the current inmates, was unwilling to compromise with the Western powers in this regard, both because of the harsher punishment that they felt was justified, and to stress the Communist propaganda line that the capitalist powers had supposedly never been serious about denazification. This contrasted with Werl Prison, which housed hundreds of former officers and other lower-ranking Nazi men who were under a comparatively lax regime. However, a more contemporary consideration was that the continued incarceration of even one Nazi (i.e. Hess) in Spandau ensured a conduit that guaranteed the Soviets access to West Berlin would remain open, and Western commentators frequently accused the Russians of keeping Spandau prison in operation chiefly as a centre for Soviet espionage operations. It was one of the three places in west Berlin where Soviet troops were allowed. The other two were the Soviet Memorial in Tiergarten and the Berlin Air Safety Centre.

=== Daily life ===
Every day, prisoners were ordered to rise at 6 a.m., wash, clean their cells and the corridor together, eat breakfast, stay in the garden until lunch-time at noon (weather permitting), have a post-lunch rest in their cells, and then return to the garden. Dinner followed at 5 p.m., after which the prisoners returned to their cells. Lights out was at 10 p.m. Prisoners received a shave and a haircut, if necessary, on Mondays, Wednesdays, or Fridays; they did their own laundry every Monday. This routine, except the time allowed in the garden, changed very little throughout the years, although each of the controlling nations made their own interpretation of the prison regulations.

Within a few years of their arrival at the prison, all sorts of illicit lines of communication with the outside world were opened for the inmates by sympathetic staff. These supplementary lines were free of the censorship placed on authorised communications, and were also virtually unlimited in volume, ordinarily occurring on either Sundays or Thursdays (except during times of total lock-down of exchanges). Every piece of paper given to the prisoners was recorded and tracked, so secret notes were most often written by other means, where the supply went officially unmonitored for the entire duration of the prison's existence. Many inmates took full advantage of this. Albert Speer, after having his official request to write his memoirs denied, finally began setting down his experiences and perspectives of his time with the Nazi regime, which were smuggled out and later released as a bestselling book, Inside the Third Reich. Dönitz wrote letters to his former deputy regarding the protection of his prestige in the outside world. When his release was near, he gave instructions to his wife on how best she could help ease his transition back into politics, which he intended, but never actually accomplished. Walther Funk managed to obtain a seemingly constant supply of cognac (all alcohol was banned) and other treats that he would share with other prisoners on special occasions.

== The Spandau Seven ==
The prisoners, still subject to the petty personal rivalries and battles for prestige that characterized Nazi party politics, divided themselves into groups: Albert Speer and Rudolf Hess were the loners, generally disliked by the others – the former for his admission of guilt and repudiation of Hitler at the Nuremberg trials, the latter for his antisocial personality and perceived mental instability. The two former grand admirals, Erich Raeder and Karl Dönitz, stayed together, despite their heated mutual dislike. This situation had come about when Dönitz replaced Raeder as Commander in Chief of the German navy in 1943. Baldur von Schirach and Walther Funk were described as "inseparable". Konstantin von Neurath was, being a former diplomat, amiable and amenable to all the others.

Despite the length of time they spent with each other, remarkably little progress was made in the way of reconciliation. A notable example was Dönitz's dislike of Speer being steadfastly maintained for his entire 10-year sentence, with it only coming to a head during the last few days of his imprisonment. Dönitz always believed that Hitler had named him as his successor due to Speer's recommendation, which had led to Dönitz being tried at Nuremberg (Speer always denied this).

There has also survived a collection of medical reports concerning Baldur von Schirach, Albert Speer, and Rudolf Hess made during their confinement at Spandau.

=== Erich Raeder and Karl Dönitz ===
"The Admiralty", as the other prisoners referred to Dönitz and Raeder, were often teamed together for various tasks. Raeder, with a liking for rigid systems and organization, designated himself as chief librarian of the prison library, with Dönitz as his assistant. Each designed their own sleeve insignia for both chief librarian (a silver book) and assistant chief librarian (a gold book) which were woven with the appropriate colored thread. Both men often withheld themselves from the other prisoners, with Dönitz claiming for his entire ten years in prison that he was still the rightful head of the German state (he also got one vote in the 1954 West German presidential election), and Raeder having contempt for the insolence and lack of discipline endemic in his nonmilitary fellow prisoners. Despite preferring to stay together, the two of them continued their wartime feud and argued most of the time over whether Raeder's battleships or Dönitz's U-boats were responsible for losing the war. This feud often resulted in fist fights. After Dönitz's release in 1956, he wrote two books, one on his early life, My Ever-Changing Life, and one on his time as an admiral, Ten Years and Twenty Days. Raeder, in failing health and seemingly close to death, was released in 1955 and died in 1960.

=== Rudolf Hess ===
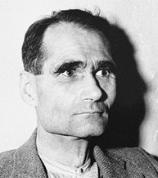
Rudolf Hess, seen here in prison in Nuremberg in 1945, was the last inmate of Spandau Prison

Rudolf Hess, sentenced to life but not released due to ill health (as were Raeder, Funk, or Neurath), served the longest sentence out of the seven and was by far the most demanding of the prisoners. Regarded as being the "laziest man in Spandau", Hess avoided all forms of work that he deemed below his dignity, such as pulling weeds. He was the only one of the seven who almost never attended the prison's Sunday church service. A paranoid hypochondriac, he repeatedly complained of all forms of illness, mostly stomach pains, and was suspicious of all food given to him, always taking the dish placed farthest away from him as a means of avoiding being poisoned. His alleged stomach pains often caused wild and excessive moans and cries of pain throughout the day and night, and their authenticity was repeatedly the subject of debate between the prisoners and the prison directors.

Raeder, Dönitz, and Schirach were contemptuous of this behaviour, and viewed it as cries for attention or as a means to avoid work. Speer and Funk, acutely aware of the likely psychosomatic nature of the illness, were more accommodating to Hess. Speer, in a move that invoked the ire of his fellow prisoners, would often tend to Hess's needs, bringing him his coat when he was cold and coming to his defence when a director or guard was attempting to coax Hess out of bed and into work. Hess occasionally wailed in pain at night, affecting the sleep of the other prisoners. The prison's medical officer would inject Hess with what was described as a "sedative", but was in reality distilled water, and succeeded in putting Hess to sleep. The fact that Hess repeatedly shirked duties the others had to bear and received other preferential treatment because of his illness irked the other prisoners, and earned him the title of "His imprisoned Lordship" by the admirals, who often mocked him and played mean-spirited pranks on him.

Hess was also unique among the prisoners in that, as a matter of dignity, he refused all visitors for more than twenty years, finally consenting to see his adult son and wife in 1969 after suffering from a perforated ulcer that required treatment at a hospital outside the prison. Fearing for his mental health now that he was the sole remaining inmate, and assuming that his death was imminent, the prison directors agreed to slacken most of the remaining regulations, moving Hess to the more spacious former chapel space, giving him a water heater to allow the making of tea or coffee when he liked, and permanently unlocking his cell so that he could freely access the prison's bathing facilities and library.

Hess was frequently moved from room to room every night for security reasons. He was often taken to the British Military Hospital not far from the prison, where the entire second floor of the hospital was cordoned off for him. He remained under heavy guard while in hospital. Ward security was provided by soldiers including Royal Military Police Close Protection personnel. External security was provided by one of the British infantry battalions then stationed in Berlin. On some unusual occasions, the Soviets relaxed their strict regulations; during these times, Hess was allowed to spend extra time in the prison garden, and one of the wardens from the superpowers took Hess outside the prison walls for a stroll, and sometimes dinner, at a nearby Berlin restaurant, in a private room.

== In popular culture ==
The British band Spandau Ballet got their name after a friend of the band, journalist and DJ Robert Elms, saw the words 'Spandau Ballet' scrawled on the wall of a nightclub lavatory during a visit to Berlin. The graffiti referred to the way a condemned individual would twitch and "dance" at the end of the rope due to the standard drop method of hangings used at Spandau Prison and was in the tradition of similar gallows humour expressions such as "dancing the Tyburn jig".

The prison featured in the film Wild Geese II (1985), about a fictional group of mercenaries who are assigned to kidnap Rudolf Hess (played by Laurence Olivier), and in the book Spandau Phoenix (1993) by Greg Iles, which is a fictional account of Hess and Spandau Prison.

The prison and its last prisoner are mentioned in the song The Day the Nazi Died (1994) by British rock band Chumbawamba, which is featured as one of the B sides of their single Homophobia (1994).

== See also ==
- Land of the Blind
- Cold War
- Landsberg Prison in Bavaria
- Spandau Citadel
- Sugamo Prison in Tokyo, Japan
- Speer und Er (Extensive footage of the prison recreated in a studio)
