= Wolf Hess (philatelist) =

German philatelist

Dr. Wolf Hess (1945 - 2022) was a German philatelist who signed the Roll of Distinguished Philatelists in 2010. He was a Fellow of the Royal Philatelic Society London (RPSL); his exhibit "Finland Postal History" won the Grand Prix in Sofia in 2009. "He was elected to the Roll of Distinguished Philatelists in 2010 and in 2020 became a member of the Consilium Philatelicum." Dr. Hess was a retired vascular and trauma surgeon by profession and resided in Ratingen, Germany.
