= Rudolf Hess =

German Nazi politician (1894–1987)

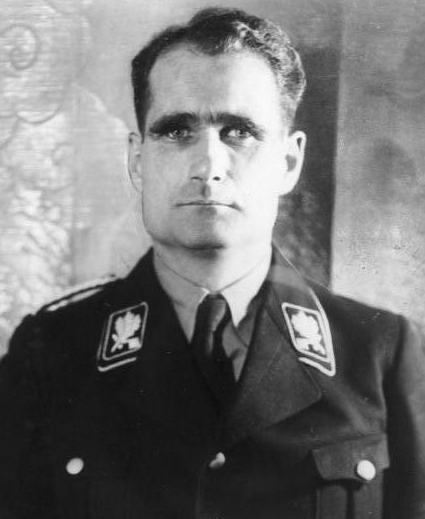
- Hess in 1935

Deputy Führer of the German Nazi Party
- In office 21 April 1933 – 12 May 1941
- Führer: Adolf Hitler
- Preceded by: Office established
- Succeeded by: Martin Bormann (Chief of the Party Chancellery)

Reichsminister without portfolio
- In office 1 December 1933 – 12 May 1941
- President: Paul von Hindenburg
- Chancellor: Adolf Hitler

Chief of the Nazi Party Liaison Office
- In office 20 March 1933 – 12 May 1941
- Preceded by: Office established
- Succeeded by: Martin Bormann

Private Secretary to the Führer of the Nazi Party
- In office 1925–1935
- Preceded by: Office established
- Succeeded by: Martin Bormann

Additional positions
- 1939–1941: Member of the Council of Ministers for the Defence of the Reich
- June–September 1933: Reichsleiter of the Nazi Party
- 1933–1941: Member of the Greater German Reichstag
- 1932–1941: Chairman of the Nazi Party's Central Political Committee

Personal details
- Born: Rudolf Walter Richard Hess; 26 April 1894 Alexandria, Khedivate of Egypt
- Died: 17 August 1987 (aged 93) Spandau Prison, West Berlin, West Germany
- Cause of death: Suicide by hanging
- Resting place: Friedhof Wunsiedel, Wunsiedel, Germany
- Party: Nazi Party (1920–1941)
- Spouse: Ilse Pröhl (m. 1927)
- Children: Wolf Rüdiger Hess
- Education: École supérieure de commerce, Neuchâtel; LMU Munich

Military service
- Allegiance: German Empire
- Branch/service: Imperial German Army
- Years of service: 1914–1918
- Rank: Leutnant der Reserve
- Unit: 7th Bavarian Field Artillery Regiment; 1st Infantry Regiment
- Battles/wars: World War I; First Battle of Ypres; Battle of Verdun; Romanian Front
- Awards: Iron Cross, 2nd Class
- Criminal information
- Status: Deceased
- Convictions: Conspiracy to commit crimes against peace Crimes of aggression
- Trial: Nuremberg trials
- Penalty: Life imprisonment

Rudolf Walter Richard Hess (Heß in German; 26 April 1894 – 17 August 1987) was a German politician, a leading member of the Nazi Party in Germany, and a convicted criminal of World War II. Appointed Deputy to the Führer (Stellvertreter des Führers) in 1933, Hess held that position until 1941, when he flew solo to Scotland in an attempt to negotiate the United Kingdom's exit from the Second World War. He was taken prisoner and eventually convicted of crimes against peace and conspiracy. He was still serving his life sentence at age 93 when he committed suicide in 1987.

Hess enlisted as an infantryman in the Imperial German Army at the outbreak of World War I. He was wounded several times during the war and was awarded the Iron Cross, 2nd Class, in 1915. Shortly before the war ended, he enrolled to train as an aviator, but he saw no action in that role. He left the armed forces in December 1918 with the rank of Leutnant der Reserve. In 1919, he enrolled at the Ludwig-Maximilians-Universität München (LMU), where he studied geopolitics under Karl Haushofer, a proponent of the concept of Lebensraum ('living space'), which became one of the pillars of Nazi ideology. He joined the Nazi Party on 1 July 1920 and was at Hitler's side on 8 November 1923 for the Beer Hall Putsch, a failed Nazi attempt to seize control of the government of Bavaria. While serving a prison sentence for this attempted coup, he assisted Hitler with Mein Kampf, which became a foundation of the political platform of the Nazi Party.

After Hitler became Chancellor in January 1933, Hess was appointed Deputy Führer of the Nazi Party in April of the same year. He was elected to the Reichstag in the March elections, was made a Reichsleiter of the Nazi Party in June, and in December 1933, he became Minister without Portfolio in Hitler's cabinet. In addition to appearing on Hitler's behalf at speaking engagements and rallies, Hess signed into law much of the government's legislation, including the 1935 Nuremberg Laws, which stripped the Jews of Germany of their rights in the lead-up to the Holocaust. Hess was also appointed in 1938 to the Secret Cabinet Council and to the Council of Ministers for the Defence of the Reich in August 1939. Hitler decreed on the outbreak of war on 1 September 1939 that Hermann Göring was his official successor, and named Hess as next in line.

By the start of the war, Hess was sidelined from most important decisions, and many in Hitler's inner circle thought him to be mad. On 10 May 1941, Hess made a solo flight to Scotland, where he hoped to arrange peace talks with the Duke of Hamilton, whom he believed to be a prominent opponent of the British government's war policy. The British authorities arrested Hess immediately on his arrival and held him in custody until the end of the war, when he was returned to Germany to stand trial at the 1946 Nuremberg trials of major war criminals. During much of his trial, he claimed to be suffering from amnesia, but he later admitted to the tribunal that this had been a ruse. The tribunal convicted him of crimes against peace and of conspiracy with other German leaders to commit crimes. He served a life sentence in Spandau Prison; the Soviet Union blocked repeated attempts by family members and prominent politicians to procure his early release. While still in custody as the only prisoner in Spandau, he hanged himself in 1987 at the age of 93.

After his death, the prison was demolished to prevent it from becoming a neo-Nazi shrine. His grave, bearing the inscription "Ich habs gewagt" ("I dared to do it"), became a site of regular pilgrimage and demonstrations by neo-Nazis. In 2011, authorities refused to renew the lease on the gravesite, so his remains were exhumed and cremated, and the gravestone was destroyed.

== Early life and family ==
Hess, the eldest of three children, was born on 26 April 1894 in al-Ibrahimiyya, a suburb of Alexandria, in the British-controlled Khedivate of Egypt (a nominal vassal of the Ottoman Empire), into a wealthy German family. Originally from Bohemia, the family settled in Wunsiedel, Upper Franconia, in the 1760s. His grandfather, Johann Christian Hess, married Margaretha Bühler, the daughter of a Swiss consul, in 1861 in Trieste. After the birth of his father, Johann Fritz Hess, the family moved to Alexandria, where Johann Christian Hess founded the import company Hess & Co. which his son, Johann Fritz Hess, took over in 1888. Hess's mother, Klara, was the daughter of Rudolf Münch, a textile industrialist and councillor of commerce from Hof, Upper Franconia. His brother, Alfred, was born in 1897 and his sister, Margarete, was born in 1908. The family lived in a villa on the Egyptian coast near Alexandria, and visited Germany often from 1900, staying at their summer home in Reicholdsgrün (now part of Kirchenlamitz) in the Fichtel Mountains.

Hess's youth in Egypt left him with a strong admiration for the British Empire. His youth growing up under the "Veiled Protectorate" of Sir Evelyn Baring made him unique among the Nazi leaders in that he grew up under British rule, which he saw in very positive terms.

Hess attended a German-language Protestant school in Alexandria from 1900 to 1908, when he was sent back to Germany to study at a boarding school in Bad Godesberg. He demonstrated aptitudes for science and mathematics, but his father wished him to join the family business, Hess & Co., so he sent Hess in 1911 to study at the École supérieure de commerce in Neuchâtel, Switzerland. After a year there, he took an apprenticeship at a trading company in Hamburg.

== World War I ==
Within weeks of the outbreak of World War I, Hess enlisted in the 7th Bavarian Field Artillery Regiment, part of the 1st Royal Bavarian Division. His initial posting was against the British on the Somme. He was present at the First Battle of Ypres. On 9 November 1914, he transferred to the 1st Infantry Regiment, stationed near Arras. He was awarded the Iron Cross, second class, and promoted to Gefreiter (corporal) in April 1915. After additional training at the Munster Training Area, he was promoted to Vizefeldwebel (senior non-commissioned officer) and received the Bavarian Military Merit Cross. Returning to the front lines in November, Hess fought in Artois, participating in the battle for the town of Neuville-Saint-Vaast. After two months out of action with a throat infection, he served in the Battle of Verdun in May, and was hit by shrapnel in the left hand and arm on 12 June 1916 while fighting near the village of Thiaumont. After a month off to recover, he was sent back to the Verdun area, where he remained until December.

Hess was promoted to platoon leader of the 10th Company of the 18th Bavarian Reserve Infantry Regiment, which was serving in Romania. He was wounded on 23 July and again on 8 August 1917; the first injury was a shell splinter to the left arm, which was dressed in the field, but the second was a bullet wound that entered the upper chest near the armpit and exited near his spinal column, leaving a pea-sized entry wound and a cherry stone-sized exit wound on his back.

By 20 August, Hess was well enough to travel; he was thus sent to a hospital in Hungary and eventually back to Germany, where he recovered in hospital in Meissen. In October, he was promoted to Leutnant der Reserve and was recommended for, but did not receive, the Iron Cross, first class. At his father's request, Hess was transferred to a hospital closer to home, arriving at Alexandersbad on 25 October.

While still convalescing, Hess had requested that he be allowed to enrol to train as a pilot, so after Christmas leave with his family, he reported to Munich. He received basic flight training at Oberschleissheim and Lechfeld Air Base from March to June 1918, and advanced training at Valenciennes in occupied France in October. On 14 October, he was assigned to Jagdstaffel 35b, a Bavarian fighter squadron equipped with Fokker D.VII biplanes. He saw no action with Jagdstaffel 35b, as the war ended on 11 November 1918, before he had the opportunity.

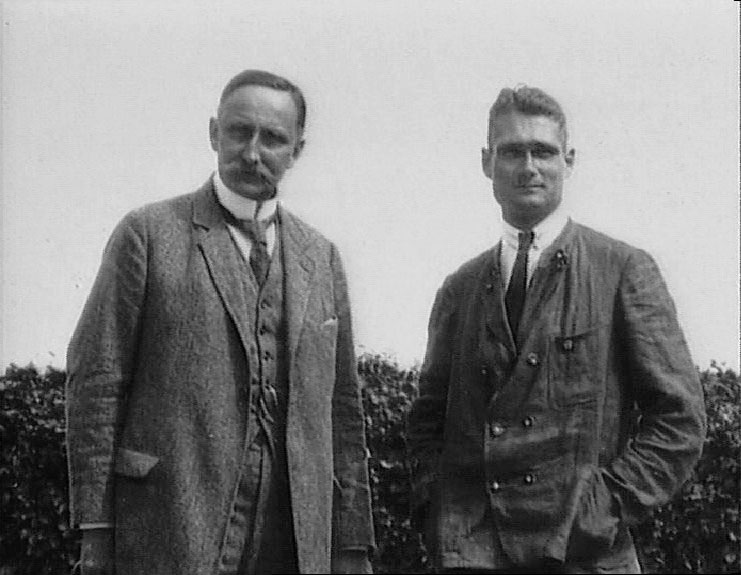
Hess (right) with his geopolitics professor, Karl Haushofer, c. 1920

Hess was discharged from the armed forces in December 1918. The family fortunes had taken a serious downturn, as their business interests in Egypt had been expropriated by the British. He joined the Thule Society, an antisemitic right-wing Völkisch group, and the Freikorps of Colonel Ritter von Epp, one of many such volunteer paramilitary organisations active in Germany at the time.

Bavaria witnessed frequent and often bloody conflicts between right-wing groups, the Freikorps, and left-wing forces as they fought for control of the state during this period. Hess was a participant in street battles in early 1919 and led a group that distributed thousands of antisemitic pamphlets in Munich. He later said that Egypt made him a nationalist, the war made him a socialist, and Munich made him an antisemite.

In 1919, Hess enrolled at the Ludwig-Maximilians-Universität München (LMU), where he studied history and economics. His geopolitics professor was Karl Haushofer, a former general in the German Army who was a proponent of the concept of Lebensraum ("living space"), which Haushofer cited to justify the proposal that Germany should forcefully conquer additional territory in Eastern Europe. He later introduced this concept to Adolf Hitler, and it became one of the pillars of Nazi Party ideology. Hess became friends with Haushofer and his son Albrecht, a social theorist and lecturer.

Ilse Pröhl, a fellow student at the university, met Hess in April 1920 when by chance they rented rooms in the same boarding house. They married on 20 December 1927 and their only child, Wolf Rüdiger Hess, was born 10 years later, on 18 November 1937. His name was, at least in part, to honour Hitler, who often used "Wolf" as a code name. Hess nicknamed the boy "Buz".

== Relationship with Hitler ==
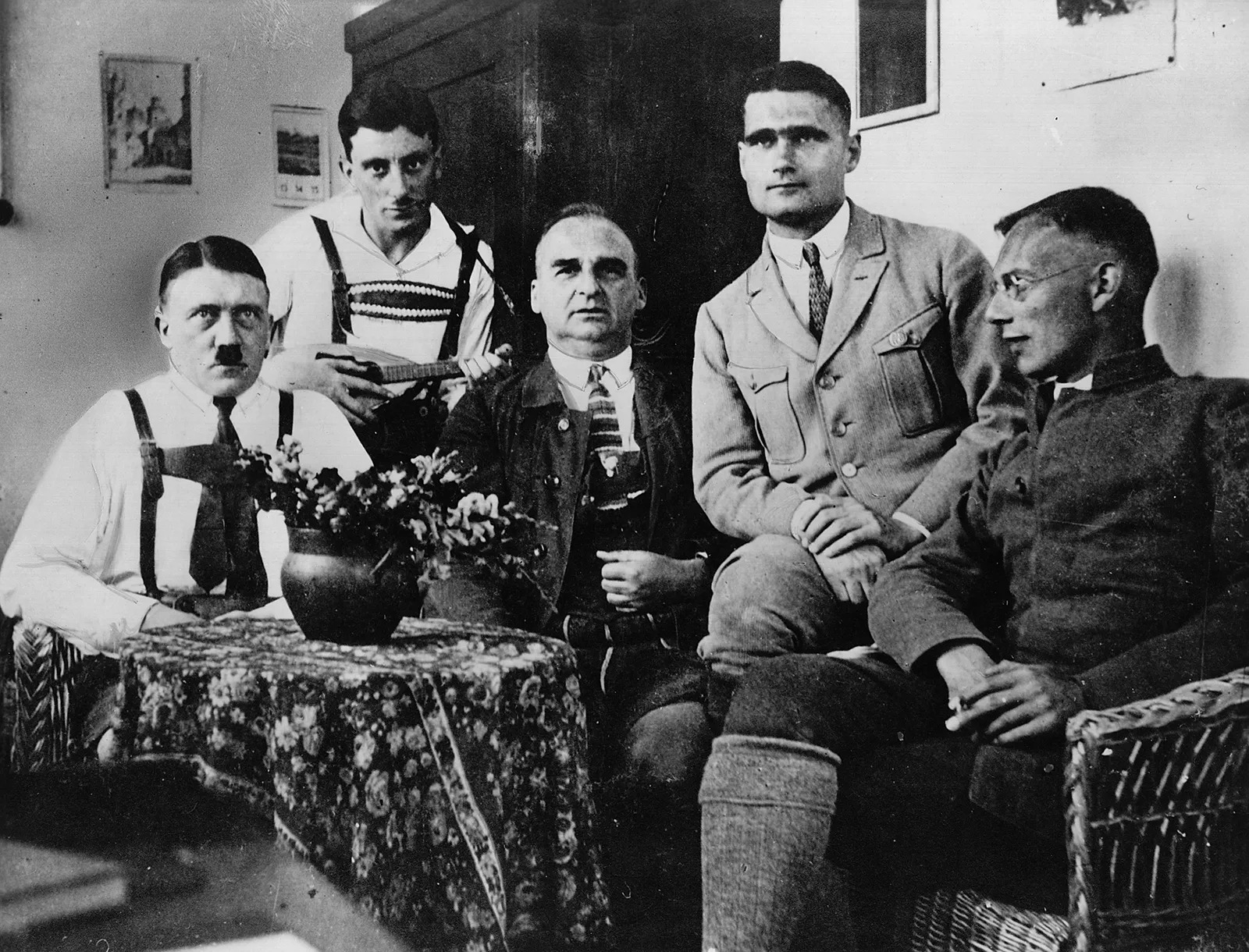
Hitler, Emil Maurice, Hermann Kriebel, Hess, and Friedrich Weber at Landsberg Prison in 1924

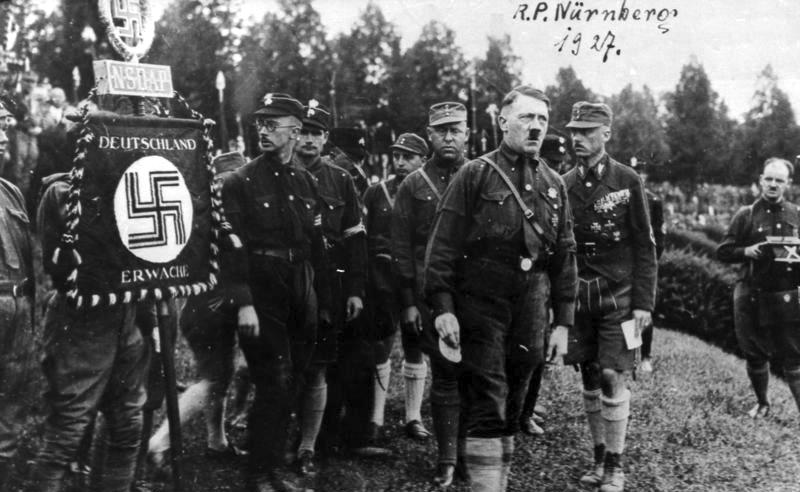
Hess (2nd from left, behind Heinrich Himmler) was an early supporter of the Nazi Party.

After hearing the Nazi Party leader Hitler speak for the first time in 1920 at a Munich rally, Hess became completely devoted to him. They held a shared belief in the stab-in-the-back myth, the notion that Germany's loss in World War I was caused by a conspiracy of Jews and Bolsheviks rather than a military defeat. He joined the Nazi Party on 1 July as member number 16. As the party continued to grow, holding rallies and meetings in ever larger beer halls in Munich, he focused his attention on fundraising and organisational activities. On 4 November 1921, he was injured while protecting Hitler when a bomb planted by a Marxist group exploded at the Hofbräuhaus during a party event. Hess joined the Sturmabteilung (SA) by 1922 and helped organise and recruit its early membership.

Meanwhile, problems continued with the economy; hyperinflation rendered many personal fortunes worthless. When the German government failed to meet its reparations payments and French troops marched in to occupy the industrial areas along the Ruhr in January 1923, widespread civil unrest was the result. Hitler decided the time was ripe to attempt to seize control of the government with a coup d'état modelled on Benito Mussolini's 1922 March on Rome. Hess was with Hitler on the night of 8 November 1923 when he and the SA stormed a public meeting organised by Bavaria's de facto ruler, Staatskommissar (state commissioner) Gustav von Kahr, in the Bürgerbräukeller, a large beer hall in Munich. Brandishing a pistol, Hitler interrupted Kahr's speech and announced that the national revolution had begun, declaring the formation of a new government with World War I General Erich Ludendorff. The next day, Hitler and several thousand supporters attempted to march to the Ministry of War in the city centre. Gunfire broke out between the Nazis and the police; sixteen marchers and four police officers were killed. Hitler was arrested on 11 November.

Hess and some SA men had taken a few of the dignitaries hostage on the night of the 8th, driving them to a house about 50 kilometres (31 mi) from Munich. When Hess left briefly to make a phone call the next day, the hostages convinced the driver to help them escape. Hess, stranded, called Ilse Pröhl, who brought him a bicycle so he could return to Munich. He went to stay with the Haushofers and then fled to Austria, but they convinced him to return. He was arrested and sentenced to 18 months of Festungshaft (fortress confinement) for his role in the attempted coup, which later became known as the Beer Hall Putsch. Hitler was sentenced to five years of fortress confinement, and the Nazi Party and SA were both outlawed.

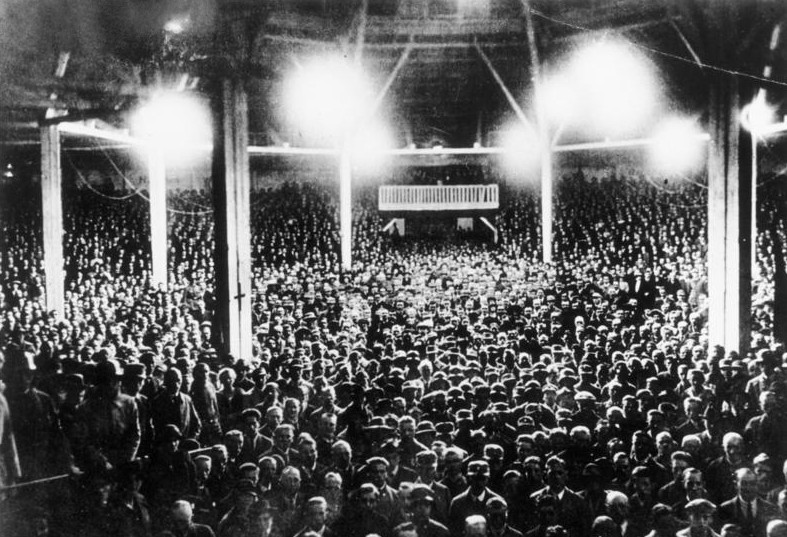
Hitler speaking at a party rally in Munich in 1925

Both men were incarcerated in Landsberg Prison, where Hitler soon began work on his memoir, Mein Kampf ("My Struggle"), which he dictated to fellow prisoners Hess and Emil Maurice. Edited by publisher Max Amann, Hess and others, the work was published in two parts in 1925 and 1926. It was later released in a single volume, which became a best-seller after 1930. This book, with its message of violent antisemitism, became the foundation of the political platform of the Nazi Party.

Hitler was released on parole on 20 December 1924 and Hess was released ten days later. The ban on the Nazi Party and SA was lifted in February 1925, and the party grew to 100,000 members in 1928 and 150,000 in 1929. They received only 2.6 per cent of the vote in the 1928 election, but support increased steadily up until the seizure of power in 1933.

Hitler named Hess his private secretary in April 1925 at a salary of 500 Reichsmarks per month, and named him as personal adjutant on 20 July 1929. Hess accompanied Hitler to speaking engagements around the country and became his friend and confidante. Hess was one of the few people who could meet with Hitler at any time without an appointment. His influence in the Party continued to grow. On 15 December 1932, Hess was named head of the Party Liaison Staff and Chairman of the Party Central Political Commission.

Retaining his interest in flying after the end of his active military career, Hess obtained his private pilot's licence on 4 April 1929. His instructor was World War I flying ace Theodor Croneiss. In 1930, Hess became the owner of a BFW M.23b monoplane sponsored by the party newspaper, the Völkischer Beobachter. He acquired two more Messerschmitt aircraft in the early 1930s, logging many flying hours and becoming proficient in the operation of light single-engine aircraft.

== Deputy Führer ==
Vehicle standard for Hess while serving as Deputy Führer

On 30 January 1933, Hitler was appointed Reich Chancellor, his first step in gaining dictatorial control of Germany. Hess was named Deputy Führer (Stellvertreter des Führers) of the Nazi Party on 21 April. On 2 June 1933, he was made one of 16 Reichsleiters in the Party hierarchy. On 1 July, Hess was raised to the rank of Obergruppenführer in the Schutzstaffel (SS). However, by 20 September, Hitler decreed that he stop using the titles of Reichsleiter and Obergruppenführer, and use only the title of "Deputy Führer". This was an acknowledgement of his primus inter pares status in the Party.

Hess was appointed to the cabinet as a Reichsminister without portfolio on 1 December. With offices in the Brown House in Munich and another in Berlin, Hess was responsible for several departments, including foreign affairs, finance, health, education and law. Hess also was named as a member of Hans Frank's Academy for German Law. All legislation passed through his office for approval, except that concerning the army, the police and foreign policy, and he wrote and co-signed many of Hitler's decrees.

An organiser of the annual Nuremberg Rallies, Hess usually gave the opening speech and introduced Hitler. He spoke over the radio and at rallies around the country so frequently that his speeches were collected into book form in 1938. Hess also acted as Hitler's delegate in negotiations with industrialists and members of the wealthier classes.

As Hess had been born abroad, Hitler had him oversee the Nazi Party groups such as the NSDAP/AO that were in charge of party members living in other countries. In this capacity, he reviewed all court decisions related to persons deemed enemies of the Party. While doing so, he was authorised to increase the sentences of anyone he felt got off too lightly in these cases, and was also empowered to take "merciless action" if he saw fit to do so. This often entailed sending the person to a concentration camp or simply ordering the person killed.

In 1933, Hess founded the Volksdeutscher Rat (Council of Ethnic Germans) to handle the Nazi Party's relations with ethnic German minorities around the world, with a particular focus on Eastern Europe. The purpose of the council was to protect the Nazi Party from criticism that it was attempting to extend the process of Gleichschaltung to international ethnic German communities. Despite Hess's claims to the contrary, the council members were primarily loyal to Germany rather than their current nations. The eight council members, only one of whom was a member of the Nazi Party, were responsible only to Hess. All had long been known to either Hess or Haushofer, who was also involved with the council. Members publicly claimed to be uninvolved in the council, which Hess used as proof that the Nazi Party was not trying to interfere in the domestic affairs of other nations. As the council had considerable funds and appeared to be sufficiently independent of the German government to satisfy foreign governments, its activities had some impact on international German communities in the 1930s. Its most notable impact was in the Sudetenland, where in 1933 it promoted Konrad Henlein as the politician with the best hope of building a Nazi-friendly party that would win mass support without being banned by the Czechoslovak government.

The Nazi regime began to persecute Jews soon after the seizure of power. Hess's office was partly responsible for drafting Hitler's Nuremberg Laws of 1935. These laws had far-reaching implications for the Jews of Germany, banning marriage between non-Jewish and Jewish Germans and depriving non-Aryans of their German citizenship. Hess's friend Karl Haushofer and his family were subject to these laws, as Haushofer had married a half-Jewish woman, so Hess issued documents exempting them from this legislation.

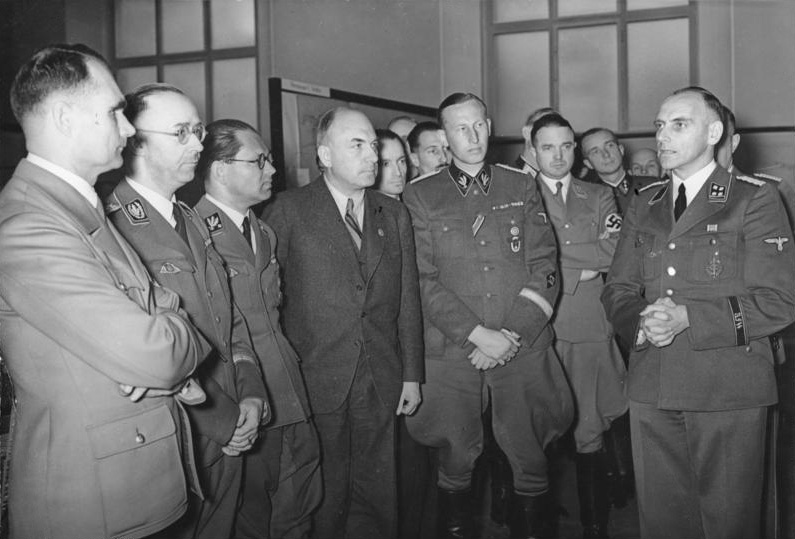
Hess, Heinrich Himmler, Phillip Bouhler, Fritz Todt, Reinhard Heydrich, and others listening to Konrad Meyer at a Generalplan Ost exhibition, 20 March 1941

Hess did not build a power base or develop a coterie of followers. He was motivated by his loyalty to Hitler and a desire to be useful to him; he did not seek power or prestige or take advantage of his position to accumulate personal wealth. He lived in a modest house in Munich. Hess was devoted to the völkisch ideology and viewed many issues in terms of an alleged Jewish conspiracy against Germany. For example, he said in a speech that "Today's League of Nations is really only a farce which functions primarily as the basis for the Jews to reach their own aims. You need only to note how many Jews sit in the League." In a speech in 1937, Hess blamed the Spanish Civil War on "international Jewry", called the Soviet Foreign Commissar Maxim Litvinov a "dirty Jew", and claimed that without Hitler or Mussolini, "Jewish Asiatic Bolshevism would dominate European culture".

On 30 August 1939, immediately prior to the outbreak of the Second World War, Hess was appointed by Hitler to the six-person Council of Ministers for Defence of the Reich, which was set up to operate as a war cabinet. After the invasion of Poland and the start of the war on 1 September, Hitler made Hess second in line to succeed him, after Hermann Göring. Around the same time, Hitler appointed Hess's chief of staff, Martin Bormann, as his personal secretary, a post formerly held by Hess. On 8 October, Hess co-signed the law that annexed the Free City of Danzig, the Polish Corridor, and the part of Upper Silesia lost in 1921 to Germany. That same day, Hess and Heinrich Himmler ordered that a racial registry be established in these areas and stated that Poles and Jews living in these areas were not to be treated as equals of Germans. A separate legal code for Poles and Jews in the annexed areas was created, imposing draconian punishments. Hess argued that a separate legal code was necessary because "the Pole is less susceptible to the infliction of ordinary punishment". In another decree, Hess ordered that none of the buildings destroyed in Warsaw during the siege were to be rebuilt as a reminder to the Poles of their "war guilt".

Hess's antisemitism markedly increased after the war started, as he was convinced that the war had been caused by Jews. This became a major theme of his wartime speeches. In a speech given on 20 April 1940 to mark Hitler's 51st birthday, Hess accused "Jews and their fellow travellers" of Germany's capitulation in November 1918, which he called the most calamitous event in world history. In that same speech, Hess, referring to the Black Horror on the Rhine story, stated the defeat of 1918 was followed by an occupation of the Rhineland by "Negroes and Indians", which he again blamed on the Jews. Hess concluded his speech by saying that with Hitler in charge, there was no possibility of the current war ending similarly. "How the Jewish hounds will howl when Adolf Hitler stands before them," he concluded.

Hess was obsessed with his health to the point of hypochondria, consulting many doctors and other practitioners for what he described to his captors in Britain as a long list of ailments involving the kidneys, colon, gall bladder, bowels and heart. At that time Hess was a vegetarian, and he did not smoke or drink. He brought his own food to the Berghof, claiming it was biologically dynamic, but Hitler did not approve of this practice, so he discontinued taking meals with the Führer.

Hess was interested in music, enjoyed reading and loved to spend time hiking and climbing in the mountains with his wife, Ilse. He and his friend Albrecht Haushofer shared an interest in astrology, and Hess also was keen on clairvoyance and the occult. Hess continued to be interested in aviation. He won an air race in 1934, flying a BFW M.35 in a circuit around Zugspitze Mountain and returning to the airfield at Munich with a time of 29 minutes. Hess placed sixth of 29 participants in a similar race held the following year. With the outbreak of World War II, Hess asked Hitler to be allowed to join the Luftwaffe as a pilot, but Hitler forbade it, and ordered him to stop flying for the duration of the war. Hess convinced him to reduce the ban to one year.

== Attempted peace mission ==
As the war progressed, Hitler's attention became focused on foreign affairs and the conduct of the war. Hess, whose duties did not require him to be directly engaged in the war, became increasingly sidelined from the affairs of the nation and from Hitler's attention. He was excluded from most important decisions, and many in Hitler's inner circle thought him to be mad due to his eccentricities. Bormann had successfully supplanted Hess in many of his duties and had taken Hess's position at Hitler's side. Hess was concerned that Germany would face a war on two fronts as plans progressed for Operation Barbarossa, the invasion of the Soviet Union scheduled to take place in 1941. Hess decided to attempt to bring Britain to the negotiating table by travelling there himself to seek meetings with the British government.

On 31 August 1940, Hess met Karl Haushofer, who told Hess that he believed that King George VI was opposed to Churchill and would dismiss him and send him to Canada at the first opportunity. Haushofer spoke of his belief that it was possible to make contact with the king via either General Ian Hamilton or the Duke of Hamilton. Hess decided they should contact his fellow aviator the Duke of Hamilton. The two men were not acquainted with each other: Hamilton and Hess were both present at a banquet at the 1936 Summer Olympics, but they sat at different tables and never spoke. Hess chose Hamilton in the mistaken belief that he was one of the leaders of a party opposed to war with Germany, and because Hamilton was a friend of Haushofer. On Hess's instructions, Haushofer wrote to Hamilton in September 1940, but the letter was intercepted by MI5 and Hamilton did not see it until March 1941.

A letter Hess wrote to his wife dated 4 November 1940 shows that despite not receiving a reply from Hamilton, he intended to proceed with his plan. Hess began training on the Messerschmitt Bf 110, a two-seater twin-engine aircraft, in October 1940 under instructor Wilhelm Stör, the chief test pilot at Messerschmitt. He continued to practise, as well as log his many cross-country flights, and found a specific aircraft which handled well—a Bf 110E-1/N—which was from then on held in reserve for his personal use. He asked for a radio compass, modifications to the oxygen delivery system, and large long-range fuel tanks to be installed on this plane, and these requests were granted by March 1941.

=== Flight to Scotland ===
After a final check of the weather reports for Germany and the North Sea, Hess took off at 17:45 on 10 May 1941 from the airfield at Augsburg-Haunstetten in his specially prepared aircraft. It was the last of several attempts to depart on his mission; previous efforts had to be called off due to mechanical problems or poor weather. Wearing a leather flying suit bearing the rank of captain, he brought along a supply of money and toiletries, a torch, a camera, maps and charts, and a collection of 28 different medicines, as well as dextrose tablets to help ward off fatigue and an assortment of homoeopathic remedies.

Setting a course towards Bonn, Hess used landmarks on the ground to orientate himself and make minor course corrections. When he reached the coast near the Frisian Islands, Hess turned and flew in an easterly direction for twenty minutes to stay out of range of British radar. He then took a heading of 335 degrees for the trip across the North Sea, initially at low altitude but travelling for most of the journey at 5,000 feet (1,500 m). At 20:58, he changed his heading to 245 degrees, intending to approach the coast of North East England near the village of Bamburgh, Northumberland. As it was not yet sunset when he first approached the coast, Hess backtracked, zigzagging back and forth for 40 minutes until it grew dark. Around this time, his auxiliary fuel tanks were exhausted so he released them into the sea. Also around this time, at 22:08, the British Chain Home station at Ottercops Moss near Newcastle upon Tyne detected the plane and informed the Filter Room at Bentley Priory. It was quickly detected by several other stations, and the aircraft was designated as "Raid 42".

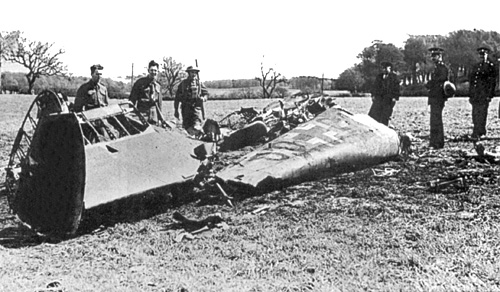
Wreckage of Hess's Messerschmitt Bf 110 at the site of the crash

Two Spitfires of No. 72 Squadron RAF, No. 13 Group RAF that were already in the air were sent to attempt an interception, but failed to find the intruder. A third Spitfire sent from Acklington at 22:20 also failed to spot the aircraft; by then, it was dark and Hess had dropped to an extremely low altitude, so low that the volunteer on duty at the Royal Observer Corps (ROC) station at Chatton was able to correctly identify it as a Bf 110, and reported its altitude as 50 feet (15 m). Tracked by additional ROC posts, Hess continued his flight into Scotland at high speed and low altitude, but was unable to spot his destination, Dungavel House, so he headed for the west coast to orientate himself and then turned back inland. At 22:35, a Boulton Paul Defiant sent from No. 141 Squadron RAF based at Ayr began pursuit. Hess was nearly out of fuel, so he climbed to 6,000 feet (1,800 m) and parachuted out of the plane at 23:06. He injured his foot, either whilst exiting the aircraft or when he hit the ground. The aircraft crashed at 23:09, about 12 miles (19 km) west of Dungavel House, the Duke of Hamilton's home. Hess would have been closer to his destination had he not had trouble exiting the aircraft. Hess's biographers Roger Manvell and Heinrich Fraenkel considered the flight to have been "the proudest technical achievement of Hess's life."

Before his departure from Germany, Hess had given his adjutant, Karlheinz Pintsch, a letter addressed to Hitler that detailed his plans to initiate peace negotiations with the UK. Hess intended to approach the Duke of Hamilton at his home in Lanarkshire, hoping that the duke might then be willing to advocate for and assist him in negotiating peace with Germany on terms that would be acceptable to Hitler. Pintsch delivered the letter to Hitler at the Berghof around noon on 11 May. After reading the letter, Hitler let loose a cry heard throughout the entire Berghof and sent for a number of his inner circle, concerned that a putsch might be underway.

US journalist Hubert Renfro Knickerbocker, who had met both Hitler and Hess, speculated that Hitler had sent Hess to deliver a message informing Winston Churchill of the forthcoming invasion of the Soviet Union, and offering a negotiated peace or even an anti-Bolshevik partnership. Soviet leader Joseph Stalin believed that Hess's flight had been engineered by the British. Stalin persisted in this belief as late as 1944, when he mentioned the matter to Churchill, who insisted that they had no advance knowledge of the flight. While some sources reported that Hess had been on an official mission, Churchill later stated in his book The Grand Alliance that in his view, the mission had not been authorised. "He came to us of his own free will, and, though without authority, had something of the quality of an envoy", said Churchill, and referred to Hess's plan as one of "lunatic benevolence". Ever since, speculation has continued that Hess's mission had been sanctioned by Hitler. Hess's flight to Scotland has been the subject of several other conspiracy theories, including one that he was duped by British Intelligence into undertaking his mission.

After the war, Albert Speer discussed the rationale for the flight with Hess, who told him that "the idea had been inspired in him in a dream by supernatural forces. We will guarantee England her empire; in return she will give us a free hand in Europe." While in Spandau prison, Hess told journalist Desmond Zwar that Germany could not win a war on two fronts. "I knew that there was only one way out – and that was certainly not to fight against England. Even though I did not get permission from the Führer to fly, I knew that what I had to say would have had his approval. Hitler had great respect for the English people ..." Hess wrote that his flight to Scotland was intended to initiate "the fastest way to win the war."

=== Capture ===
Shortly before midnight on 10 May 1941, Hess landed at Floors Farm, by Waterfoot, south of Glasgow, where he was discovered still struggling with his parachute by local ploughman David McLean. Identifying himself as "Hauptmann Alfred Horn", Hess said he had an important message for the Duke of Hamilton. McLean helped Hess to his nearby cottage and contacted the local Home Guard unit, who escorted the captive to their headquarters in Busby, East Renfrewshire. Hess was next taken to the police station at Giffnock, arriving after midnight. He was searched and his possessions confiscated. Hess repeatedly requested to meet with the Duke of Hamilton during questioning undertaken with the aid of an interpreter by Major Graham Donald, the area commandant of the Royal Observer Corps. After the interview, he was taken under guard to Maryhill Barracks in Glasgow, where his injuries were treated. By this time, some of his captors suspected his true identity, though Hess continued to insist his name was Horn.

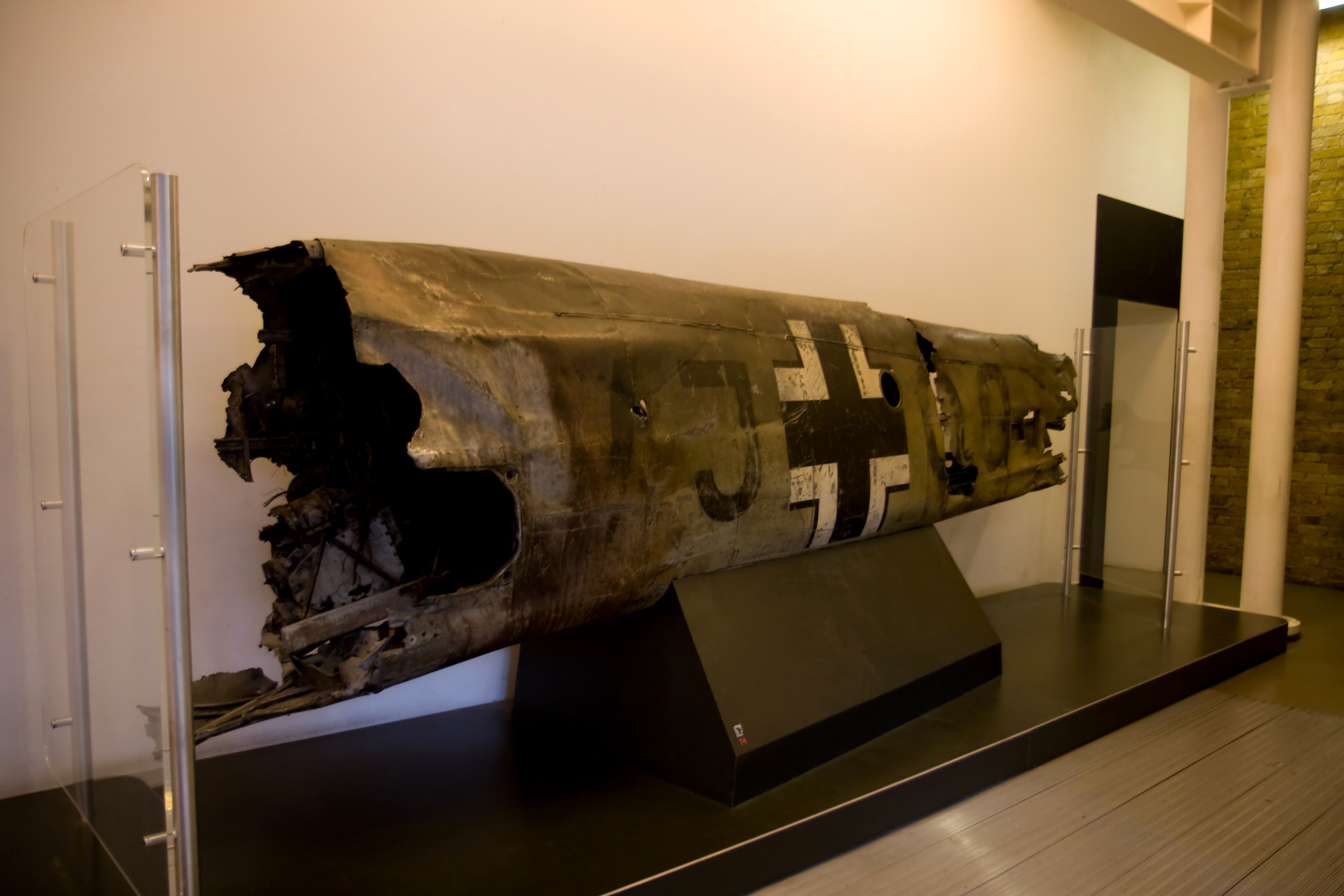
Part of the fuselage of Hess's Bf 110; Imperial War Museum (2008)

Hamilton had been on duty as wing commander at RAF Turnhouse near Edinburgh when Hess had arrived, and his station had been one of those that had tracked the progress of the flight. He arrived at Maryhill Barracks the next morning, and after examining Hess's effects, he met alone with the prisoner. Hess immediately admitted his true identity and outlined the reason for his flight. Hamilton told Hess that he hoped to continue the conversation with the aid of an interpreter; Hess could speak English well, but was having trouble understanding Hamilton. He told Hamilton that he was on a "mission of humanity" and that Hitler "wished to stop the fighting" with England.

After the meeting, Hamilton examined the remains of the Messerschmitt in the company of an intelligence officer, then returned to Turnhouse, where he made arrangements through the Foreign Office to meet Churchill, who was at Ditchley Park in Oxfordshire for the weekend. They had some preliminary talks that night, and Hamilton accompanied Churchill back to London the next day, where they both met with members of the War Cabinet. Churchill sent Hamilton with foreign affairs expert Ivone Kirkpatrick, who had met Hess previously, to positively identify the prisoner, who had been moved to Buchanan Castle overnight. Hess, who had prepared extensive notes to use during this meeting, spoke to them at length about Hitler's expansionary plans and the need for Britain to let the Nazis have free rein in Europe, in exchange for Britain being allowed to keep its overseas possessions. Kirkpatrick held two more meetings with Hess over the course of the next few days, while Hamilton returned to his duties. In addition to being disappointed at the apparent failure of his mission, Hess began claiming that his medical treatment was inadequate and that there was a plot afoot to poison him.

Hess's flight, but not his destination or fate, was first announced by Munich Radio in Germany on the evening of 12 May. The following day, Hitler sent Foreign Minister Joachim von Ribbentrop to give the news in person to Mussolini, and the British press was permitted to release full information about events that same day. On 14 May, Ilse Hess finally learned that her husband had survived the trip when news of his fate was broadcast on German radio.

Hitler worried that Germany's allies, Italy and Japan, would perceive Hess's act as an attempt by Hitler to secretly open peace negotiations with the British. Hitler contacted Mussolini specifically to reassure him otherwise. For this reason, Hitler ordered that the German press should characterise Hess as a madman who made the decision to fly to Scotland entirely on his own, without Hitler's knowledge or authority. Subsequent German newspaper reports described Hess as "deluded, deranged," indicating that his mental health had been affected by injuries sustained during World War I. Some members of Hitler's cabinet, including Göring and Propaganda Minister Joseph Goebbels, believed this only made matters worse, because if Hess truly were mentally ill, he should not have held an important government position. Goebbels commented in his diary that the German public was wondering how "such a fool" could be second to Hitler.

Hitler stripped Hess of all of his party and state offices, and secretly ordered him shot on sight if he ever returned to Germany. Hitler abolished the post of Deputy Führer, assigning Hess's former duties to Bormann, with the title of Head of the Party Chancellery. Bormann used the opportunity afforded by Hess's departure to secure significant power for himself. Meanwhile, Hitler initiated Aktion Hess, a flurry of hundreds of arrests of astrologers, faith healers and occultists that took place around 9 June. The campaign was part of a propaganda effort by Goebbels and others to denigrate Hess and to make scapegoats of occult practitioners.

Two sections of the fuselage of the aircraft were initially hidden by David McLean and later retrieved. One part was sold to the former assistant secretary of the Battle of Britain Association, who gave it to a war museum in the US; this 17.5 by 23 inches (44 by 58 cm) part was later sold by Bonhams at auction. Part of the fuel tank and a strut were offered for sale via Bonhams in 2014. Other wreckage was salvaged by 63 Maintenance Unit between 11 and 16 May 1941 and then taken to Oxford to be stored. The aeroplane had been armed with four machine guns in the nose, but carried no ammunition. One of the engines is on display at the RAF Museum while the Imperial War Museum displays another engine and part of the fuselage.

== Trial and imprisonment ==
=== Prisoner of war ===
From Buchanan Castle, Hess was transferred briefly to the Tower of London and then to Mytchett Place in Surrey, a fortified mansion, designated "Camp Z", where he stayed for the next 13 months. Churchill issued orders that Hess was to be treated well, though he was not allowed to read newspapers or listen to the radio. Three intelligence officers were stationed onsite and 150 soldiers were placed on guard. By early June, Hess was allowed to write to his family. He also prepared a letter to the Duke of Hamilton, but it was never delivered, and his repeated requests for further meetings were turned down. Major Frank Foley, the leading German expert in MI6 and former British Passport Control Officer in Berlin, took charge of a year-long abortive debriefing of Hess, according to Foreign Office files released to the National Archives. Henry V. Dicks and John Rawlings Rees, psychiatrists who treated Hess during this period, noted that while he was not insane, he was mentally unstable, with tendencies toward hypochondria and paranoia. Hess repeated his peace proposal to John Simon, 1st Viscount Simon, then serving as Lord Chancellor, in an interview on 9 June 1942. Lord Simon noted that the prisoner's mental state was not good; Hess claimed he was being poisoned and was being prevented from sleeping. He would insist on swapping his dinner with that of one of his guards, and attempted to get them to send samples of the food out for analysis. At this time he resumed eating meat, and continued to include it in his diet during his incarceration at Spandau.

While in Scotland, Hess claimed to have discovered a "secret force" controlling the minds of Churchill and other British leaders, filling them with an irrational hatred of Germany. Hess claimed that the force acted on Hitler's mind as well, causing him to make poor military decisions. He said that the Jews had psychic powers that allowed them to control the minds of others, including Himmler, and that the Holocaust was part of a Jewish plot to defame Germany.

In the early morning hours of 16 June 1942, Hess rushed his guards and attempted suicide by jumping over the railing of the staircase at Mytchett Place. He fell onto the stone floor below, fracturing the femur of his left leg. The injury required that the leg be kept in traction for 12 weeks, with a further six weeks bed rest before he was permitted to walk with crutches. Captain Munro Johnson of the Royal Army Medical Corps, who assessed Hess, noted that another suicide attempt was likely to occur in the near future. Hess began around this time to complain of amnesia. This symptom and some of his increasingly erratic behaviour may have in part been a ruse, because if he were declared mentally ill, he could be repatriated under the terms of the Geneva Conventions.

Hess was moved to Maindiff Court Hospital on 26 June 1942, where he remained for the next three years. The facility was chosen for its added security and the need for fewer guards. Hess was allowed walks on the grounds and car trips into the surrounding countryside. He had access to newspapers and other reading materials; he wrote letters and journals. His mental health remained under the care of Dr. Rees. Hess continued to complain on and off of memory loss and made a second suicide attempt on 4 February 1945, when he stabbed himself with a bread knife. The wound was not serious, requiring two stitches. Despondent that Germany was losing the war, he took no food for the next week, and did not resume eating until he was threatened with being force-fed.

Germany surrendered unconditionally on 8 May 1945. Hess, facing charges as a war criminal, was ordered to appear before the International Military Tribunal and was transported to Nuremberg on 10 October 1945.

=== Nuremberg trials ===
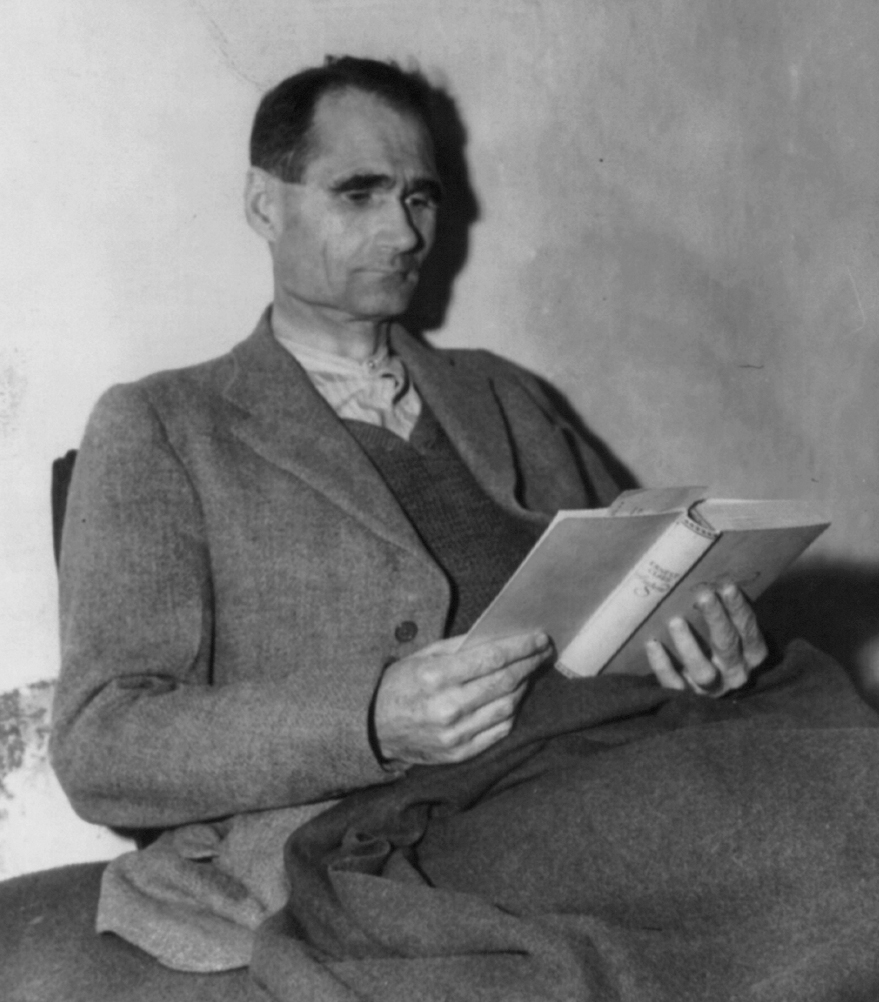
Hess in his cell at Nuremberg in November 1945

The Allies of World War II held a series of military tribunals and trials, beginning with a trial of the major war criminals from November 1945 to October 1946. Hess was tried with this first group of 23 defendants, all of whom were charged with several counts from conspiracy to commit crimes, crimes against peace, war crimes and crimes against humanity, in violation of international laws governing warfare.

On his arrival in Nuremberg, Hess was reluctant to give up some of his possessions, including samples of food he said had been poisoned by the British; he proposed to use these for his defence during the trial. The commandant of the facility, Colonel Burton C. Andrus of the United States Army, advised him that he would be allowed no special treatment; the samples were sealed and confiscated. Hess's diaries indicate that he did not acknowledge the validity of the court and felt the outcome was a foregone conclusion. He was thin when he arrived, weighing 65 kilograms (143 lb), and had a poor appetite, but was deemed to be in good health. As one defendant, Robert Ley, had managed to hang himself in his cell on 24 October, the remaining prisoners were monitored around the clock. Because of his previous suicide attempts, Hess was handcuffed to a guard whenever he was out of his cell.

Almost immediately after his arrival, Hess began exhibiting amnesia, which may have been feigned in the hope of avoiding the death sentence. The chief psychiatrist at Nuremberg, Douglas Kelley of the US Military, gave the opinion that the defendant suffered from "a true psychoneurosis, primarily of the hysterical type, engrafted on a basic paranoid and schizoid personality, with amnesia, partly genuine and partly feigned", but found him fit to stand trial. Efforts were made to trigger his memory, including bringing in his former secretaries and showing old newsreels, but he persisted in showing no response to these stimuli. The tribunal's Chief medical officer, Lieutenant Colonel Rene Juchli, declared that Hess was suffering from intentional amnesia. When he was allowed to make a statement to the tribunal on 30 November, Hess admitted that he had faked memory loss as a tactic.

The prosecution's case against Hess was presented by Mervyn Griffith-Jones beginning on 7 February 1946. By quoting from Hess's speeches, he attempted to demonstrate that Hess had been aware of and agreed with Hitler's plans to conduct a war of aggression in violation of international law. He declared that as Hess had signed important governmental decrees, including the decree requiring mandatory military service, the Nuremberg racial laws, and a decree incorporating the conquered Polish territories into the Reich, he must share responsibility for the acts of the regime. Griffith-Jones pointed out that the timing of Hess's trip to Scotland, only six weeks before the German invasion of the Soviet Union, could only be viewed as an attempt by Hess to prevent the British from interfering. Hess resumed showing symptoms of amnesia at the end of February, partway through the prosecution's case.

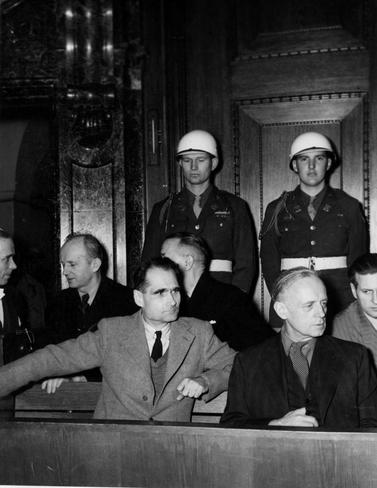
Hess (left) and Joachim von Ribbentrop in the defendants' box at the Nuremberg Trials

At the opening of the trial in November 1945, Hess responded "nein" (no) when asked to enter a plea. The court recorded this as a "not guilty" plea. The case for Hess's defence was presented from 22 to 26 March 1946 by his lawyer, Dr Alfred Seidl. He noted that while Hess accepted responsibility for the many decrees he had signed, he said these matters were part of the internal workings of a sovereign state and thus outside the purview of a war crimes trial. He called to the stand Ernst Wilhelm Bohle, the man who had been head of the NSDAP/AO, to testify on Hess's behalf. When Griffith-Jones presented questions about the organisation's spying in several countries, Bohle testified that any warlike activities such as espionage had been done without his permission or knowledge. Seidl called two other witnesses, former mayor of Stuttgart Karl Strölin and Hess's brother Alfred, both of whom repudiated the allegations that the NSDAP/AO had been spying and fomenting war. Seidl presented a summation of the defence's case on 25 July, in which he attempted to refute the charge of conspiracy by pointing out that Hitler alone had made all the important decisions. He noted that Hess could not be held responsible for any events that took place after he left Germany in May 1941. Meanwhile, Hess mentally detached himself from what was happening, declining visits from his family and refusing to read the newspapers. Hess spoke to the tribunal again on 31 August 1946 during the last day of closing statements, where he made a lengthy statement.

The court deliberated for nearly two months before passing judgement on 30 September, with the defendants being individually sentenced the following day. Hess was found guilty on two counts: crimes against peace (planning and preparing a war of aggression), and conspiracy with other German leaders to commit crimes. He was found not guilty of war crimes and crimes against humanity. Hess was given a life sentence, one of seven Nazis to receive prison sentences at the trial. These seven were transported by aircraft to the Allied military prison at Spandau in Berlin on 18 July 1947. The Soviet member of the tribunal, Major-General Iona Nikitchenko, filed a document recording his dissent of Hess's sentence; he felt the death sentence was warranted.

=== Spandau Prison ===
Spandau was placed under the control of the Allied Control Council, the governing body in charge of the military occupation of Germany, which consisted of representatives from the UK, France, the United States, and the Soviet Union. Each country supplied prison guards for a month at a time on a rotating basis. After the inmates were given medical examinations—Hess refused his body search, and had to be held down—they were provided with prison garb and assigned the numbers by which they were addressed throughout their stay. Hess was Number 7. The prison had a small library and inmates were allowed to file special requests for additional reading material. Writing materials were limited; each inmate was allowed four pieces of paper per month for letters. They were not allowed to speak to one another without permission and were expected to work in the facility, helping with cleaning and gardening chores. The inmates were taken for outdoor walks around the prison grounds for an hour each day, separated by about 10 yards (9 m). Some of the rules became more relaxed as time went on.

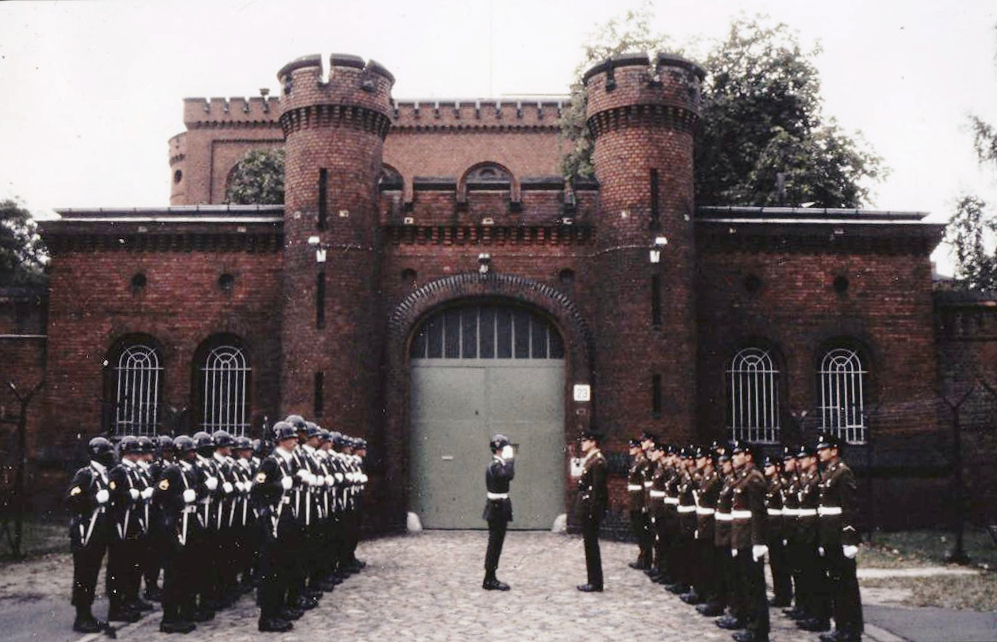
Changing of the guard at Spandau Prison, mid-1980s

Visitors were allowed to come for half an hour per month, but Hess forbade his family to visit until December 1969, when he was a patient at the British Military Hospital in West Berlin for a perforated ulcer. By this time, Wolf Rüdiger Hess was 32 years old and Ilse 69; they had not seen Hess since his departure from Germany in 1941. After this illness, he allowed his family to visit regularly. His daughter-in-law, Andrea, who often brought photos and films of his grandchildren, became a particularly welcome visitor. Hess's health problems, both mental and physical, were ongoing during his captivity. He cried out in the night, claiming he had stomach pains. He continued to suspect that his food was being poisoned and complained of amnesia. A psychiatrist who examined him in 1957 deemed that Hess was not ill enough to be transferred to a mental hospital. Hess attempted suicide again in 1977.

Other than his stays in hospital, Hess spent the rest of his life in Spandau Prison. His fellow inmates Konstantin von Neurath, Walther Funk, and Erich Raeder were released because of poor health in the 1950s; Karl Dönitz, Baldur von Schirach, and Albert Speer served their time and were released; Dönitz left in 1956, Schirach and Speer in 1966. The 600-cell prison continued to be maintained for its lone prisoner from 1966 until Hess's death in 1987, at an estimated annual cost of DM 800,000. Conditions were far more pleasant in the 1980s than in the early years; Hess was allowed to move more freely around the cell block, setting his own routine and choosing his own activities, which included television, films, reading, and gardening. A lift was installed so he could easily reach the garden, and he was provided with a medical orderly from 1982 onward.

Hess's lawyer Alfred Seidl launched numerous appeals for his release, beginning as early as 1947. These were denied, mainly because the Soviets repeatedly vetoed the proposal. Spandau was located in West Berlin, and its existence gave the Soviets a foothold in that sector of the city. Additionally, Soviet officials believed Hess must have known in 1941 that an attack on their country was imminent. In 1967, Wolf Rüdiger Hess began a campaign to win his father's release, garnering support from politicians such as Geoffrey Lawrence (Note: Lawrence had been the president of the judicial group at the International Military Tribunal in Nuremberg.) in the UK and Willy Brandt in West Germany, but to no avail, in spite of the prisoner's advanced age and deteriorating health. In 1967, Wolf Hess founded a society that by September had collected 700 signatures on a petition calling for Hess's release. By 1974, 350,000 people had signed the petition. The American historian Norman Goda wrote that those who campaigned to free Hess routinely exaggerated the harshness of his imprisonment. Goda states that Wolf Hess's efforts to free his father ultimately backfired as he conflated the question of whether his father deserved release on humanitarian grounds with the question of whether his father was guilty. Wolf argued that his father was unjustly imprisoned to hide the UK's "war guilt", arguing that millions of lives could have been saved if only Churchill had accepted Hess's peace offer in May 1941. In 1973, the Israeli foreign minister Abba Eban charged that Hess was not being treated as badly as his champions claimed and that he should serve his full sentence.

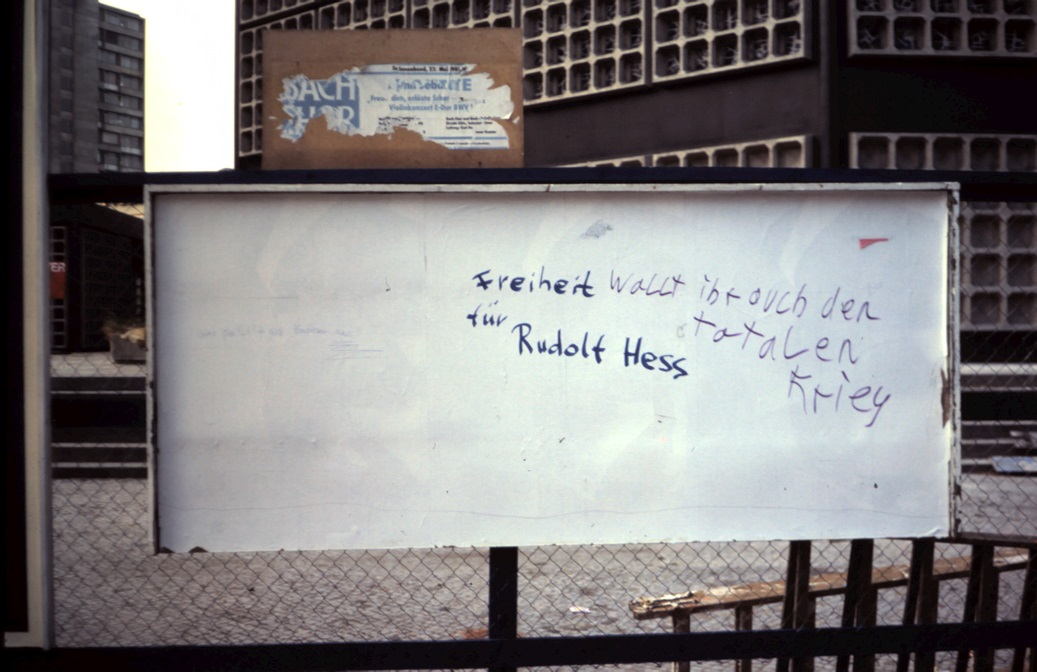
Graffiti on a hoarding outside Kaiser Wilhelm Memorial Church in West Berlin in 1981. The comments read "Freedom for Rudolf Hess" and "Do you also want total war?"

In September 1979, medical tests showed that Hess was suffering from potentially fatal prostate cancer. In a letter dated 8 September 1979, Hess announced that he would refuse treatment unless released, saying he deserved freedom as an "unjustly convicted man" and that if he were to die, his death would be on the consciences of the leaders of the UK, France, the Soviet Union, and the United States. US Secretary of State Cyrus Vance wrote: "Far from representing the beginning of irrationality, Hess's well considered attempt is to use his medical condition to 'force' his release". The British Foreign Secretary, Lord Carrington, appealed for Hess's release, but Soviet Foreign Minister Andrei Gromyko refused on the grounds that Hess had never "shown even a shadow of repentance" and was still claiming innocence. Gromyko also said that many people would take Hess's release as confirmation of a wrongful conviction. Hess's appeal to neo-Nazi groups in West Germany further increased the Soviet unwillingness to consider his release.

Hess continued to be an unapologetic Nazi and antisemite; this was usually ignored by those championing his release, who portrayed him as a harmless old man. Hess further hindered efforts to get himself released by promising to make no statements to the media if he were released, while repeatedly writing drafts of statements that he planned to make. On 25 June 1986, a Soviet guard caught Charles Gabel, the chaplain at Spandau, attempting to smuggle out a statement by Hess, causing Gabel to be fired. Hess had originally written the document as his opening address at the Nuremberg trial in 1946, which he had been unable to deliver in full after the judges cut him short. Hess tried to mail a copy of the statement to Sir Oswald Mosley in October 1946, but the letter was intercepted by his US guards. Hess's statement (both the 1946 version and the 1986 version) claimed that Germany's attack on the Soviet Union was preemptive; he claimed there had been overwhelming evidence that the Soviet Union had planned to attack Germany. He said in the statement that he had decided to make his flight to Scotland without informing Hitler, with the aim of informing the UK of the Soviet danger to "European civilisation" and the entire world. He believed his warning would cause the UK to end its war with Germany and join in the fight against the Soviet Union.

== Death and aftermath ==
Hess was found dead on 17 August 1987, aged 93, in a summer house that had been set up in the prison garden as a reading room; he had hanged himself using an extension cable strung over a window latch. A short note to his family was found in his pocket, thanking them for all that they had done. The Four-Powers Authority released a statement on 17 September ruling the death a suicide. Spandau Prison, where Hess had been the only inmate since 1966, was demolished shortly after his death to prevent it from becoming a neo-Nazi shrine.

Hess's lawyer Alfred Seidl felt that he was too old and frail to have managed to kill himself. Wolf Rüdiger Hess repeatedly claimed that his father had been murdered by the British Secret Intelligence Service to prevent him from revealing information about British misconduct during the war. According to an investigation by the British government in 1989, the available evidence did not back up the claim that Hess was murdered, and Solicitor General Sir Nicholas Lyell saw no grounds for further investigation. The autopsy results supported the conclusion that Hess had killed himself. A report declassified and published in 2012 led to questions again being asked as to whether Hess had been murdered. Historian Peter Padfield wrote that the suicide note found on the body appeared to have been written when Hess was hospitalised in 1969.

Hess was initially buried at a secret location to avoid media attention or demonstrations by Nazi sympathisers, but his body was re-interred in a family plot at Wunsiedel on 17 March 1988; his wife was subsequently buried beside him in 1995. Hess's grave became a destination for neo-Nazi pilgrimage and for demonstrations each August on the anniversary of his death. To prevent further pilgrimages, the parish council did not extend the grave's lease when it expired in 2011. With the eventual consent of his family, Hess's grave was re-opened on 20 July 2011. The remains were cremated and the ashes scattered at sea by family members. The gravestone, which bore the epitaph "Ich habs gewagt" ("I dared to do it"), was destroyed.

A myth that the Spandau prisoner was not actually Hess was disproved in 2019. A study of DNA testing undertaken by Sherman McCall, formerly of the Walter Reed Army Medical Center, and Jan Cemper-Kiesslich of the University of Salzburg demonstrated a 99.99 per cent match between the prisoner's Y chromosome DNA markers and those of a living male Hess relative.

== See also ==
- List of Nazi Party leaders and officials
- List of SS-Obergruppenführer
- Neue Deutsche Heilkunde
- Glossary of Nazi Germany
