= El Atareen =

El Ataaren العطارين
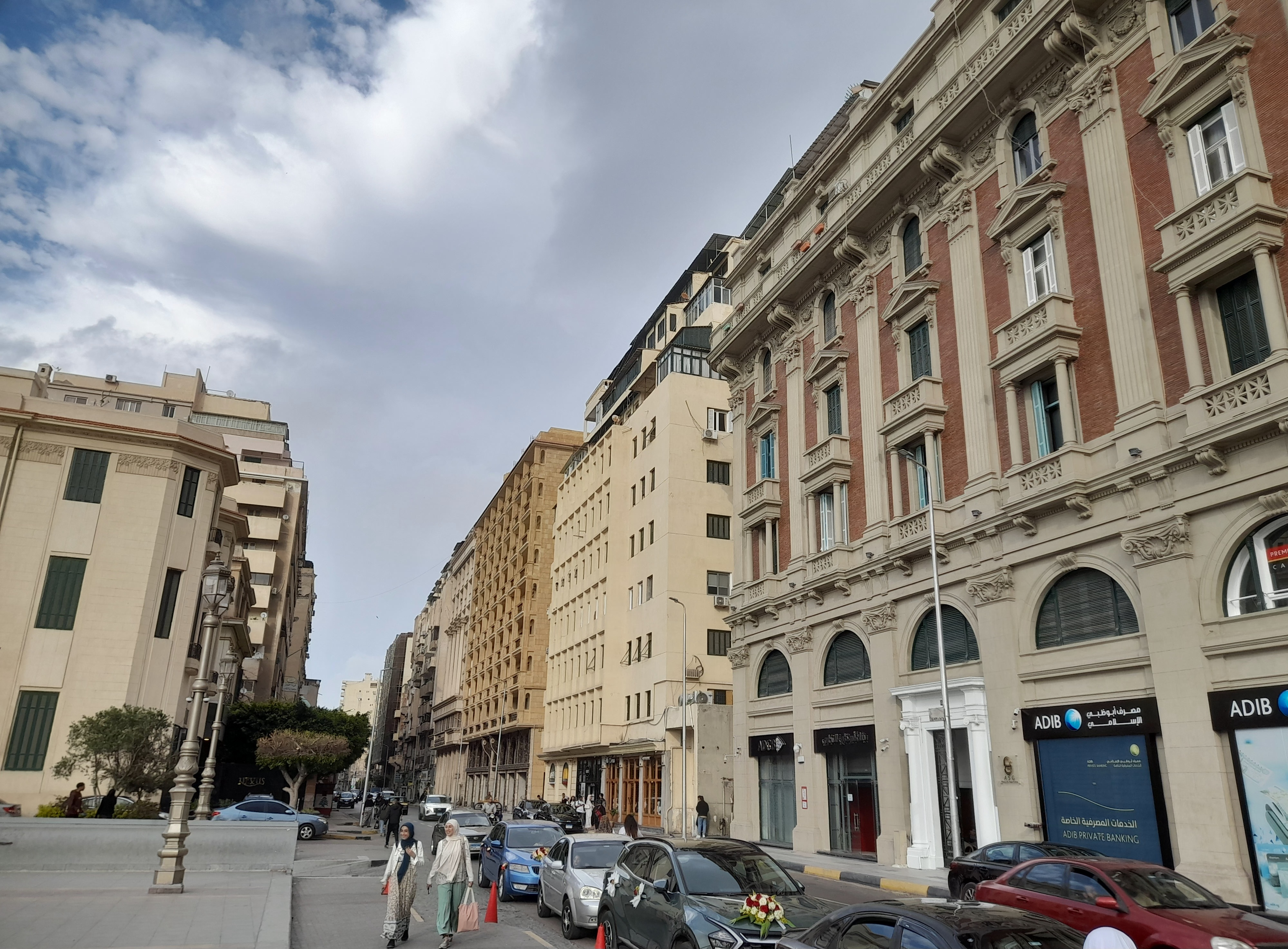
- A street in El Atareen

- Location in Egypt
- Coordinates: 31.194957°N 29.898068°E
- Country: Egypt
- Governorate: Alexandria
- City: Alexandria
- Time zone: UTC+2 (EET)
  - Summer (DST): UTC+3 (EEST)

El Attarin or El Atareen (Arabic: العطارين) is a neighborhood in Alexandria, Egypt. The district was named after the Attarin Market in the center of Alexandria when it was an important commercial center, and was famous for the spice trade, especially during the Islamic conquest of Egypt. The Attarin Market was famous for spices and perfumes, and was even considered one of the most famous spice markets in the world.

== See also ==
- Neighborhoods in Alexandria
