= Al Hadrah =

Hadara الحضرة
- Location in Egypt
- Coordinates: 31.20179°N 29.932323°E
- Country: Egypt
- Governorate: Alexandria
- City: Alexandria
- Time zone: UTC+2 (EET)
  - Summer (DST): UTC+3 (EEST)

Hadara (Arabic: الحضرة) is a neighborhood in Alexandria, Egypt.

== See also ==
- Al Hadra University Hospital.
