= El Ibrahimiyya (neighborhood) =

El Ibrahimiyya الإبراهيمية
- Location in Egypt
- Coordinates: 31.215077°N 29.92743°E
- Country: Egypt
- Governorate: Alexandria
- City: Alexandria
- Time zone: UTC+2 (EET)
  - Summer (DST): UTC+3 (EEST)

El Ibrahimiyya (Arabic: الإبراهيمية) is a neighborhood in Alexandria, Egypt. The Ibrahimia district is located in the center of Alexandria. It is one of the oldest districts of the city, and one of the districts overlooking the Mediterranean Sea. The district is usually crowded day and night. Its alleys are narrow and its houses are closely packed together. It was inhabited by the middle class from the Greek Egyptians, Italian Egyptians, Armenian and French communities until the end of the 20th century. Until recent decades, the district was the Greek community district in Alexandria.

== Name ==
It may be thought that the name of the “Ibrahimiya” district is in reference to Ibrahim Pasha, son of Muhammad Ali Pasha, the famous military leader and first commander of the modern Egyptian army. But in fact, “Ibrahimiya” is in reference to his grandson: Prince Ibrahim, son of Prince Ahmed Rifaat Pasha, the eldest son of Ibrahim Pasha, son of Muhammad Ali.

Prince Ibrahim, son of Prince Ahmed Rifat Pasha, is the father of the two nobles, Mohamed Ali Ibrahim and Amr Ibrahim. The entire land of the Ibrahimiya area was owned by him, including the lands of the Alexandria Sporting Club.

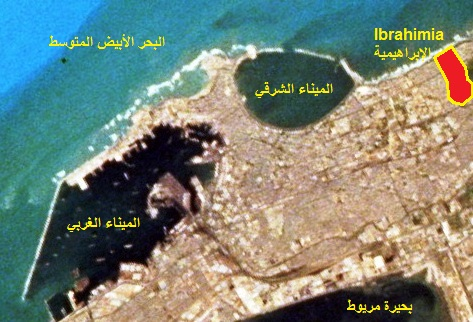
El Ibrahimiyya District.

== See also ==
- Neighborhoods in Alexandria
