= Sidi Yaqut Al-Arsh Mosque =

Mosque in Alexandria, Egypt

- مسجد سيدي ياقوط العرش
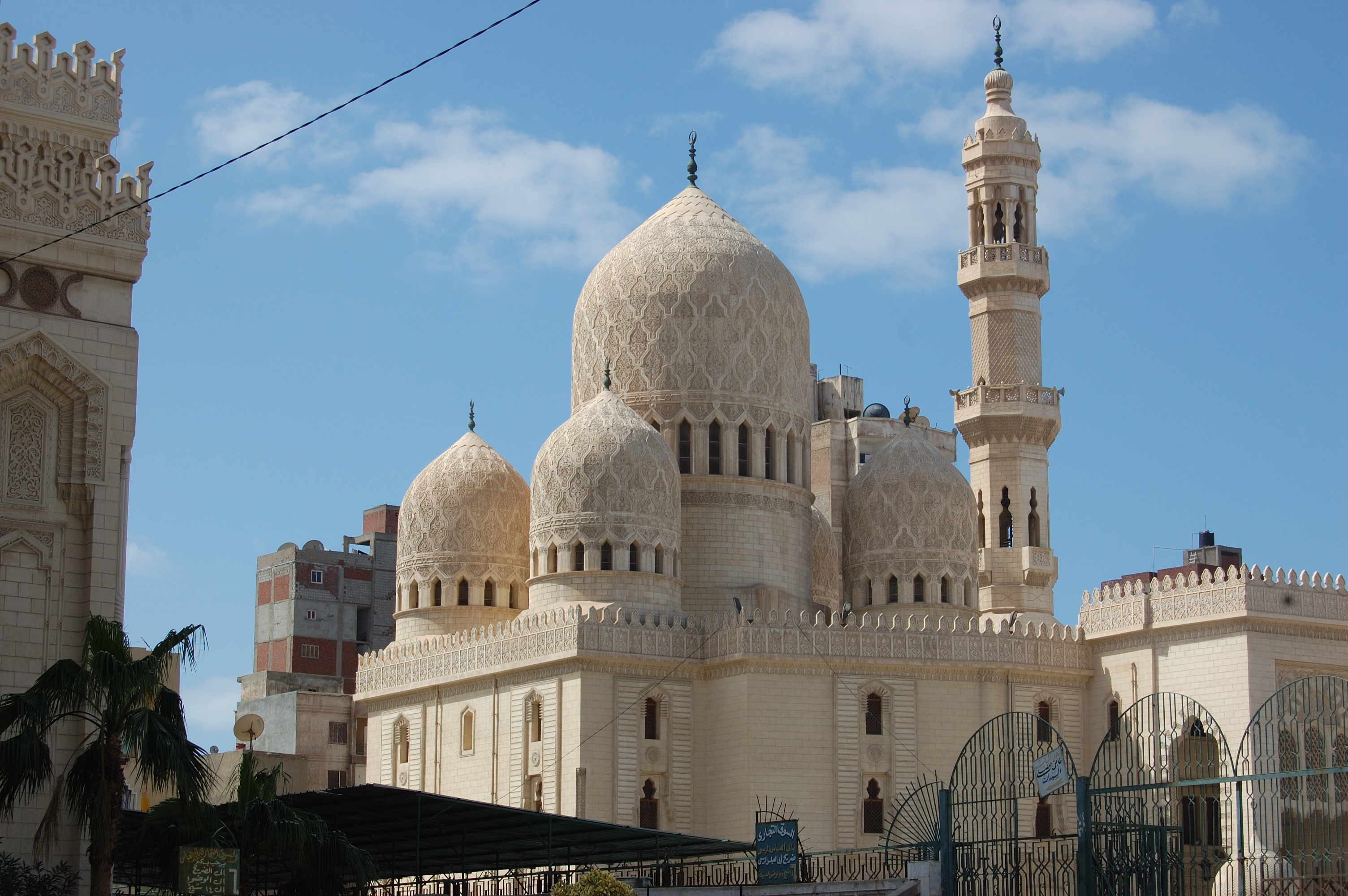

- Location of the mosque in the Nile Delta

Religion
- Affiliation: Islam
- Ecclesiastical or organizational status: Mosque and mausoleum
- Status: Active

Location
- Location: Anfoushi, Alexandria
- Country: Egypt
- Interactive map of Sidi Yaqut Al-Arsh Mosque
- Coordinates: 31°12′21″N 29°52′53″E

Architecture
- Architect: Mario Rossi
- Type: Mosque
- Style: Neo-Mamluk
- Completed: 1943

Specifications
- Dome: 3 (maybe more)
- Minaret: 2
- Shrine: 1: Yaqut Al Arsh

The Sidi Yaqut Al-Arsh Mosque (Arabic: مسجد سيدي ياقوت العرش, romanized: Masjid Sīdī Yāqūt al-ʻarsh) is a mosque, located in the Anfoushi neighbourhood of Alexandria, on the north coast of Egypt. It is named after Yaqut Al Arsh, an imam who lived in Alexandria during the 13th century.

The mosque is located adjacent to both the Al-Busiri Mosque and the Abu al-Abbas al-Mursi Mosque, and all three mosques face the same central sahn.

== History ==
After Yaqut's death in 1331 CE, he was buried next to the mosque of his teacher and father-in-law, the famous Abu al-Abbas al-Mursi, and next to what then used to be the zawiya of Al-Busiri (another disciple of Abu al-Abbas).

In 1934, King Fouad I ordered the construction of a 3,200-square-metre (34,000 sq ft) sahn for an expanded Abu al-Abbas Mosque, a new mosque built on the site of Busiri's zawiya, and a new mosque built on Yaqut's tomb. All the buildings of the area were extensively renovated and built by Mario Rossi, an Italian architect, who was involved in planning the design and decor of the mosques until the completion of the entire project in 1943. In 2023, as part of a larger campaign to renovate the historic mosques in the area, the mosque underwent extensive repair works.

== Construction ==
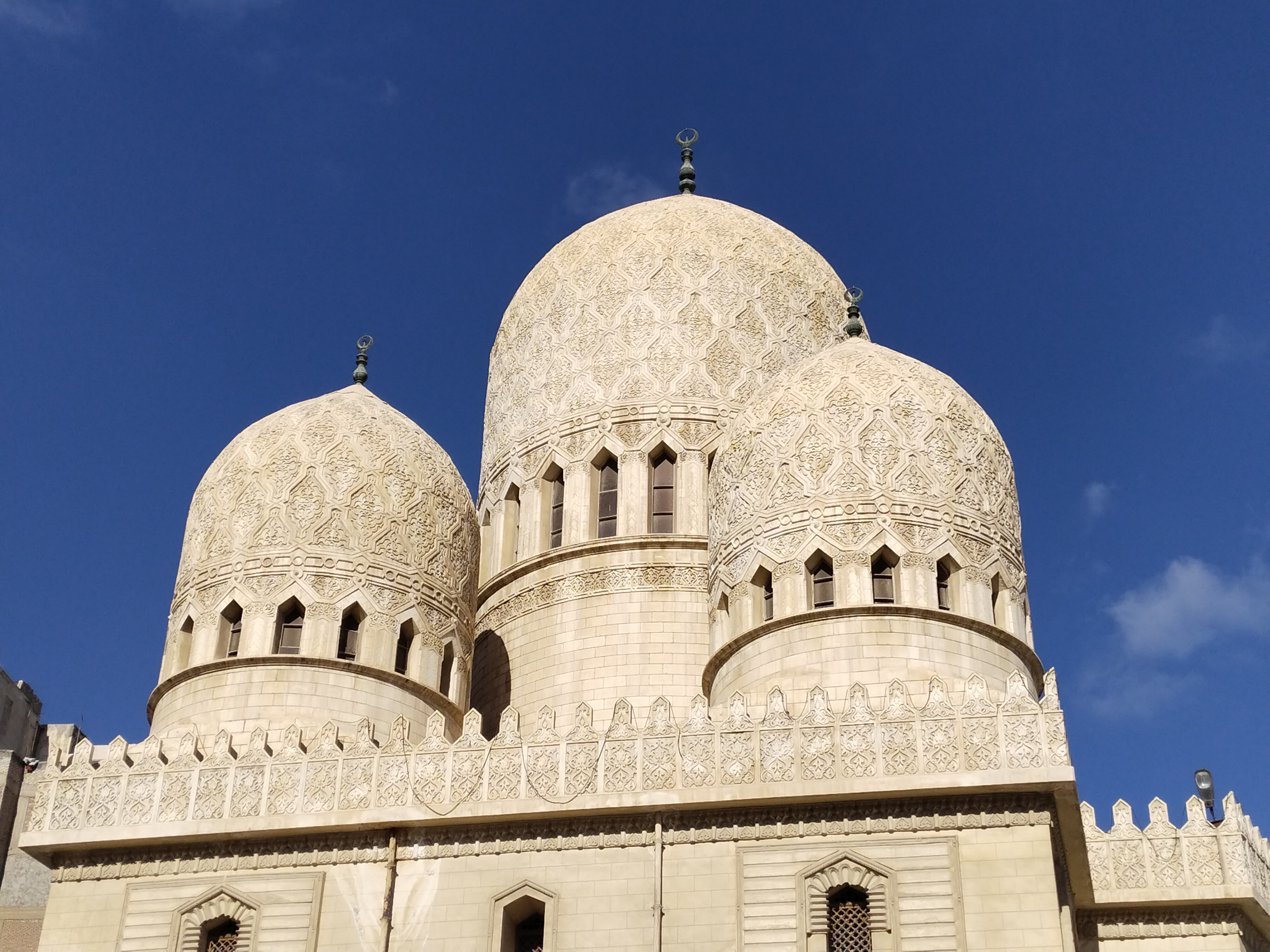
Detail of the domes

The mosque's entrance door is large and decorated with carved motifs. Inside, the mosque's ceiling rests on six octagonal mosaic columns with decorative bases and topped with Arabic-style capitals. There are three doors on the northern side of the mosque's sahn. The middle door leads to the shrine, a square niche made of precious wood. The niche is located in the center of the room and contains the tomb of Yaqut al-Arsh.

== See also ==
- Islam in Egypt
- List of mosques in Alexandria
- List of mosques in Egypt
