= Al-Busiri Mosque =

Mosque in Alexandria, Egypt

- مسجد الامام البوصيري
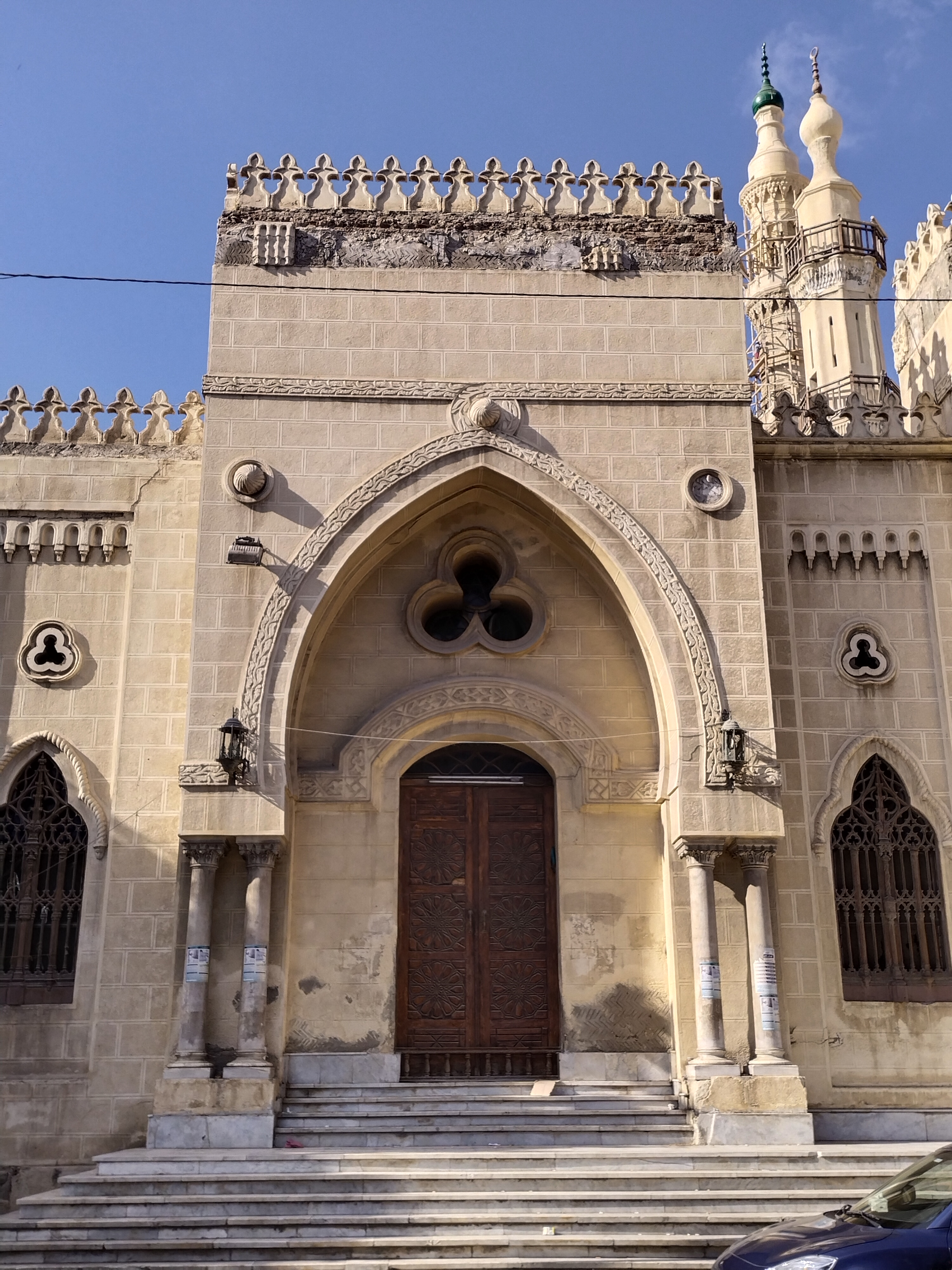

- Location of the mosque in the Nile Delta

Religion
- Affiliation: Islam
- Ecclesiastical or organisational status: Mosque and mausoleum
- Status: Active

Location
- Location: Anfoushi, Alexandria
- Country: Egypt
- Interactive map of Al-Busiri Mosque
- Coordinates: 31°12′20″N 29°53′00″E

Architecture
- Architect: Mario Rossi (c. 1940s)
- Type: Mosque
- Style: Ottoman; Neo-Mamluk (minaret)
- Completed: 1858

Specifications
- Dome: 7 (maybe more)
- Minaret: 1
- Shrine: 1: Al-Busiri

Al-Busiri Mosque (Arabic: مسجد الإمام البوصيري, romanized: Masjid Al-Imam Al-Busiri, also Masjid wa-Qubbat Sharaf al-Din al-Busiri), also known as Imam Al Busiri Mosque, is a mosque located in the Anfoushi neighbourhood of Alexandria, on the north coast of Egypt. The mosque is named in honour of Al-Busiri, a Sanhaji Sufi Imam who lived in Alexandria during the 13th century, and it is where his tomb is located.

The mosque is located adjacent to both the Abu al-Abbas al-Mursi Mosque and the Sidi Yaqut Al-Arsh Mosque, and all three mosques face the same central sahn.

== History ==
The mosque was built in 1858 after a mosque was instructed to be built on the site of Imam Al-Busiri's tomb on the orders of Sa'id the Wali of Egypt.

Restorations took place in 1898 on the order of Tewfik Pasha, the Khedive of Egypt. In 1934, King Fouad I ordered the construction of a 3,200-square-metre (34,000 sq ft) sahn for an expanded Abu al-Abbas Mosque, a new mosque built on the site of Busiri's zawiya, and a new mosque built on Yaqut's tomb. All the buildings of the area were extensively renovated and built by Mario Rossi, an Italian architect, who was involved in planning the design and decor of the mosques until the completion of the entire project in 1943. In 2006, the Islamic Antiquities Department of the Alexandria Governorate announced that E£3,000,000 was allocated to restore the Al-Busiri Mosque.

== Architecture ==
The mosque contains two separate sahns, the first of which contains a fountain, and the second contains the iwan, which faces the qibla. It is higher than the level of the mosque's courtyard. The mosque also contains a shrine, which is a square room that contains the tomb of Imam Al-Busiri and is covered by a dome which features muqarnas.

The mosque's minaret was built in the Neo-Mamluk architectural style, the same style as both the adjacent Abu al-Abbas al-Mursi Mosque and the Sidi Yaqut Al-Arsh Mosque. Several verses from Al-Busiri's poem Al-Burda are displayed in the mosque.

== Gallery ==
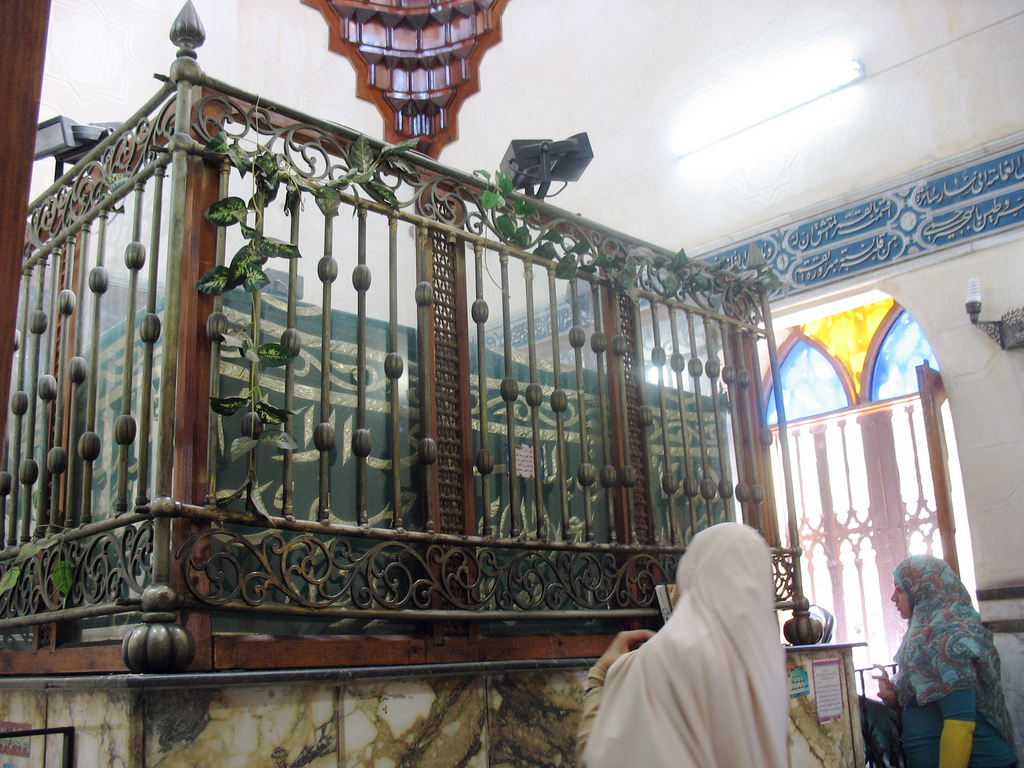
Tomb of Imam Al-Busiri, in the mosque

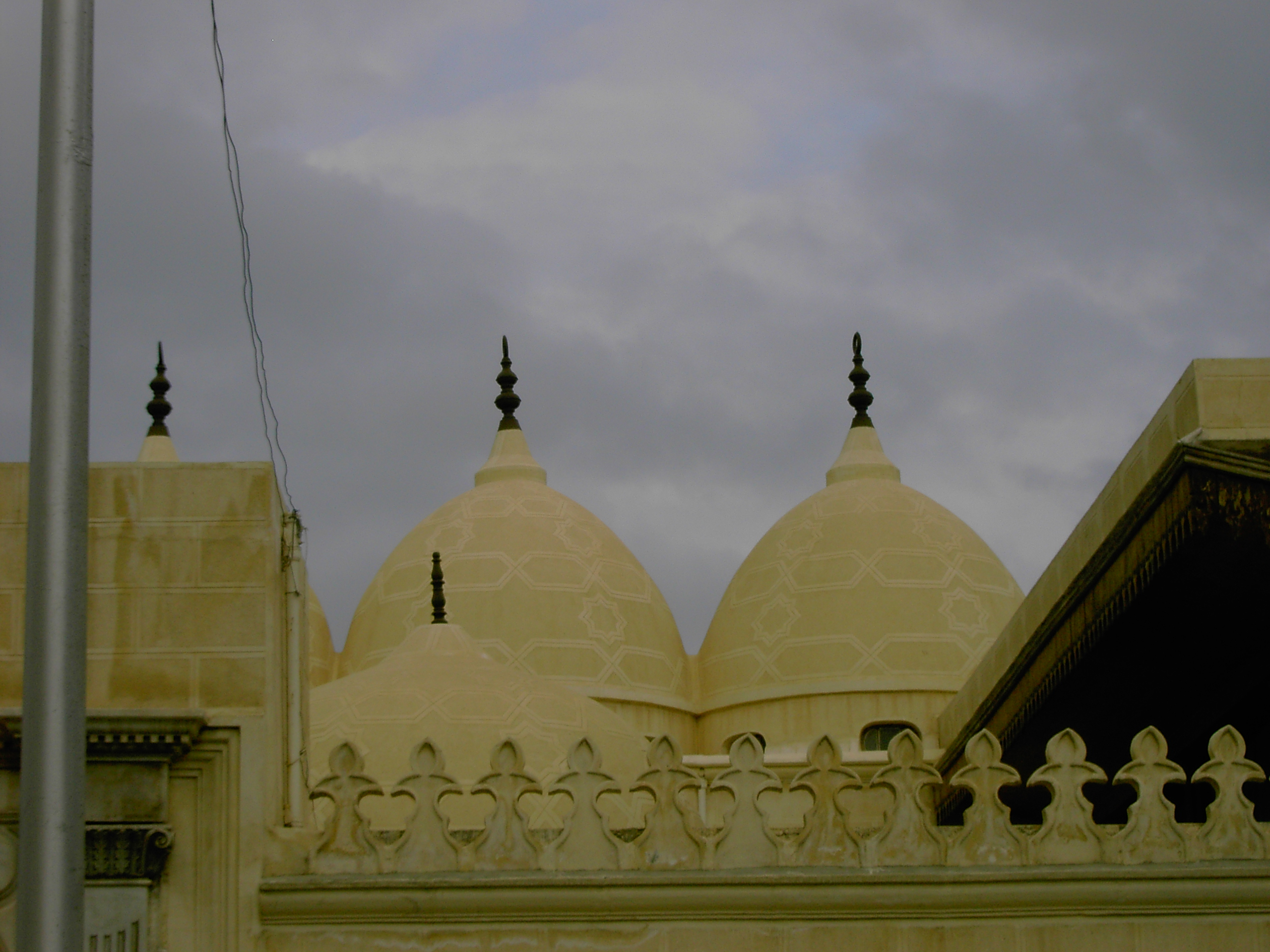
Mosque domes in 2006

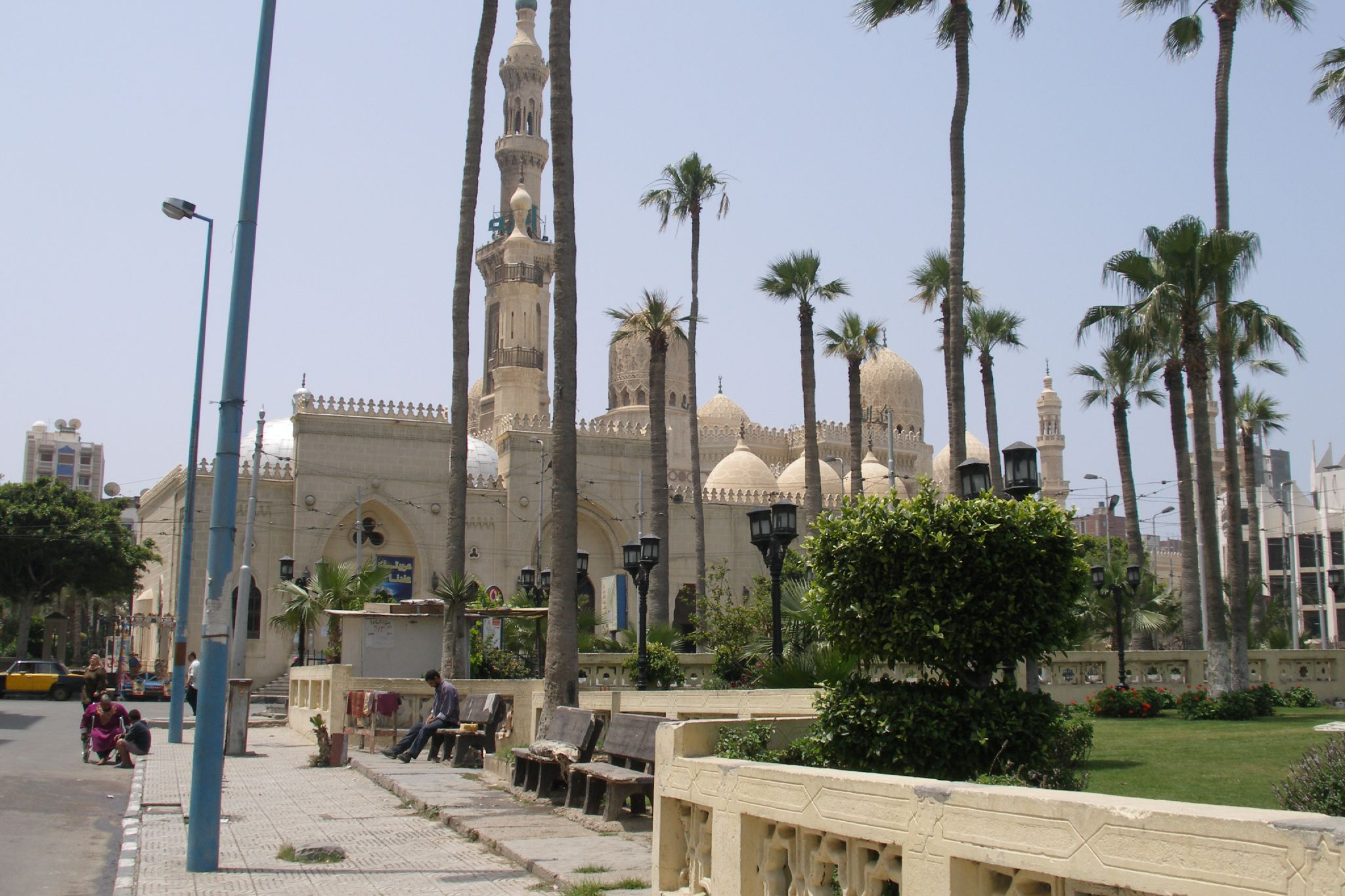
The mosque in 2007

== See also ==
- Islam in Egypt
- List of mosques in Alexandria
- List of mosques in Egypt
