= Al-Qaed Ibrahim Mosque =

Mosque in Alexandria, Egypt

- مسجد القائد إبراهيم
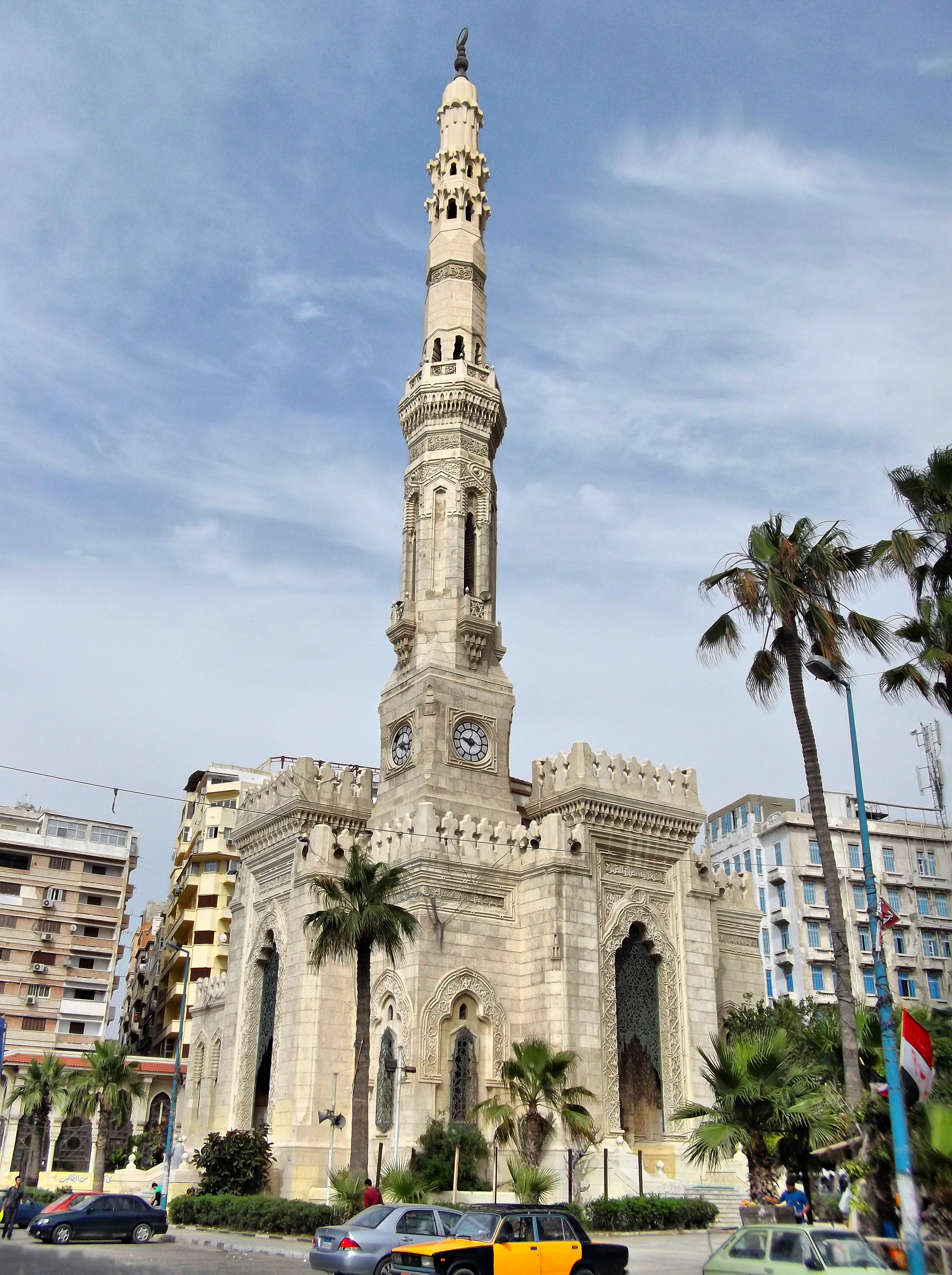

- Location of the mosque in the Nile Delta

Religion
- Affiliation: Islam
- Ecclesiastical or organizational status: Mosque
- Status: Active

Location
- Location: Mahatet El Raml, Alexandria
- Country: Egypt
- Interactive map of Al-Qaed Ibrahim Mosque
- Coordinates: 31°12′12″N 29°54′14″E

Architecture
- Architect: Mario Rossi
- Type: Mosque
- Style: Neo-Mamluk; Ottoman
- Completed: 1948

Specifications
- Dome: 1
- Minaret: 1

Al-Qaed Ibrahim Mosque (Arabic: مسجد القائد إبراهيم, romanized: Masjid ālqāed Ibrāhym, lit. 'Commander Ibrahim Mosque') is a mosque located in the Raml Station area of Alexandria, on the north coast of Egypt. The mosque is named in honour of Ibrahim Pasha, the former Wali of Egypt and the founder of the modern Egyptian military. During the 2011 Egyptian revolution, it was an important gathering place for protesters.

== History ==
Its construction dates from 1948, and it was designed by Mario Rossi, an Italian architect. The mosque was erected on the centenary of the death of Commander Ibrahim Pasha. In 2011, the sahn was used by protestors in their demonstrations against the government. In 2017, there were protests at the mosque following the decision by the United States to move its embassy from Tel Aviv to Jerusalem.

== Architecture ==
The Al-Qaed Ibrahim Mosque has selected decorations from different eras. It has a graceful, high minaret, which is also distinguished from other minarets by the presence of a clock. The mosque blends the traditions of Neo-Mamluk and the influences of the Ottoman architectural and landscape approaches. The mosque is crowned with an egg-shaped dome on a small pavilion. Next to the mosque is an event hall.

== See also ==
- Islam in Egypt
- List of mosques in Alexandria
- List of mosques in Egypt
