= List of mosques in Alexandria =

This is a list of mosques in Alexandria, Egypt.

After Alexandria fell under Muslim control, it gradually lost its importance since the newly created Empire was not dependent on land and had other ports nearby like Damietta, and Palestinian ports, but nevertheless the city includes several large and important mosques. After Napoleon came in, the city started to regain its power over the nearby port of Rosetta. Alexandria is the second largest in Egypt and one of the most important Mediterranean Sea ports.

== List of mosques ==
Name	Image	Year (CE)	Period	Notes
Attarine Mosque		641	Rashidun	Also spelled as Attarin mosque; established in 370 CE as the St. Athanasius Church, converted to a mosque in 641 CE.
Mosque of Abdul Rahman Bin-Hormuz			Abbasid	
Sheikh Al-Qabari mosque		11th century	Fatimid	
[icon]			Ayyubid	
Mosque of Sidi Gaber			Mamluk	
Nabi Daniel Mosque		13th century	Mamluk	Other claims that the mosque was completed in 1790 CE.
Al-Shatibi mosque			Mamluk	
Al-Tartoushi mosque			Mamluk	
Abu al-Abbas al-Mursi Mosque		1307	Ottoman	Renovated in the 1940s, as designed by Mario Rossi in the Neo-Mamluk style; located in the Anfoushi neighbourhood
Mosque of Ibrahim Terbana		c. 1685	Ottoman	In the El Gomrok neighbourhood
Al-Busiri Mosque		1858	Ottoman	Renovated in the 1940s, as designed by Mario Rossi in the Neo-Mamluk style; located in the Anfoushi neighbourhood
Sidi Bishr Mosque		Late 19th century	Ottoman	Renovated in 1945
Sidi Yaqut Al-Arsh Mosque		1943	Ottoman	Designed by Mario Rossi in the Neo-Mamluk style; located in the Anfoushi neighbourhood
Al-Qaed Ibrahim Mosque		1948	Modern	Designed by Mario Rossi in the Neo-Mamluk style

== See also ==
- Islam in Egypt
- List of mosques in Egypt
