= Abu al-Abbas al-Mursi Mosque =

Mosque in Alexandria, Egypt

- جامع أبو العباس المرسي
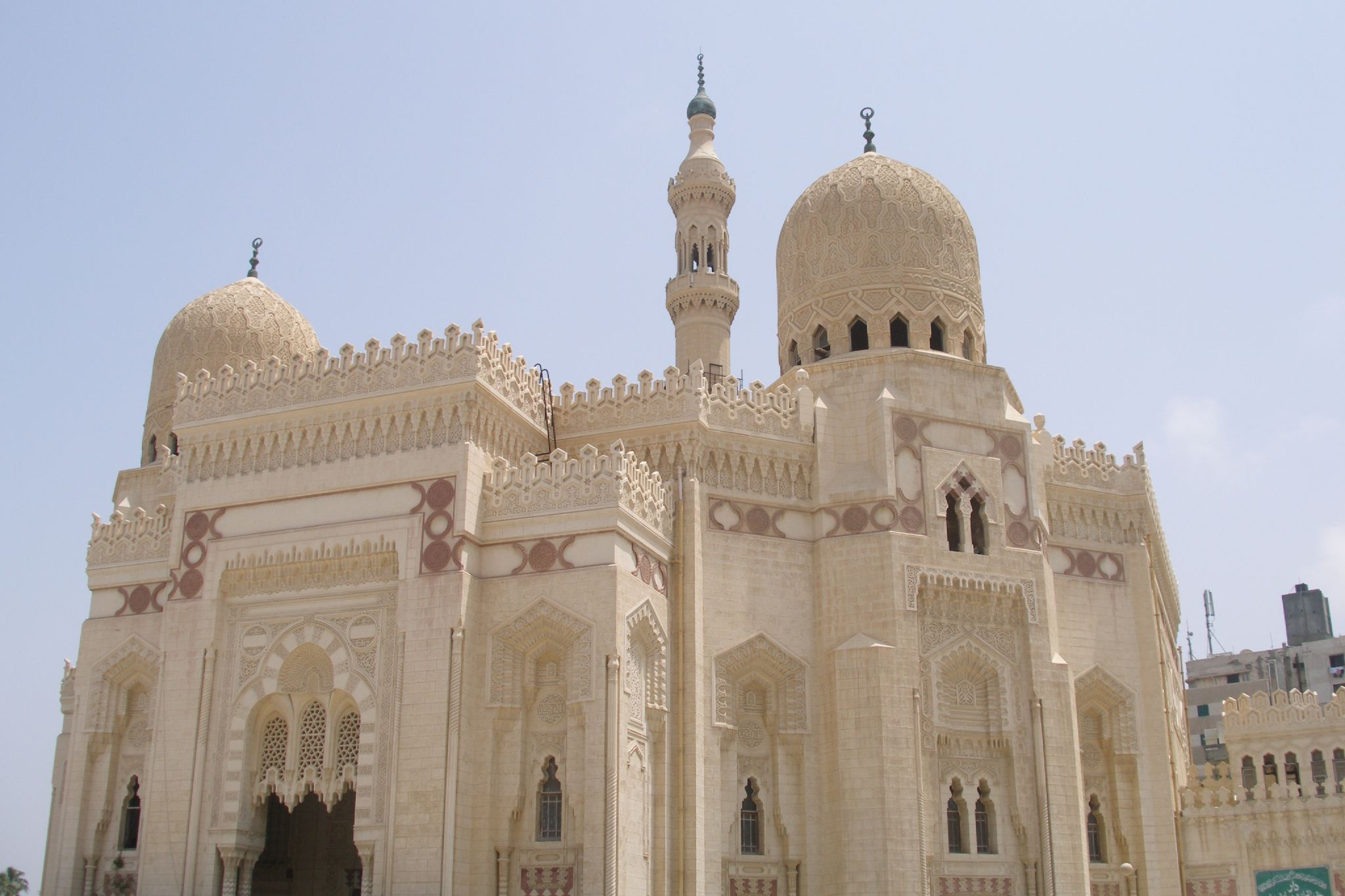

- Location of the mosque in the Nile Delta

Religion
- Affiliation: Sunni Islam
- Rite: Sufism
- Ecclesiastical or organisational status: Mosque; Mausoleum; Shrine
- Status: Active

Location
- Location: Anfoushi, Alexandria
- Country: Egypt
- Coordinates: 31°12′20″N 29°52′56″E

Architecture
- Architects: Mario Rossi (c. 1930s – c. 1940s)
- Type: Mosque
- Style: Neo-Mamluk (original/rebuild)
- Founder: Zain al-Din al-Qattan
- Completed: 1307 CE (original); 1477 CE (rebuild); c. 1943 – c. 1945 (current)

Specifications
- Dome: 5
- Minaret: 2
- Minaret height: 73 m (240 ft)
- Shrines: 4: Abu'l Abbas al-Mursi; Muhammad Salah al-Deen; Muhammad Mas'ud; Muhammad al-Manqa'ee
- Materials: White marble; artificial stone; mosaics; granite; timber; gold

The Abu al-Abbas al-Mursi Mosque (Arabic: جامع أبو العباس المرسي, romanized: Jami' Abu al-'Abbas al-Mursi) is a mosque, mausoleum, and Sufi shrine, located in the Anfoushi neighbourhood of Alexandria, on the north coast of Egypt. The 13th-century mosque is named in honour of Abu'l Abbas al-Mursi, a 13th-century mystic, who is also buried in the same place along with members of the Ashraf family.

The mosque is located adjacent to both the Al-Busiri Mosque and the Sidi Yaqut Al-Arsh Mosque, and all three mosques facing the same central sahn.

== History ==
Abu'l Abbas al-Mursi died in 1286 CE and was buried in a small cemetery within the locality of Bab al-Bahr. Later, a small qubba was built over it, which was developed into a shrine. In 1307, a mosque was built over the shrine, with funding from Zain al-Din al-Qattan, a merchant and Sufi shaykh of Alexandria. The Mamluk emir of Alexandria then rebuilt the mosque in 1477.

In 1934, King Fouad I ordered the construction of a 3,200-square-metre (34,000 sq ft) sahn, to include the mosque-shrines of the Al-Busiri and Yaqut al-Arshy, with the mosque of Abu Al-Abbas Al-Mursi standing in the middle. The building was then renovated and extensively rebuilt. Mario Rossi, an Italian architect, was involved in planning the design and decor of the mosque, and construction took sixteen or eighteen years.

The final structure of the mosque served as a source of inspiration for the much larger Sheikh Zayed Grand Mosque in Abu Dhabi, which was finally completed in 2007 after more than a decade of building work.

== Architecture ==
The current mosque, particularly its exterior, is designed in a Neo-Mamluk style, inspired by late Mamluk architecture in particular.

The mosque interior is approximately 22 to 26 metres (72 to 85 ft) tall, and the floors are covered with white marble. Its walls are made of a combination of artificial stone and mosaic. Several Arabic inscriptions, arabesque interlacing, mosaics, mashrabiyas, and ventilation openings that surround the mosque from all directions are present on the interior of the roof.

The pillars of the mosque are made of granite, with four of them being made from harder granite that was designed in Italy to support the heavy dome. A bronze chandelier hangs from the ceiling as well. The minbar is made of both teak and walnut. The top of this minbar has verses from the Holy Qur'an, which are written in French gold. The mihrab is encased in a marble frame decorated with a mosaic with the inscription of the Shahadah on it. The prayer hall for women is on the western section of the mosque. Towards the end of the mosque is the tomb of Abu'l Abbas al-Mursi and three of his disciples. The tombs of three mystics from the Ashraf family, Muhammad Salah al-Deen, Muhammad Mas'ud and Muhammad al-Manqa'ee are within the building as well.

A large dome tops the mosque, followed by four smaller domes meant to represent the saint and his disciples. The mosque's minaret is approximately 73 metres (240 ft) high. The mosque as a whole rises approximately three metres (9.8 ft) above the level of its surroundings, which was said to be a strategic move against air raids during wartime.

== Gallery ==
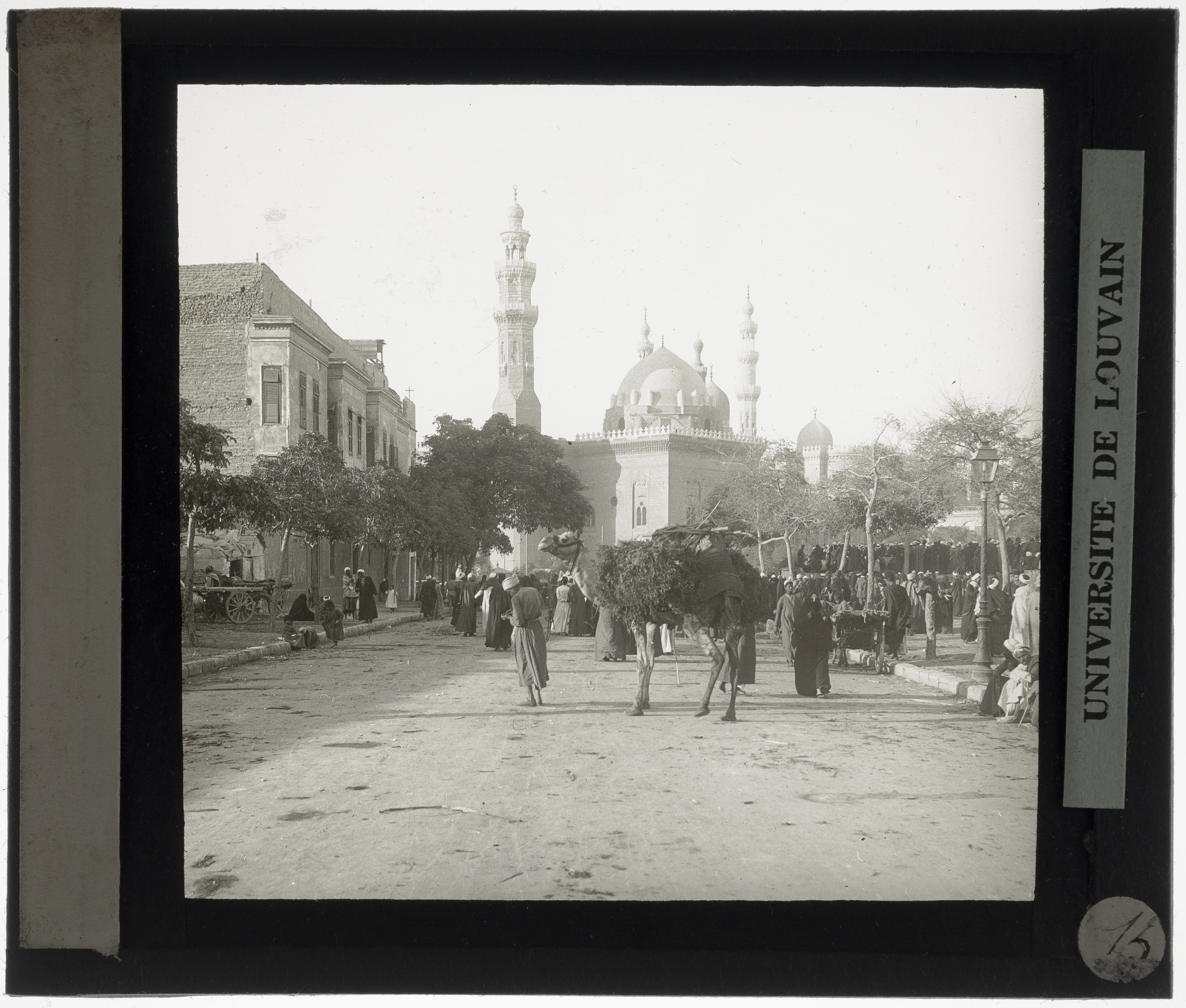
Undated slide of the mosque

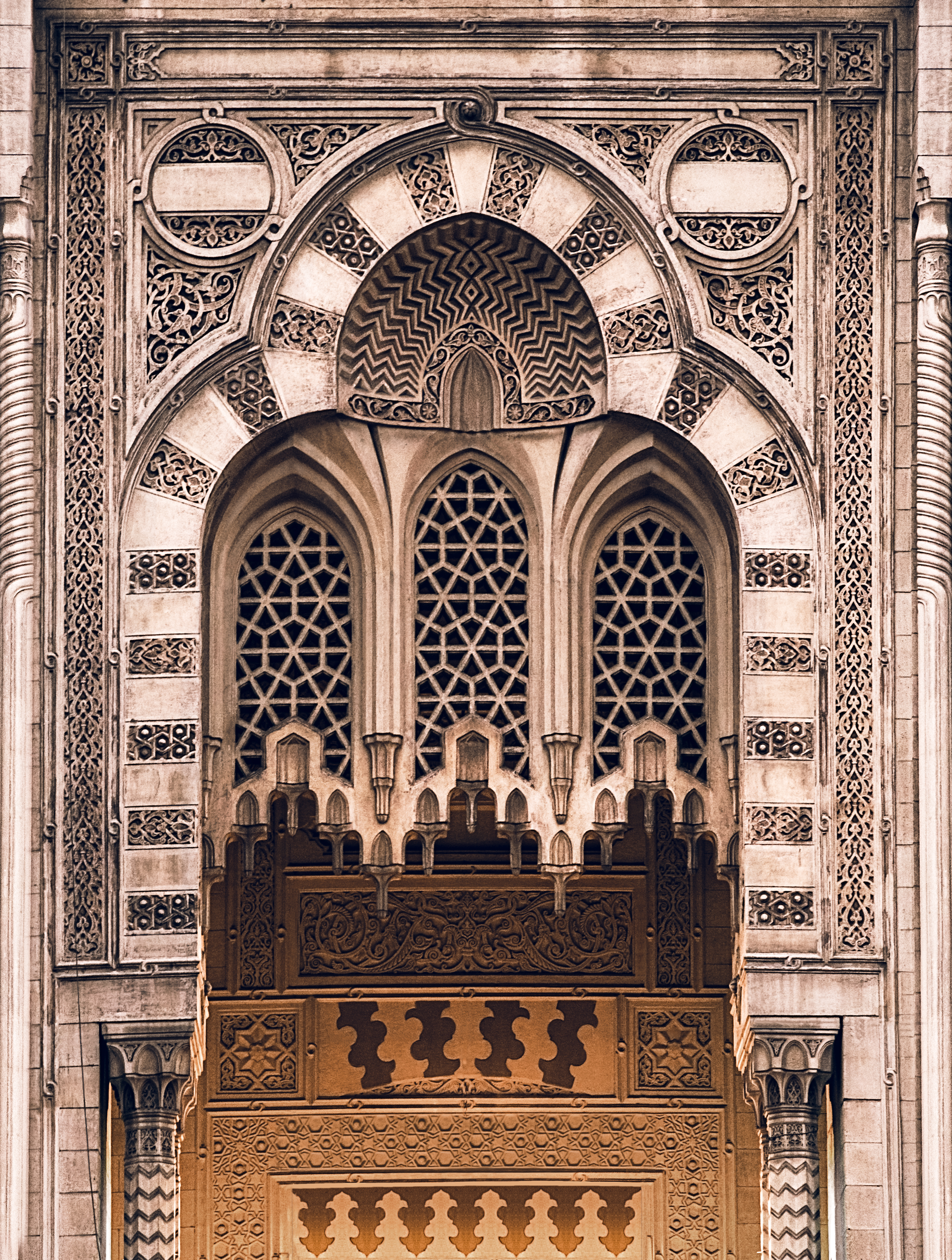
Detail of the mosque, 2017

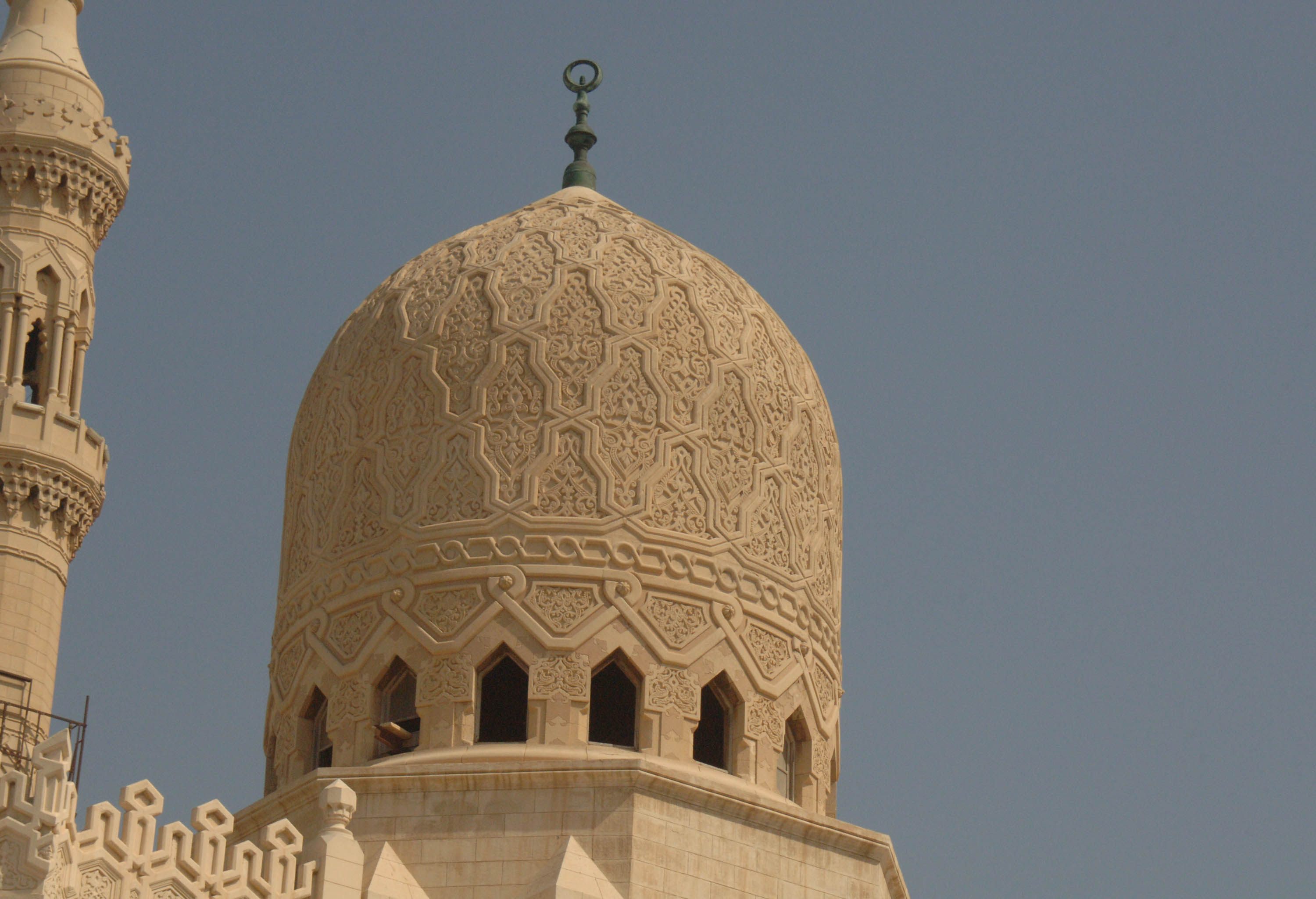
Close-up image of one of a dome, 2007

== See also ==
- Islam in Egypt
- List of mosques in Alexandria
- List of mosques in Egypt
