= Attarine Mosque =

Mosque in Alexandria, Egypt

- مسجد العطارين
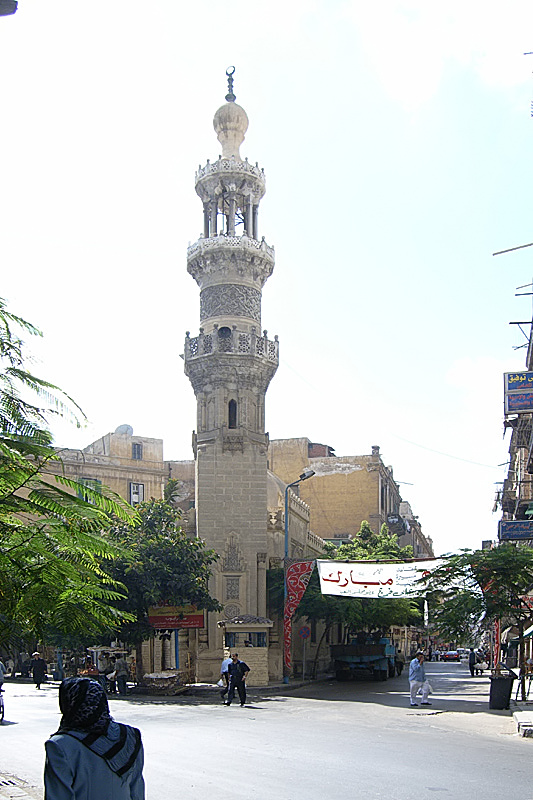
- The mosque minaret, from Attarine Street

- Location of the mosque in the Nile Delta

Religion
- Affiliation: Sunni Islam
- Ecclesiastical or organizational status: Mosque (since 641 CE); Mausoleum
- Status: Active
- Removed features: Sarcophagus of Nectanebo II (removed in 1802)

Location
- Location: Alexandria
- Country: Egypt
- Interactive map of Attarine Mosque
- Coordinates: 31°11′42″N 29°53′52″E

Architecture
- Type: Church (370–641 CE); Mosque (current)
- Style: Ottoman; Mamluk
- Established: 370 CE (church); 641 CE (mosque)
- Completed: 370 CE (church); 1912 CE (mosque)

Specifications
- Dome: 1
- Minaret: 1
- Shrine: 1: Muhammad ibn Sulayman
- Materials: Stone; marble; plaster; bricks

The Attarine Mosque (Arabic: مسجد العطارين), also known as the Al-Juyushi Mosque (Arabic: الجامع الجيوشى) is a mosque located in Alexandria, on the north coast of Egypt. The mosque was built on the site of a former church that was dedicated to Athanasius of Alexandria, and subsequently re-dedicated to Saint Sabbas. The present structure of the mosque dates from the early 20th century, and much of its original foundation has been lost, save for an inscription on a stone which commemorates Badr al-Jamali, one of the renovators of the mosque.

== History ==
In 370 CE Saint Athanasius consecrated the Church of Bendideion (Ancient Greek: Βενδιδείων) on the site of the former temple of Bendis, in the northern part of the Canopic Street. In the 7th century, monks began building cells around an ancient church, laying the foundation for a monastery in the area. This initial monastery was destroyed by an earthquake, and was later rebuilt by a wealthy man, who dedicated it to Saint Sabbas, the Sanctified.

On 8 November 641 CE, Alexandria fell into Muslim control by the Rashidun Caliph, Umar after a 14-month siege under the leadership of Amr ibn al-As when the Byzantine Empire surrendered the city to the Muslims. The church was converted into a mosque. Over time, the mosque was abandoned and became ruined. During the Fatimid era, the mosque was fully restored under the guidance of the Fatimid vizier Badr al-Jamali who funded the restoration using taxes imposed on the people of Alexandria. During the reign of Mamluk Sultan Al-Nasir Muhammad, the mosque was used as a congregational mosque, and the Friday prayers were performed there. But after his death, the mosque became neglected until the rule of Khedive Abbas II of Egypt who ordered his men to plan a restoration. The mosque was fully rebuilt from the ground up, and such a structure remains until this day.

== Architecture ==
The plan of the Attarine Mosque is rectangular in shape. The mosque has two floors, the one on ground level is for men. In the middle of the courtyard are four stone pillars, which are united with two columns made of marble. The mosque has a skylight with four plaster window openings on each side. Below the ceiling of the middle part is inscribed calligraphy of several verses from Surah al-Fatihah. The southern part of the mosque has several shops incorporated into it, and proceeds from the shops are used to fund the mosque's repairs. The mosque has a single minaret made from brick.

In the eastern part of the mosque, accessible from the eastern entrance, is a small mausoleum dedicated to a local patron saint, Muhammad ibn Sulayman, who is the grandson of the famed military commander, Khalid ibn al-Walid. The construction of the mausoleum dates from the reign of Khedive Abbas II.

== Archeological finds ==
During the Napoleonic rule of Egypt, a stone sarcophagus was found in the mosque sahn; later discovered to be that of Nectanebo II, the last native Egyptian Pharaoh. Nectanebo II is not buried inside the mosque as he had already fled from the Persians before their conquest of Egypt. During Islamic rule, the sarcophagus was used as a wudu, and twelve holes were drilled into it for draining. The sarcophagus has been located in the British Museum since 1802.

== Gallery ==
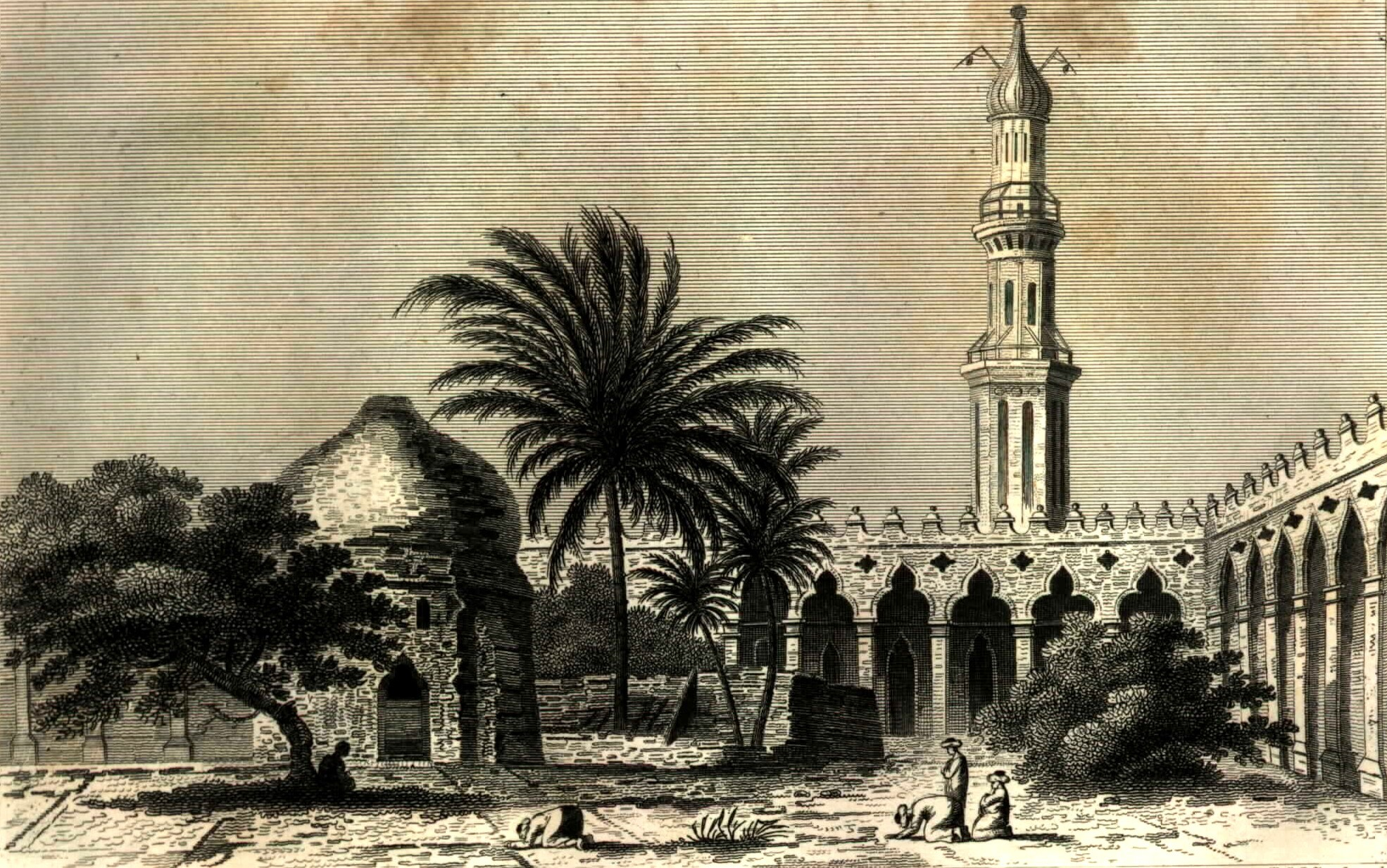
18th-century illustration of the mosque by Vivant Denon

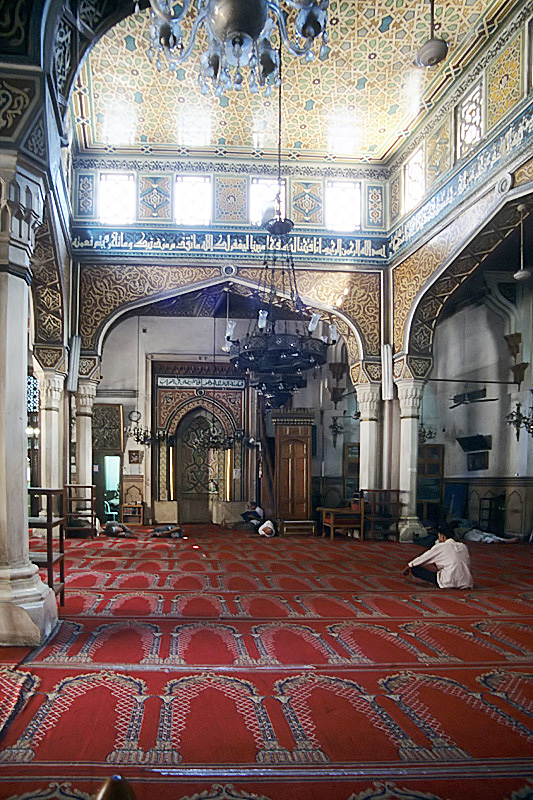
Inside the prayer hall

== See also ==
- Islam in Egypt
- List of mosques in Alexandria
- List of mosques in Egypt
