= Abu al-Abbas al-Mursi =

Andalusian Sufi saint (1219–1287)

Al-Mursi Abu'l-'Abbas (1219 in Murcia – 1287 CE) (Arabic: أبو العباس المرسي) was a saint from Al-Andalus during the Nasrid period and who later in his life moved to Alexandria in Egypt. His complete name is Shahab al-Din Abu'l-'Abbas Ahmad ibn 'Umar ibn Mohammad al-Ansari al-Mursi. Al-Mursi Abul-'Abbas, as he is now commonly called, is one of the four master saints of Egypt, the other three being Ahmad al-Badawi, al-Dessouqi and al-Haggag. His legacy and reverence in Egypt were such that Mursi became a common name in the country.

== In al-Andalus ==
Shahab was born in Murcia in al-Andalus, in 616 H (1219 CE) to a wealthy family in the trading business and was well educated in religious sciences.

He grew up helping his father in the trading business. He was known for his honesty and for his many contributions to the needy. He left Spain with his family in 640 H (1242 CE) in the face of increasing Christian control over Spain. He was accompanied by his father, brother, and his mother. However, his parents did not make it to Tunisia, their destination.

== Meeting al-Shadhili ==
In Tunisia, Shahab heard about Shaykh Abu’l-Hassan ash-Shadhili, founder of the Shadhiliyya Sufi brotherhood, and he accompanied him when the latter moved to Alexandria in Egypt. Many Muslim scholars from Spain chose to live in Alexandria as Muslim Spain gradually fell under the domination of hostile Christian forces. Al-Shadhili was fond of Shahab who was becoming one of his best students. Abu'l-'Abbas al-Mursi (the Murcian) - as Shahab became known in Alexandria - married al Shadhili's daughter and had two daughters and a son from her. He lived 43 years in Alexandria as a Muslim teacher until he died in 686 H (1287 AD).

== Meeting Ibn 'Ata' Allah ==
As a young man Ibn ‘Ata’ Allah did not hold this view, and only later came to see Sufism as being integral to Islam. Ibn 'Ata' Allah's early opposition to Sufism manifested itself in arguments with the students of Abu’l ‘Abbas al-Mursi. This was until 674 AH/1276 CE when Ibn ‘Ata’ Allah attended a public lecture given by Abu’l ‘Abbas al-Mursi, whereupon he changed from an opponent to Sufism to one of Abu’l ‘Abbas al-Mursi’s most serious and promising students. This change of heart came as a result of Abu’l Abbas’ knowledge of Islamic jurisprudence (fiqh) which forced Ibn ‘Ata’ Allah to reassess the judgement of his fellow students.

== His mosque in Alexandria ==
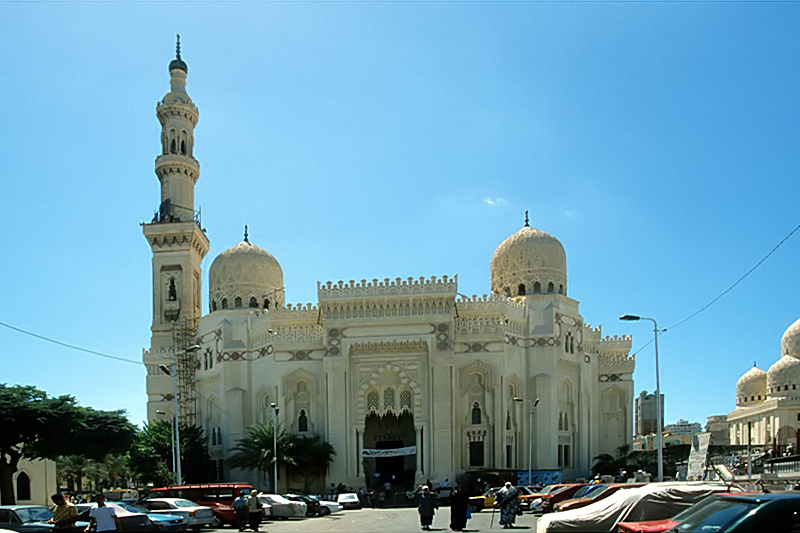
El-Mursi Abul Abbas Mosque

A mosque was built over his tomb in the Anfoushi district of Alexandria, which over time became the most famous of all of Alexandria's mosques, the El-Mursi Abul Abbas Mosque.

== Bibliography ==
- D. M. Dunlop, "A Spanish Muslim Saint: Abul-'Abbas al-Mursi", in: The Muslim World, Volume 35 Issue 3, P. 181 - 196
- Ibn Ata Allah al-Iskandari, The Subtle Blessings in the Saintly Lives of Abul Al-Abbas Al-Mursi & His Master Abu Al-Hasan Al-Shadhili, translated by Nancy Roberts, ed. Fons Vitae, 2005 ISBN 978-1-887752-61-9
- Hizb Abul 'Abbas al Mursi: "The Litany of Abul 'Abbas al Mursi", in: Awrad Book- English Invocations of the Shadhili Order, compiled by Shaykh Nuh Ha Mim Keller Cairo, Egypt 2006 p. 59;
