= Augusto Anfossi =

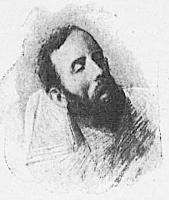
Augusto Anfossi

Augusto Anfossi (born 1802 in Nice; died 21 March 1848 in Milan)

Born in Nice, Kingdom of Sardinia, he received a Jesuit education. He disliked his education so much that he attacked his teachers, with the consequence of being exiled to France. There he served in the French Army but returned to Piedmont after the accession of Charles Albert, only to be exiled again in 1831. He joined the Egyptian cause against the Turks, but the movements in 1848 Italy caused his return to Milan.

During the Five Days of Milan, Anfossi was in personal command for the fight of Porta Nuova, and was victorious. On 21 March, the fourth day of the revolt, he was mortally wounded and replaced by Luciano Manara.
