= Mario Rossi (architect) =

Italian architect (1897–1961)

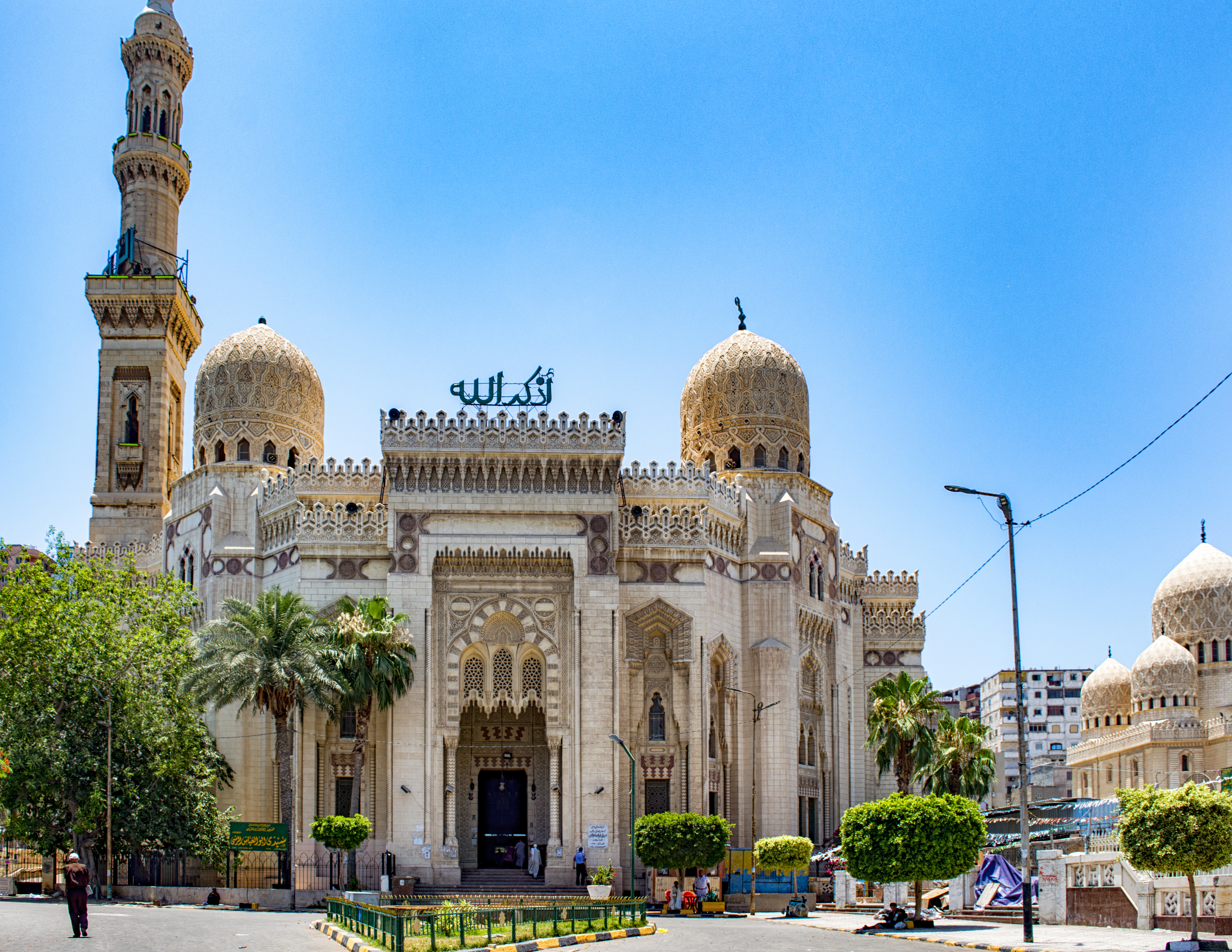
Abu al-Abbas al-Mursi Mosque, Alexandria

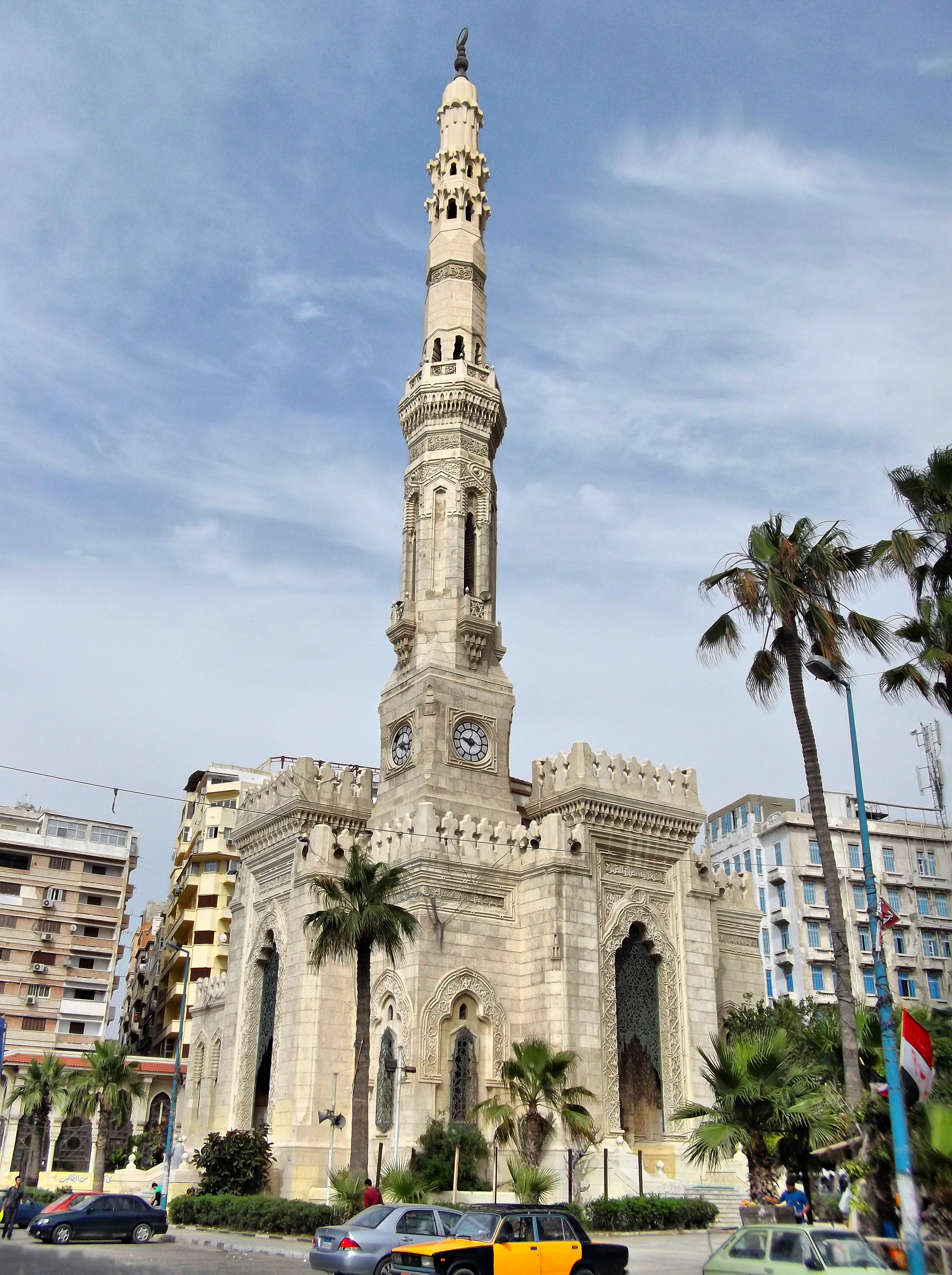
Al-Qaed Ibrahim Mosque, Alexandria

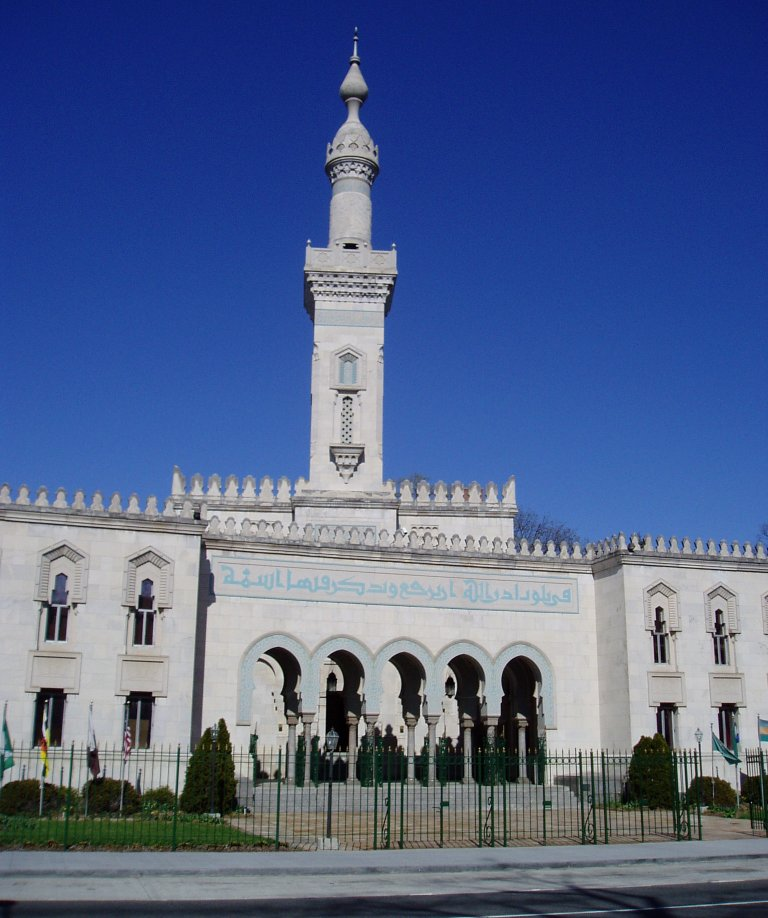
Islamic Center of Washington

Mario Rossi (1897-1961) was an Italian architect and notable contributor to 20th-century Islamic architecture.

== Life ==
Rossi was born in Rome and studied architecture at the Accademia di Belle Arti di Roma, from which he graduated in 1917. He moved to Egypt in 1921 as an assistant decorator, invited by Ernesto Verrucci-Bey, who was Chief Court Architect of Sultan (later King) Fuad, in charge of improvements at Abdeen Palace. He then worked for Egyptian Public Works, for Verrucci's successor Moustafa Fahmy, and with Antonio Lasciac on projects that included interior design, mansions, apartment buildings and mausoleums for a wealthy clientele.

In 1929, despite being a Catholic, he won the competition to become the Chief Architect of the Waqf Administration. In this capacity, he designed a number of mosques and religious building between 1929 and 1941, most prominently in Alexandria. He also worked on the restoration of older monuments, including the Mosque of Muhammad Ali and the Al-Rifa'i Mosque in Cairo.

Like thousands of other Italian Egyptians, he was dismissed and expropriated during World War II at the initiative of the British authorities, and interned between 1941 and 1944 at Camp Fayed in the Suez Canal Zone. In 1946 he converted to Islam, and in that period again worked for the Waqf Administration, now as an external consultant. He also designed the Islamic Center of Washington. From 1954 to 1960 he worked in Saudi Arabia on the decoration of the Masjid al-Haram in Mecca. He died in Cairo in 1961.

He and his wife Rosa had a son, Alessandro.

== Works ==
Rossi's architecture was based on careful study of ancient Islamic buildings in Egypt and beyond, particularly those from the Fatimid and Mamluk periods.

=== In Greater Cairo ===
- Villa Tawfiq, Zamalek (with Ernesto Verrucci-Bey), now Helwan University Faculty of Music
- Two villas for the children of Ahmed Afifi Pasha, Giza, 1920s
- El Gabaleya apartment building, Zamalek
- Gaston Weiser apartment building, Garden City
- Villa Assem, Zamalek
- Votive church of the Syriac Catholic Cemetery, Abbassia
- Villa Hassan Sabry, Zamalek
- Italian World War I Memorial, Latin Cemetery, Abbassia
- Villa George Wissa, Garden City, 1930s
- Al-Tabbakh Mosque, near Mohamed Naguib Metro station, 1929-1933
- Umar Makram Mosque on Tahrir Square, 1948-1954
- Zamalek Mosque, Zamalek, 1953-1955

=== Elsewhere in Egypt ===
- Abu al-Abbas al-Mursi Mosque, Alexandria (with Eugenio Valzania), 1929–45
- Islamic Center, Asyut, 1930
- Fouly Mosque, Minya, 1945–46
- Abderrahim al-Qenawi Mosque, Qena, 1949
- Al-Qaed Ibrahim Mosque, Mahatet El Raml, Alexandria, 1948–51
- Muhammad Kurayyim Mosque near Ras El Tin Palace, Alexandria, 1949–53
- Ahmed Pasha Yehia Mosque, Alexandria.
- Villa Ahmed Bey Niazi, Schutz, Alexandria.

=== Outside Egypt ===
- Islamic Center of Washington, Washington DC, 1949–57

== Influence ==
Rossi influenced a younger generation of Egyptian architects, such as Ali Thabit and Ali Khayrat who designed the Salah al-Din Mosque in El Manial, Cairo (1959).

His Abu al-Abbas al-Mursi Mosque in Alexandria was a key source of inspiration for the Sheikh Zayed Grand Mosque in Abu Dhabi, designed by architect Yusef Abdelki and built between 1996 and 2007.
