= Mahatet El Raml =

Mahatet El Raml محطة الرمل
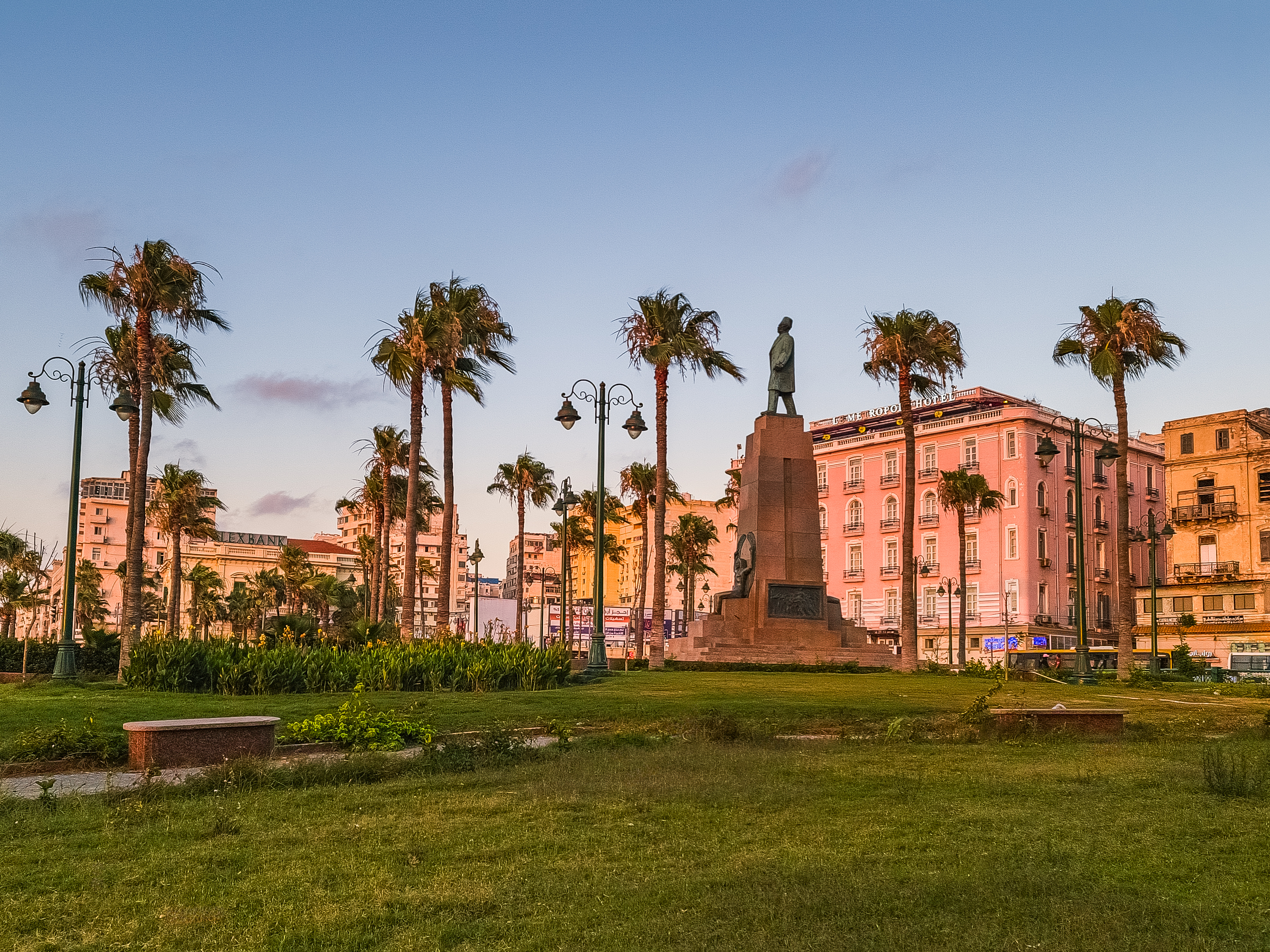

- Location in Egypt
- Coordinates: 31.201459°N 29.901005°E
- Country: Egypt
- Governorate: Alexandria
- City: Alexandria
- Time zone: UTC+2 (EET)
  - Summer (DST): UTC+3 (EEST)

Mahatet El Raml (Arabic: محطة الرمل) is a neighborhood in Alexandria, Egypt. It features a large public square containing the main station of the Alexandria tramways. It is one of the main centers for tourism, retail, and entertainment in the city.

== Overview ==
One of the defining features of Mahatet El Raml is the specialization of vendors along certain streets (e.g. sellers of electrical and electronic equipment congregate in Nabi Danial Street). These vendors also attract tourists, helped by the presence of several hotels, including international chains such as Sofitel, restaurants, and entertainment venues.

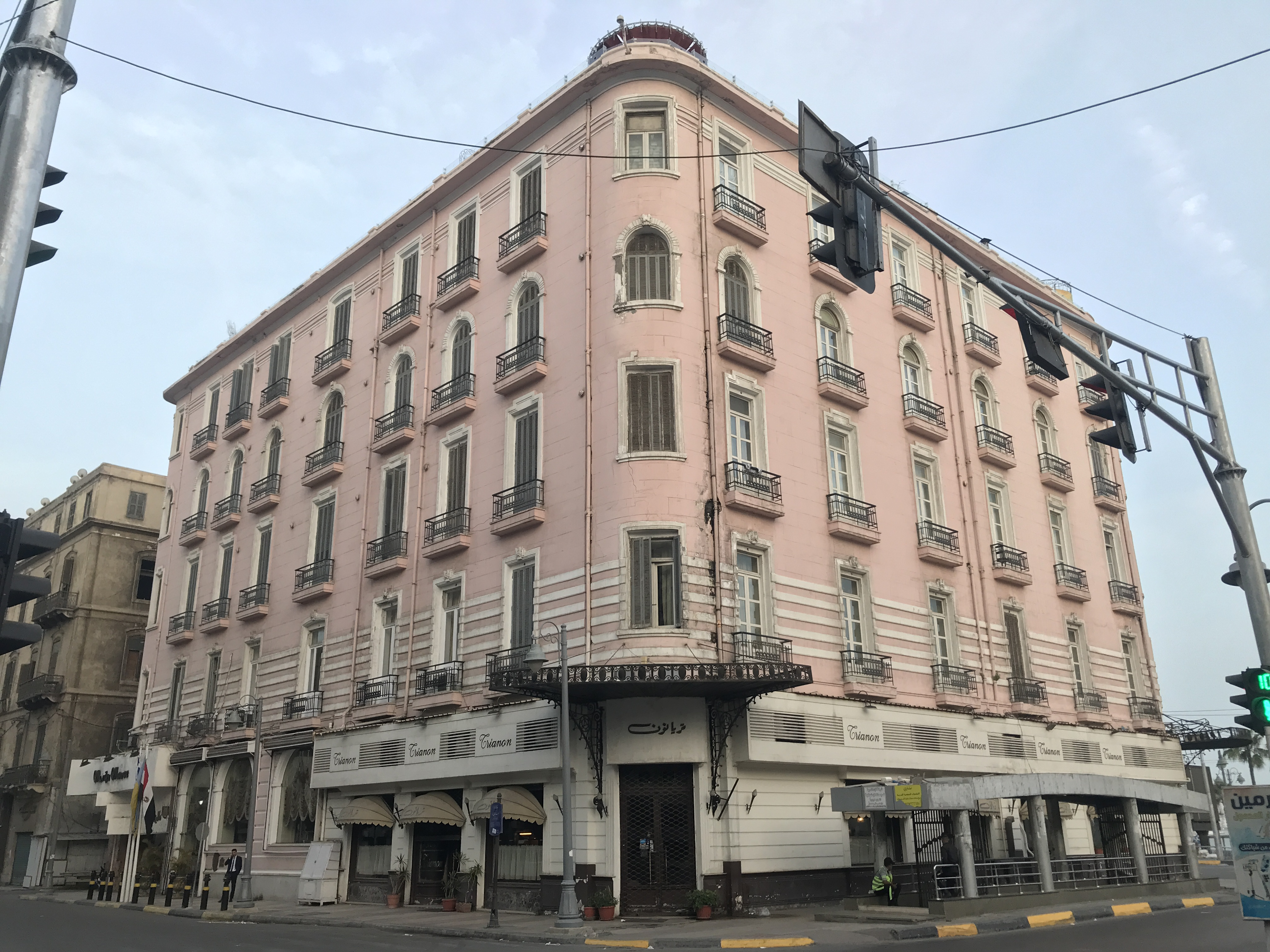
Le Metropole Hotel

The Alexandria Opera House and Alexandria Creativity Center, venues for traditional and non-traditional performing arts respectively, are also located in the neighborhood.

Parts of Mahatet El Raml include the ancient Baucalis section of Alexandria, where it is home to the Saint Mark’s Coptic Orthodox Cathedral, built on the site of a church originally founded by Saint Mark. Baucalis is also where he was martyred.

== Gallery ==
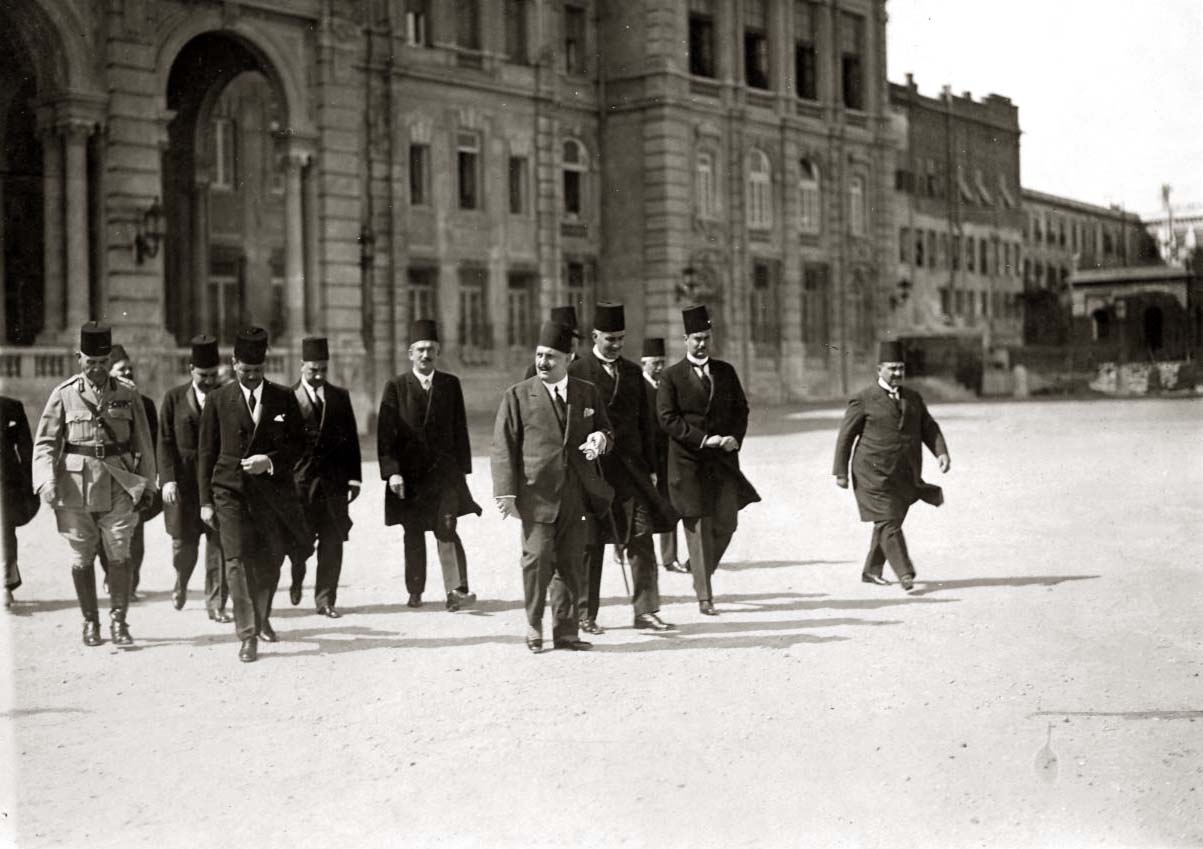
King Fuad I in Mahatet El Raml

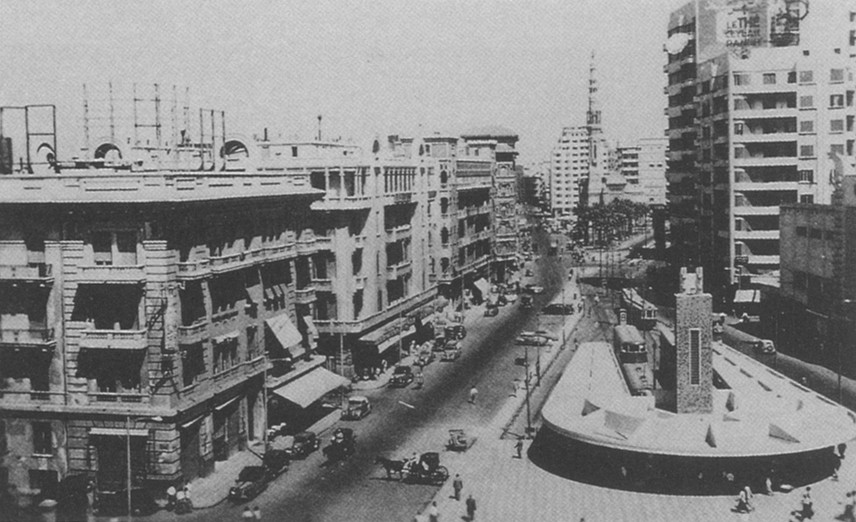
Mahatet El Raml Square in the 1950s

== See also ==
- Neighborhoods in Alexandria
