= Anfoushi =

Neighborhood in Alexandria, Egypt

Coordinates: 31.2025°N 29.8785°E

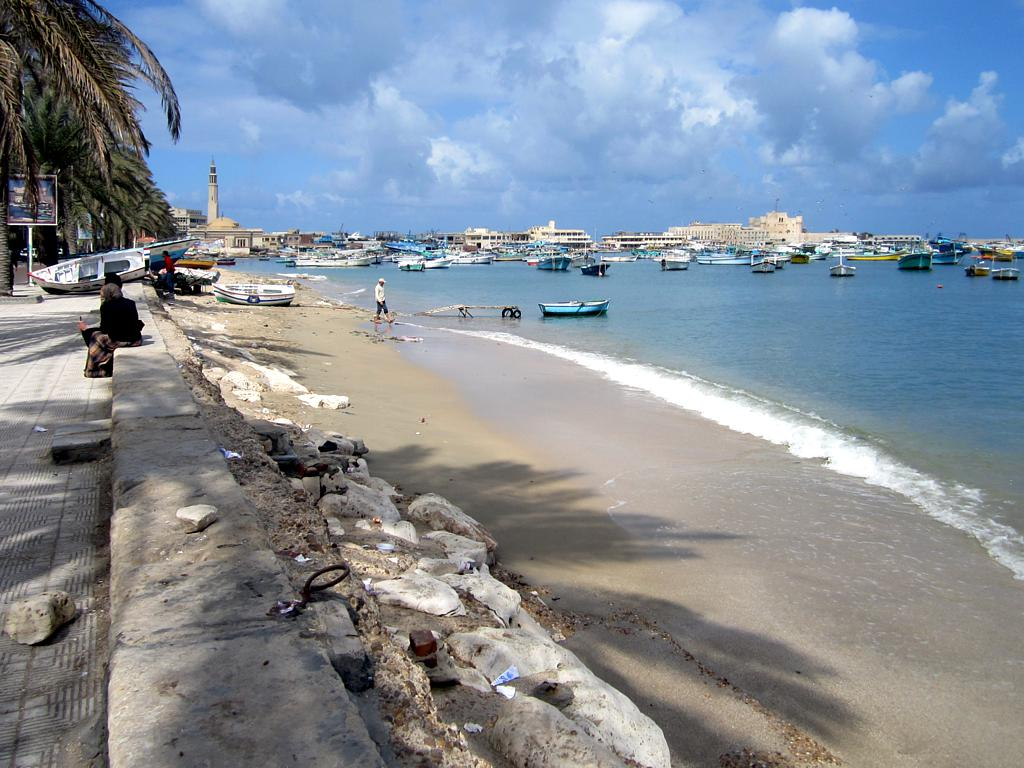
Panorama of Anfoushi

Anfoushi (Arabic: الأنفوشي) is a neighborhood in Alexandria, Egypt. It is located on the ancient Pharos peninsula and is considered one of the oldest neighbourhoods in the city and is home to many old landmarks, including the famous Abu el-Abbas el-Mursi Mosque and the Citadel of Qaitbay. The neighbourhood is probably named after Augusto Anfossi, an artillery instructor under Muhammad Ali and later a colonel.

The neighborhood also contains the Anfushi tombs, which were discovered in 1901 and include five tombs dating back to the Ptolemaic era and the beginning of the Roman era.

== Gallery ==
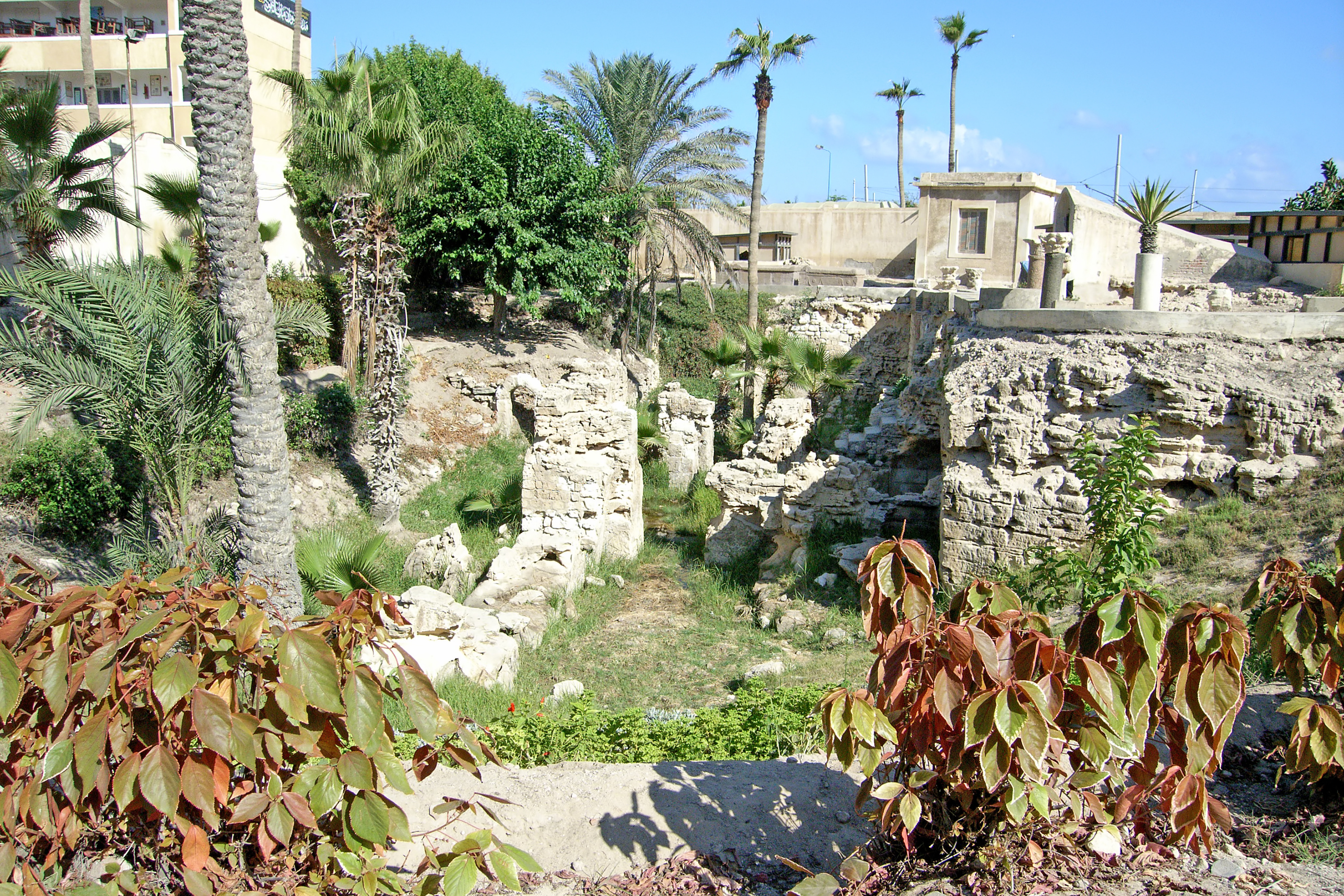
Tombs of Anfushi

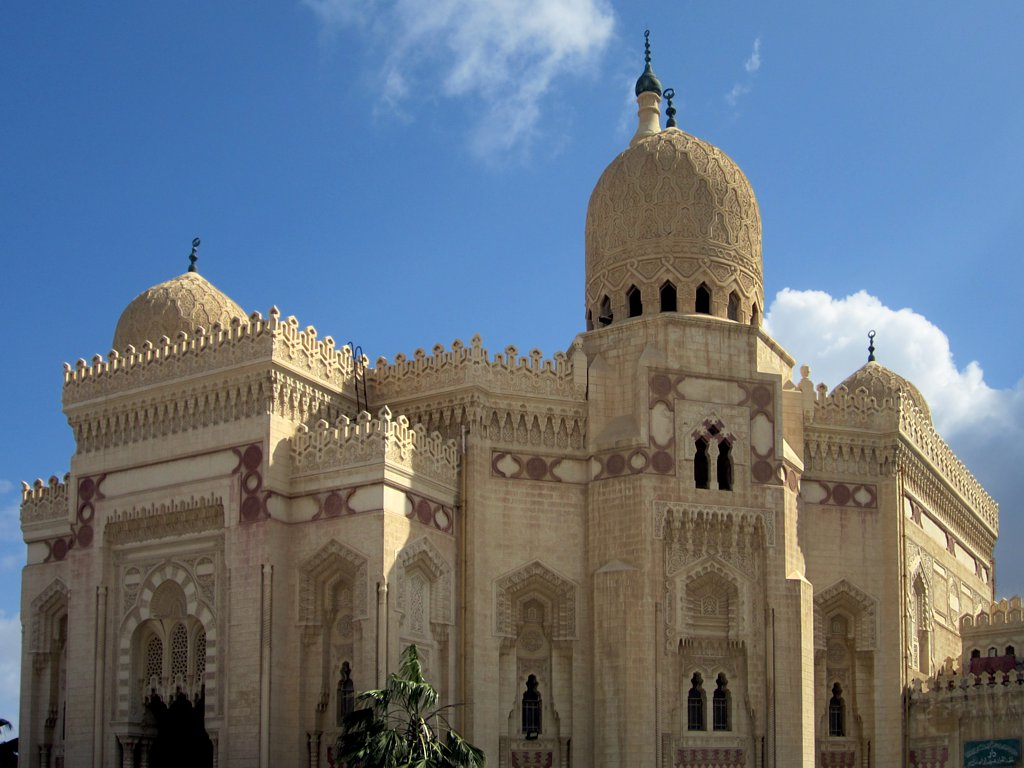
Abu al-Abbas al-Mursi Mosque

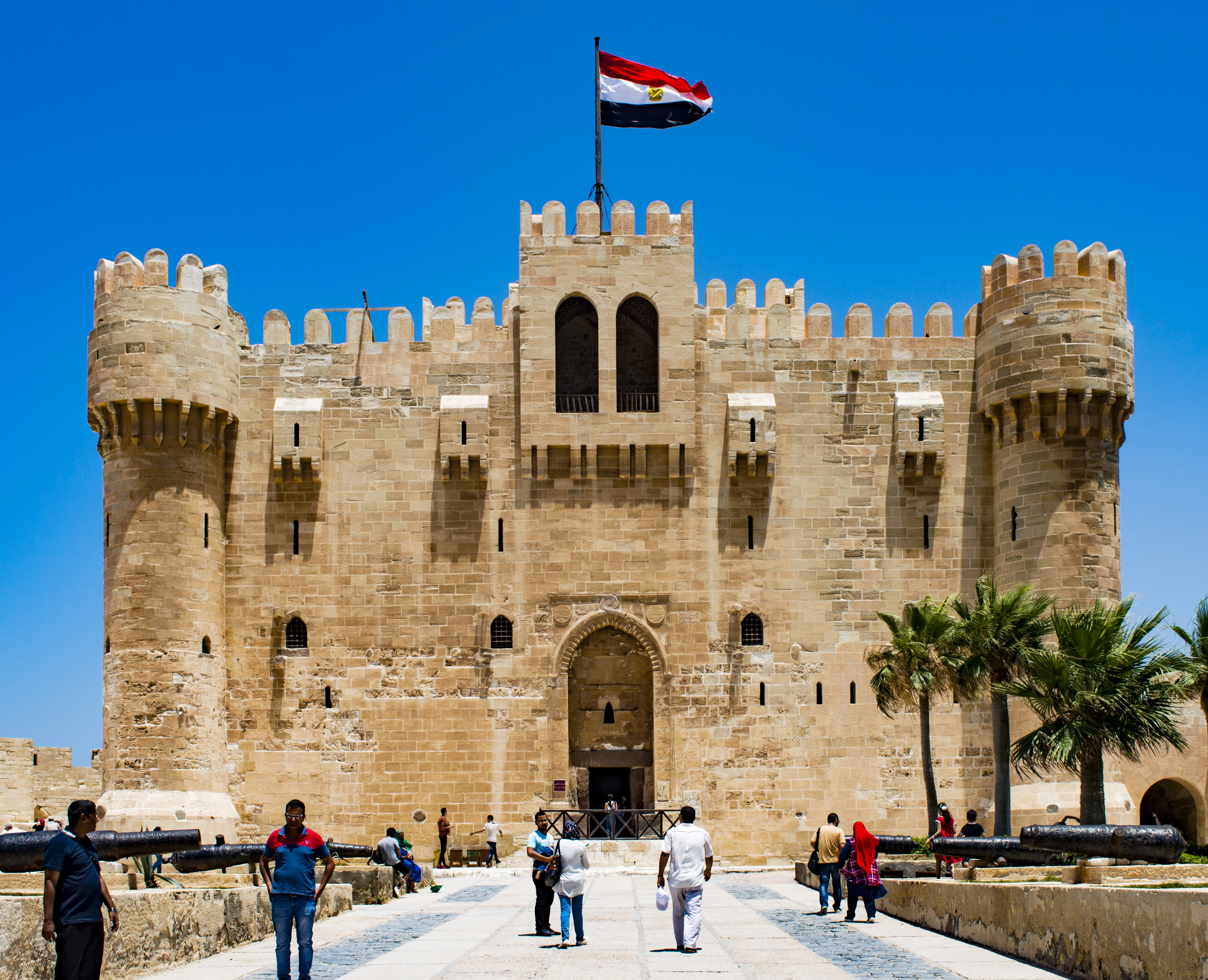
Citadel of Qaitbay

== See also ==
- Media related to Anfushi tombs at Wikimedia Commons
