= Neo-Mamluk architecture =

Building style in Egypt from late 19th to 20th centuries

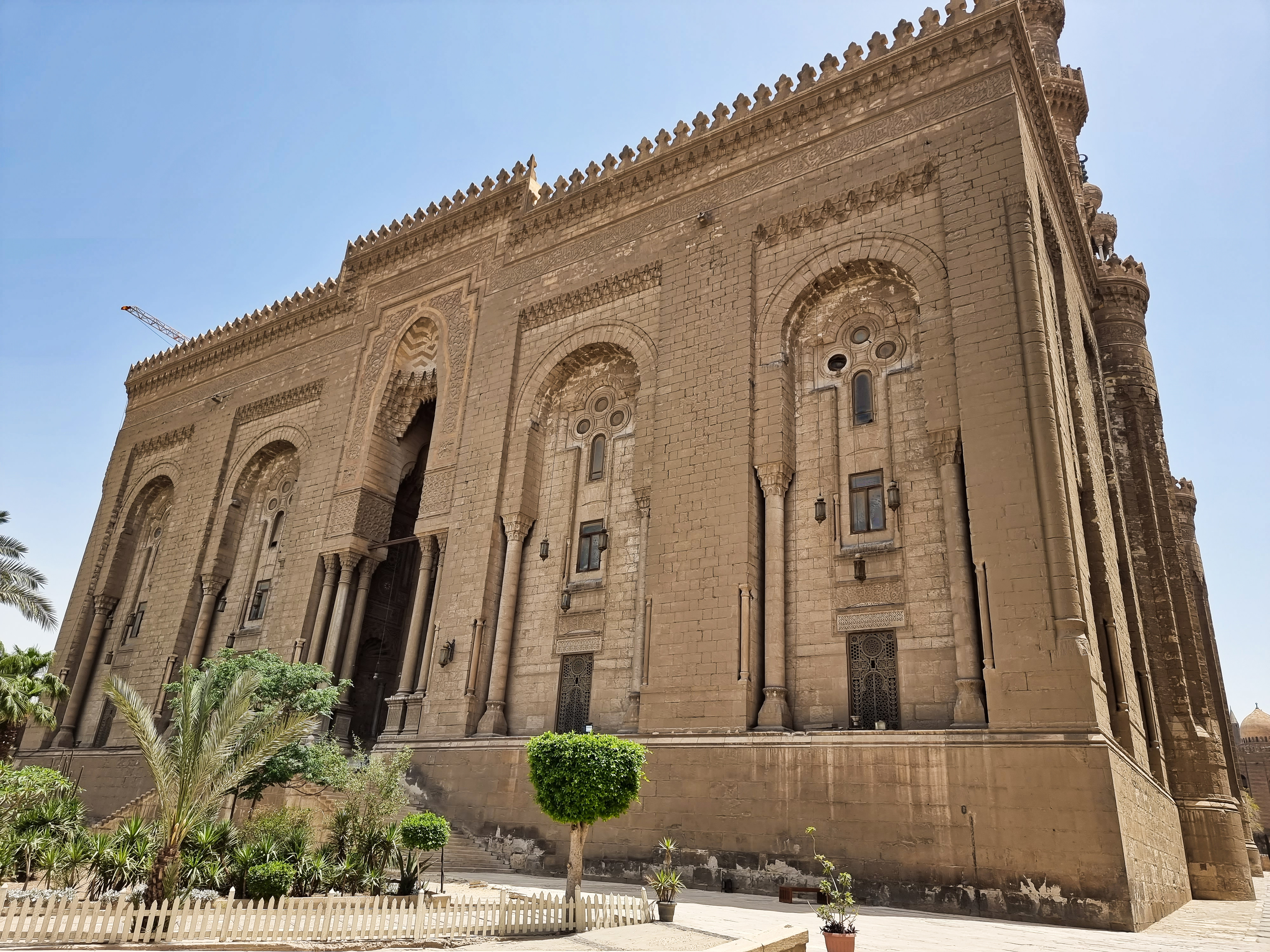
The Al-Rifa'i Mosque in Cairo, a major example of Neo-Mamluk architecture. It was begun in 1869 by Egyptian architect Husayn Fahmi Pasha and completed in 1911 by Hungarian architect Max Herz.

Neo-Mamluk architecture or Mamluk revival architecture is an architectural style that was popular mainly in Egypt in the late 19th century and early 20th century. It combined the principles of modern European architecture at the time with stylistic elements of historic Mamluk architecture in Egypt. It was employed in the design of various government buildings, mosques, and residential buildings of this era.

== Historical background ==
The historic Mamluk architectural style developed under the Mamluk Sultanate from 1250 to 1517. After the sultanate's conquest by the Ottoman Empire in 1517, the traditional Mamluk style continued to be employed in Cairo, though it was often combined to some degree with Ottoman architectural elements.

The idea of a Neo-Mamluk construction style was contemplated in the early 19th century after the invasion of Napoleon, which brought with it a systematic documentation of Egyptian historical monuments (later published as the Description de l'Égypte). Muhammad Ali, the new ruler of Egypt (r. 1805–1848) who gained autonomy from the Ottoman Empire, hired French architect Pascal Coste as his chief engineer from 1818 to 1827 and commissioned him to design his new mosque in the Citadel of Cairo. Coste proposed a Neo-Mamluk design for the mosque, the earliest documented example of this idea. He thought it would be an appropriate "national style" for Egypt, but Muhammad Ali did not accept the design. After Coste departed, the mosque was instead completed by another architect in an Ottoman style with European influences.

A new Mamluk revival style eventually came into vogue in the late 19th century and was mainly prominent between 1870 and 1930. This coincided with a period of major political and social changes in Egypt, including the imposition of British rule from 1882 onward. Several factors led to its emergence. It was likely, in part, a reaction to centuries of Ottoman control and to the rise of European influence in Egypt at the time. It was also an indirect expression of the beginnings of modern Egyptian nationalism, spurred by the political developments of the 19th century during which Muhammad Ali and his dynastic successors sought to establish Egypt's de facto independence from the Ottoman Empire. Muhammad Ali had previously made efforts to break away from Egypt's Mamluk past and consciously chose to emulate Ottoman architecture – both from its classical period and in its more recent Baroque period – over Mamluk architecture for his construction projects (like his mosque in the Citadel). However, his later successors, who pushed Egyptian independence further, moved away from the Ottoman style. The Mamluk Sultanate was a period of political dominance and prosperity in the history of Egypt and the surrounding region, thus its architectural style was a logical choice for revival in this context. Another factor was the awareness, by both local Egyptians and new European settlers alike, that the traditional Mamluk style of building and the craftsmanship associated with it were disappearing and thus in need of preservation. Europeans of the era were also interested in historicist styles in art and architecture, including neo-Pharaonic and Islamic or Orientalist styles; accordingly, the new European arrivals found inspiration in the large number of medieval Islamic (Mamluk) buildings still standing in Egypt. This trend was helped in turn by the creation of the Comité de Conservation des Monuments de l'Art Arabe (typically referred to as the Comité), a body which spearheaded the documentation, conservation, and restoration of Egypt's Islamic-era heritage, further enabling a revival of the Mamluk style.

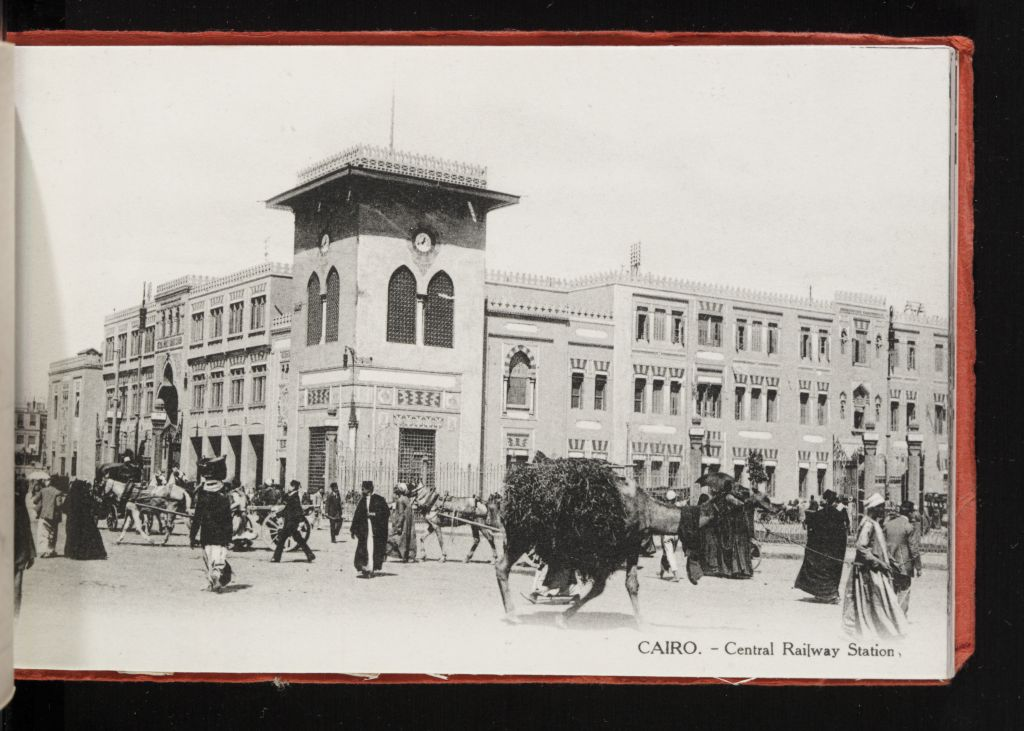
Cairo Railway Station (photo circa 1900), rebuilt in Neo-Mamluk style from 1891 to 1893

The Neo-Mamluk style that emerged in the late 19th century was pioneered in part by Egyptian architect Husayn Fahmi Pasha, who was commissioned by Princess Hoshiyar to design the al-Rifa'i Mosque in 1869 (though not completed until 1911). The princess is said to have specifically requested that the new mosque be built in a Mamluk revivalist style. It quickly became a national style that was associated with the construction projects of the royal family. At the time, it was typically referred to as "Arab style". The architects who built in this style included both Europeans and local Egyptians.

Building activity in this style was promoted in part by the Egyptian Ministry of Awqaf (religious endowements). The ministry's construction and restoration projects were particularly numerous from 1884 to 1913, when it was able to operate independently from the British colonial administration, and especially during the reign of Abbas Hilmi (r. 1892–1914). A report by Egyptian architect Saber Sabri, who was chief engineer for the ministry from 1892 to 1906, indicates that most of the new buildings during his tenure were in the Neo-Mamluk style.

== Characteristics ==
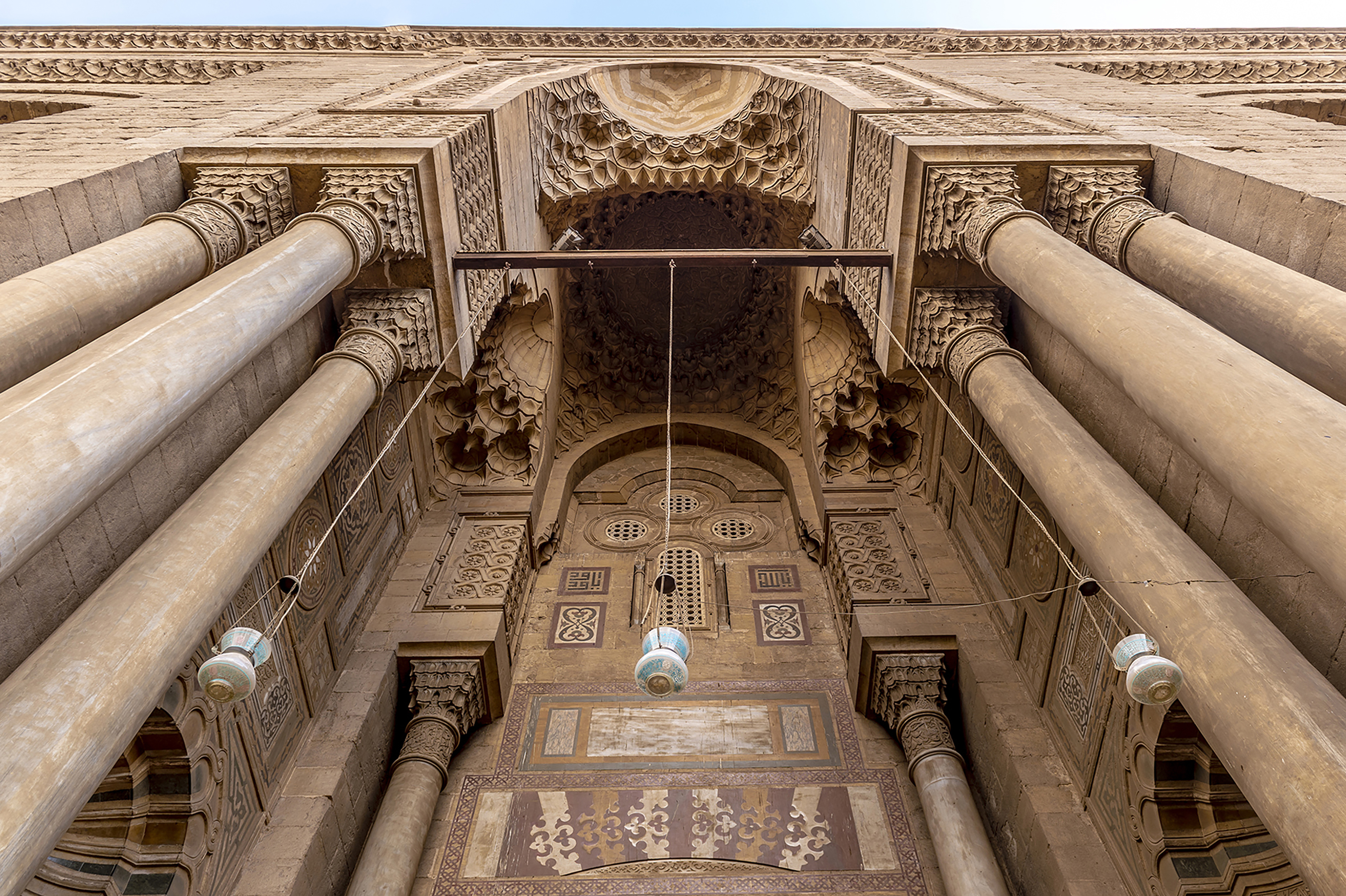
Detail of the entrance portal of the al-Rifa'i Mosque, which exemplifies the revival of Mamluk-style decoration, including ablaq (polychrome stonework), Arabic inscriptions, and muqarnas

Historic Mamluk architecture was characterized by creative floor plans that adapted to local urban environments while simultaneously seeking to dominate them visually. It featured tall entrance portals, minarets, and domes, with decoration consisting of elaborate stone carving and polychrome stone finishes, particularly in ablaq.

The Neo-Mamluk style blended modern western European architectural ideas with elements of historical Mamluk architecture. For the most part, the designs implemented European architectural principles while Mamluk elements were limited to decoration and occasionally to some aspects of interior design. The decorative elements of Mamluk-style decoration that were re-used in this context included ablaq, interlacing floral and geometric motifs, large Arabic calligraphic inscriptions, and muqarnas. Many of the buildings designed in the 1890s and 1900s, when the Ministry of Awqaf was at its most active, are particularly strict in their historicism and reflect a closer knowledge of the historical Mamluk style by comparison with earlier attempts at Islamic or Arab-style revivalism.

== Major examples ==
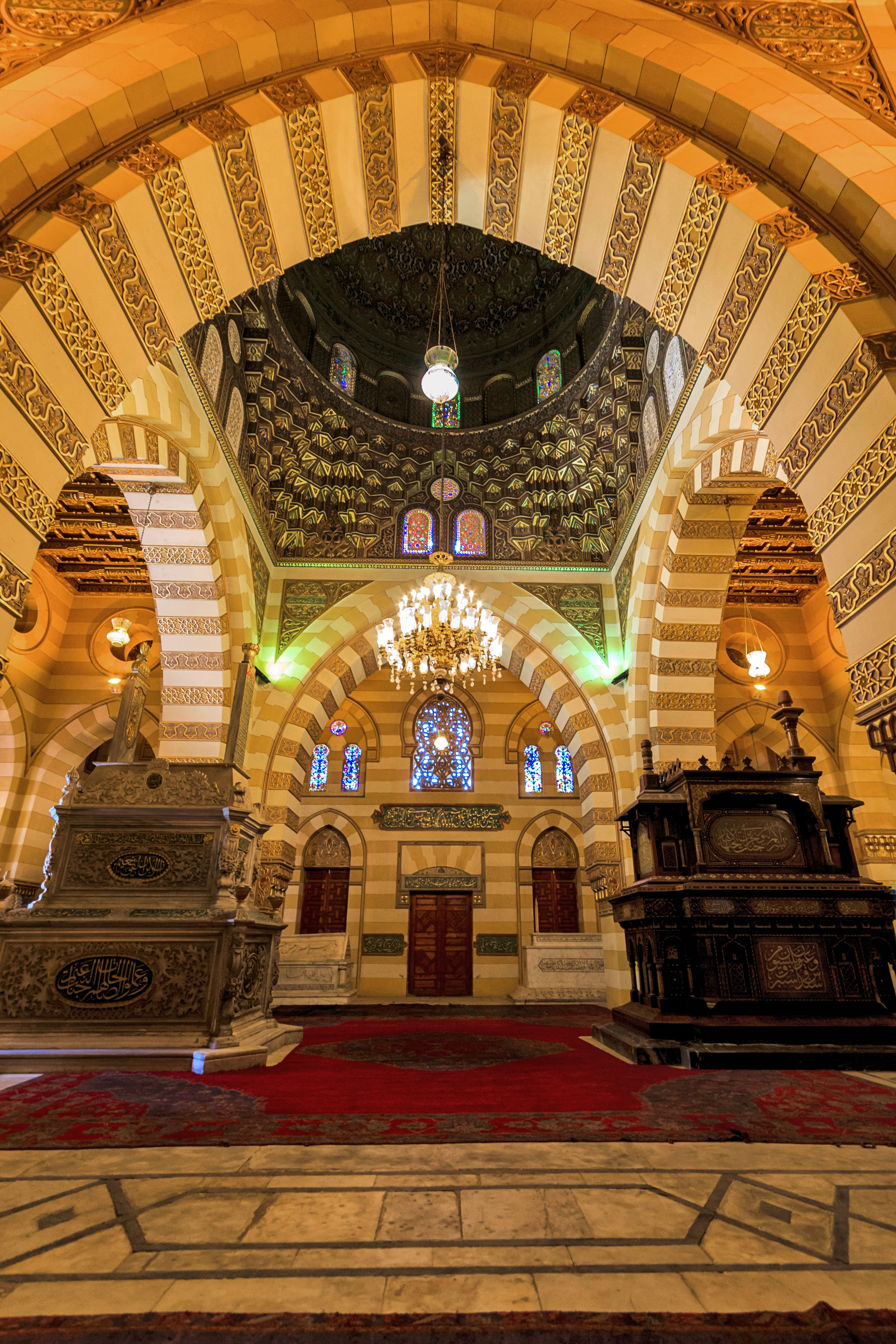
Interior of the Qubbat Afandina in Cairo (1894), by Dimitri Fabricius Bey

One of the most important monuments of this style is the aforementioned al-Rifa'i Mosque in Cairo. It was commissioned in 1869 and begun by the Egyptian architect Husayn Fahmi Pasha. Its construction was interrupted from 1880 until 1906, when it restarted under the direction of Hungarian-Austrian architect Max Herz (also the head of the Comité at the time), and was finally completed in 1912. Fahmi was probably familiar with or inspired by Pascal Coste's original proposal for the Muhammad Ali Mosque, as his design of the al-Rifa'i Mosque's main façade resembles the plan drawn by Coste for his abandoned Neo-Mamluk design in the Citadel. His emphasis on symmetry in the façade was probably a reflection of respect for contemporary academic ideas about architecture. When Herz took over the work in 1906, he felt that Fahmi's emphasis on symmetry deviated from a more pure Mamluk style, but it was too late to make major modifications to the plan and he instead was satisfied with making the references to certain Mamluk-era details more explicit.

The Sayyida 'Aisha Mosque in Cairo, originally called the Awlad 'Inan Mosque, was built in its current style from 1894 to 1896. It was originally located across from the present-day Ramses Station, where the al-Fath Mosque currently stands, before it was moved in 1979 to its current location near the Citadel and renamed. It replaced an older mosque and shrine destroyed during Napoleon's invasion. Its Neo-Mamluk style is the work of the Comité or of Saber Sabri, the chief engineer of the Awqaf Ministry and also a member of the Comité.

The Sayyida Nafisa Mosque in Cairo was remodeled in Neo-Mamluk style in 1895, following damage to the previous building by a fire in 1892. The architect was most likely Saber Sabri, though the present-day building may include later additions from a 1972 restoration.

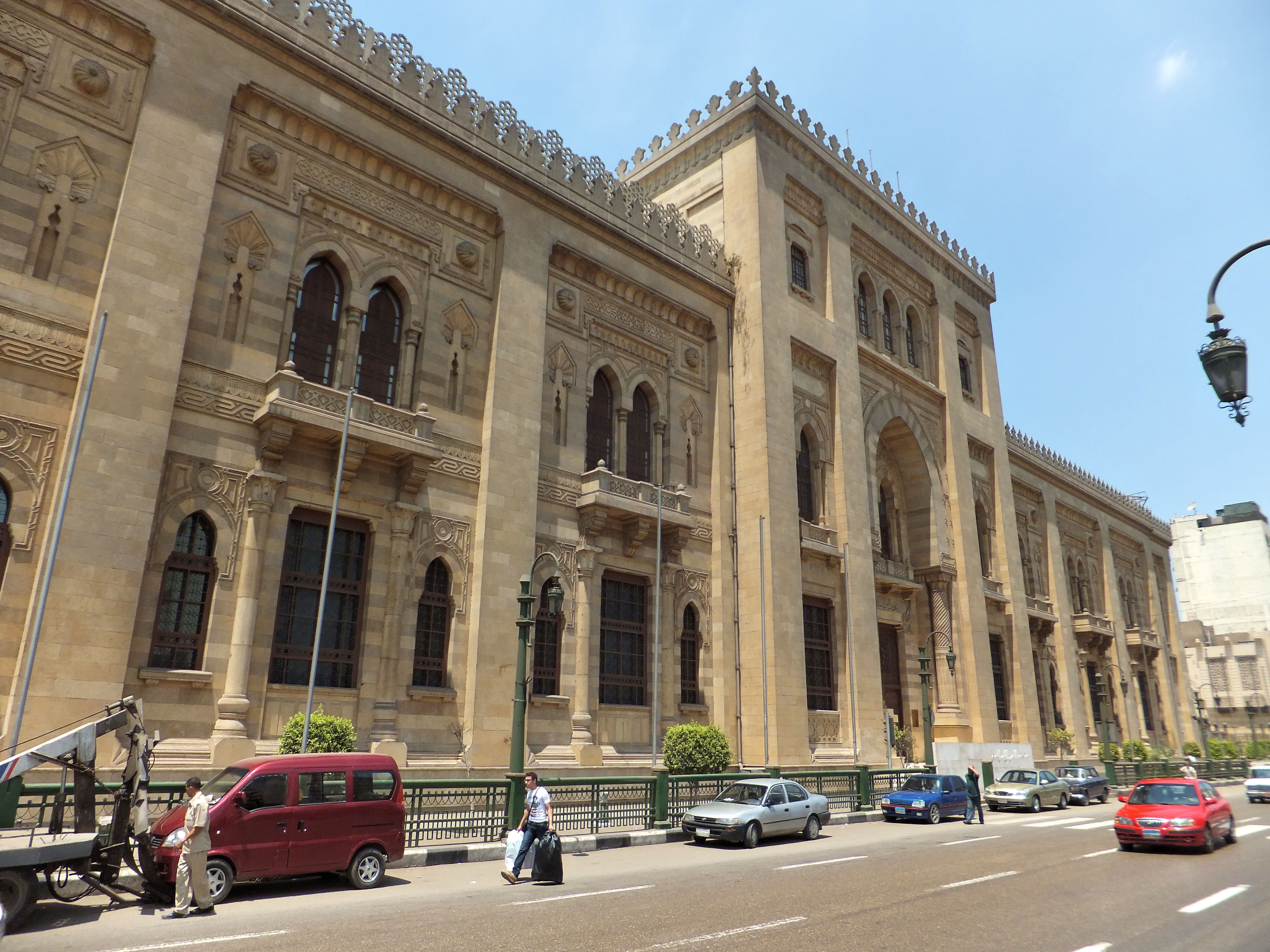
Exterior of the Museum of Islamic Art in Cairo (1903), by Alfonso Manescalo

In addition to mosques, the style was commonly used for government buildings and for the grand residences of Egyptian and European elites. Many apartment buildings of the era also incorporated Neo-Mamluk elements in their façades, especially in the new or emerging suburbs of Cairo such as Shubra, Abbasia, Garden City, and Heliopolis.

The building of the Ministry of Awqaf (religious endowments), was constructed from 1896 to 1898, with additional phases in 1911 and 1929. Several architects were involved due to these successive phases, including Saber Sabri, Mahmoud Fahmi, and Mario Rossi. As a large office bloc with an internal courtyard, its conception does not resemble any historical Mamluk building. As a result, the building is more innovative and more eclectic in its references to Mamluk antecedents.

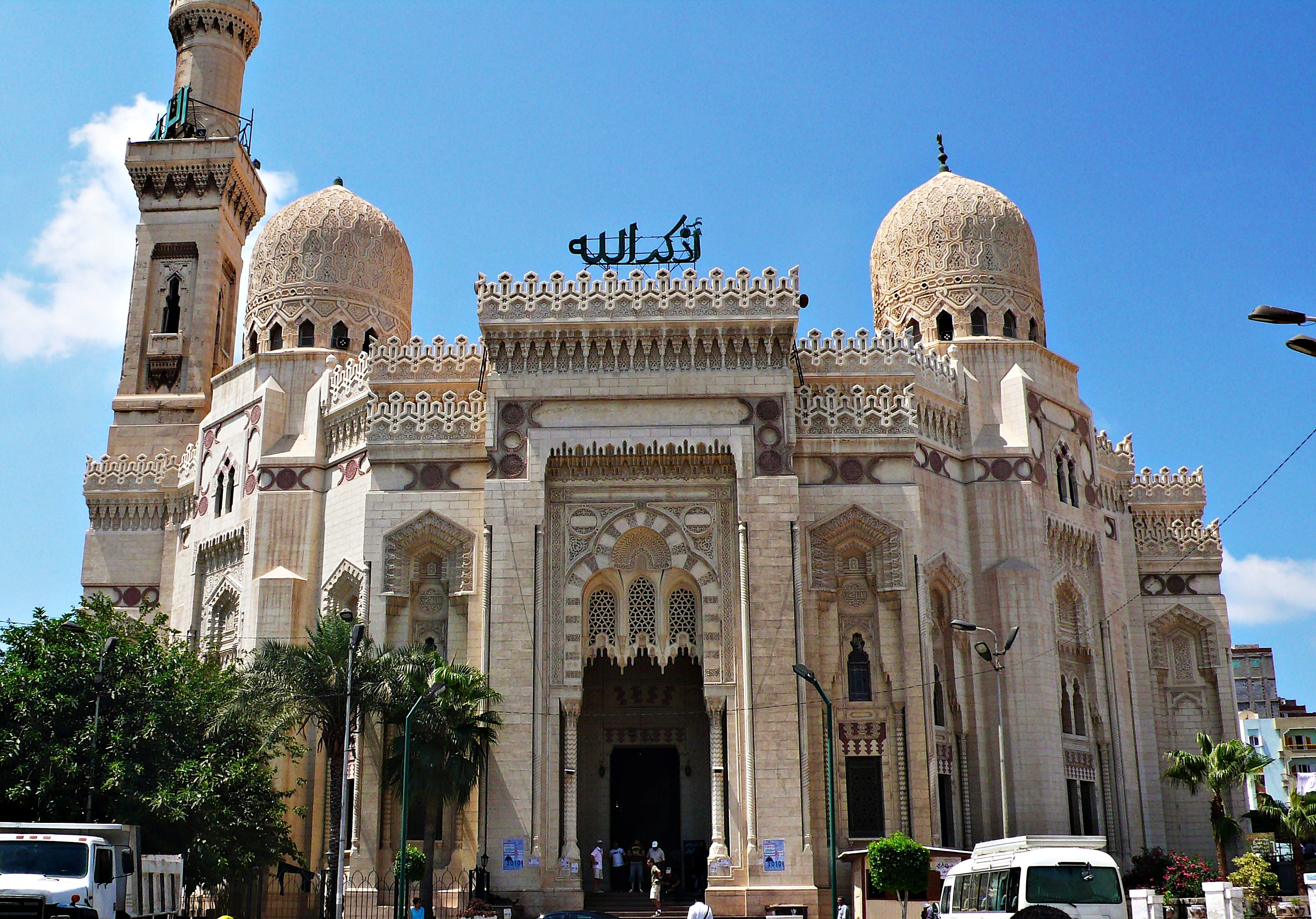
The Abu al-Abbas al-Mursi Mosque in Alexandria (1929–1945), by Eugenio Valziana and Mario Rossi

Other examples of Neo-Mamluk buildings include:

- The Sayyida Zaynab Mosque in Cairo, finished in 1885 or 1887.
- The Qubbat Afandina (Mausoleum of Muhammad Tawfiq Pasha), commissioned by Abbas Hilmi and completed in 1894. It was designed by Dimitri Fabricius Bey, the chief architect of the khedivate at the time.
- The Riwaq al-'Abbasi, an annex to the al-Azhar Mosque built between 1894 and 1898.
- The Museum of Islamic Art in Cairo, built in 1903 by Italian architect Alfonso Manescalo.
- The Egyptian National Library (Dar al-Kutub), built in 1904 and designed by Alfonso Manescalo, and attached to the Museum of Islamic Art.
- The Mosque of Sayyida Sukayna (1904), which has an Ottoman-inspired floor plan with Neo-Mamluk decoration.
- The Cairo Railway Station (now Ramses Station), first opened in 1856 but destroyed by fire in 1882, was rebuilt between 1891 and 1893 in a Neo-Mamluk style. The architect was Husayn Fahmi Pasha.
- Abu al-Abbas al-Mursi Mosque in Alexandria (1929–1945) by Italian architects Eugenio Valziana and Mario Rossi, whose exterior is designed in a Neo-Mamluk style, with inspiration from the late Mamluk period in particular.
- The mausoleum of Ahmed Hassanein Bey in the Northern Cemetery of Cairo, designed by Hassan Fathy in 1946.
