= Northern coast of Egypt =

Mediterranean coast of Matrouh Governorate, Egypt

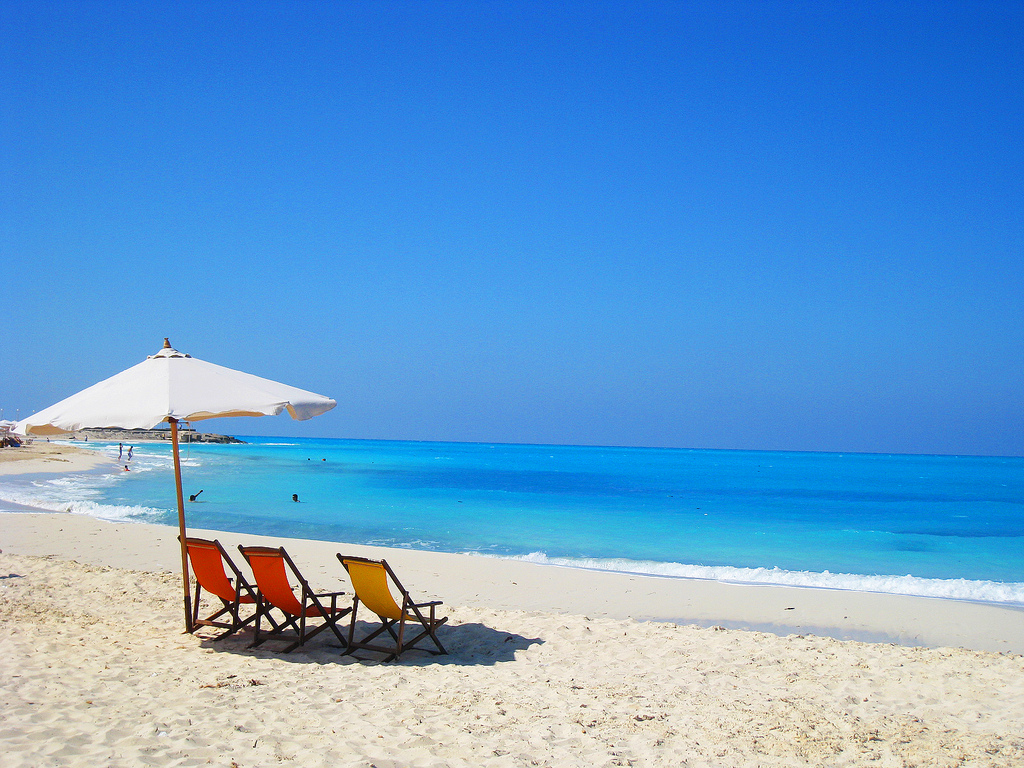
The Mediterranean coast of Egypt

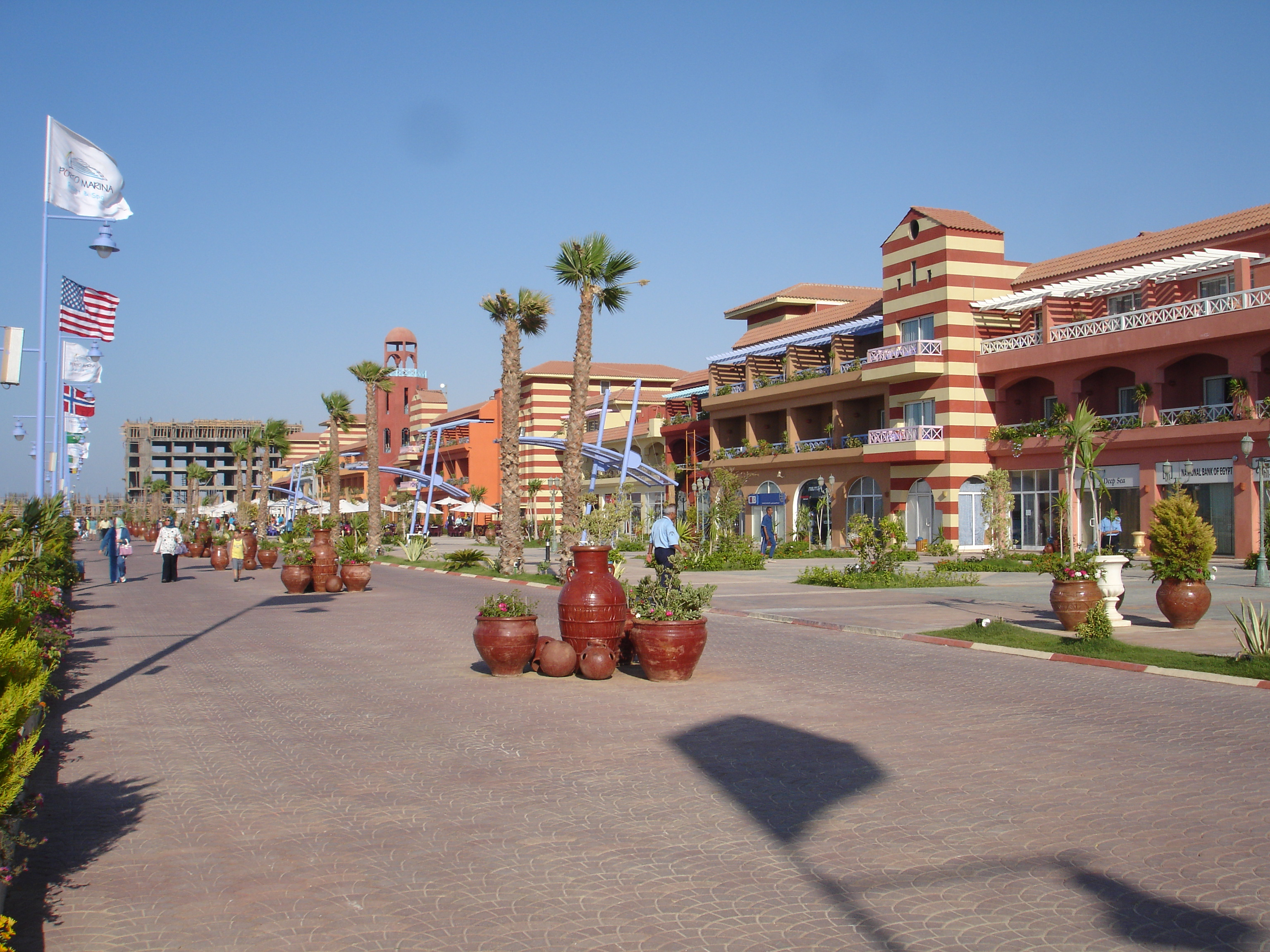
Hotels at Porto Marina, one of the North Coast's tourist destinations

The Northern Coast of Egypt (Arabic: الساحل الشمالي, Al Sahel Al Shamali), is a Mediterranean coastal region located entirely within Matrouh Governorate in northwestern Egypt. It extends along the Mediterranean Sea towards Sallum near the Egypt–Libya border. The region is one of Egypt's most popular summer tourist destinations, known for its sandy beaches, clear waters and numerous seaside resorts.

The North Coast is an important destination for domestic tourism in Egypt. During the summer, Egyptians commonly travel to the region to escape the heat in other parts of the country, staying in its villages, hotels and resorts. Popular destinations include El Alamein, Sidi Abdel Rahman, Ras El Hekma, Sidi Heneish and Marsa Matruh.

== History ==
During the Eocene, parts of what is now northern Egypt were covered by an ancient sea. Over millions of years, marine organisms, including nummulites, accumulated on the seabed and contributed to the formation of limestone. Limestone from Egypt was subsequently used in ancient construction, including the building of monuments.

The Mediterranean coast of Matrouh has a long history of maritime activity and settlement. Marsa Matruh, known in antiquity as Paraetonium, was an important coastal location during the ancient Egyptian, Greek and Roman periods. Archaeological remains in the area include ancient tombs, baths and other structures associated with Roman settlement and trade.

The idea of travelling outside one's city to visit beaches in other parts of Egypt during the summer became widespread after the 23 July Revolution of 1952.

In 1986, an ancient Roman town was discovered during construction work on the Marina resort in El Alamein. The Egyptian government subsequently decided to turn the archaeological site into an open-air museum.

In February 2024, Egypt and the United Arab Emirates signed an investment agreement worth US$35 billion to develop Ras El Hekma, a coastal area east of Marsa Matruh, into a major urban and tourist development. The project involves the Abu Dhabi Developmental Holding Company.

== Geography and nature ==
The North Coast is characterised mainly by flat coastal plains, sandy beaches, dunes and low shrubland. Unlike some other coastal regions of North Africa, it has no extensive mountain ranges along its shoreline.

The westernmost part of the region includes the Marmarika Plateau, which reaches elevations of approximately 400 metres. The plateau forms a distinctive elevated landscape in the western coastal area.

The region is characterised by Mediterranean vegetation and wildlife, including coastal shrubs and grasses. Its natural environment varies between sandy coastal areas, rocky sections and inland plains.

The Mediterranean coast of Matrouh is also important for agriculture. Rainfall and groundwater resources support the cultivation of crops such as figs, olives and other Mediterranean plants.

== Climate ==
Although most of Egypt has a hot desert climate (BWh) under the Köppen climate classification, the North Coast has a Mediterranean-influenced climate. Winds from the Mediterranean Sea moderate temperatures, making summers relatively hot and humid and winters mild and wetter than in most other parts of Egypt.

The region receives more rainfall than most of Egypt, particularly in its western areas. Rainfall generally occurs during winter, while hail and occasional sleet may occur during colder weather. Snowfall is rare but can occur in some inland locations.

Temperatures vary seasonally, with relatively mild winters and warm to hot summers. Coastal breezes help moderate summer temperatures compared with inland areas.

== Cities, towns and villages ==
The North Coast includes several cities, towns, villages and tourist resort developments, all located within Matrouh Governorate. Among its principal destinations are:

- El Alamein: A coastal city known for its beaches, modern tourist developments and historical significance during World War II.
- Marina: A major tourist resort area containing numerous beaches, hotels and recreational facilities, as well as nearby archaeological remains from the ancient Roman period.
- Sidi Abdel Rahman: A popular summer destination known for its beaches, resorts and coastal developments.
- El Dabaa: A major town in Matrouh Governorate, surrounded by several tourist and residential developments.
- Fuka: A coastal destination known for its beaches and Mediterranean agricultural products.
- Ras El Hekma: A coastal area known for its natural bay, sandy beaches and major tourism and urban development projects.
- Sidi Heneish: A coastal destination known for its beaches and tourist resorts.
- Marsa Matruh: The capital of Matrouh Governorate and one of Egypt's principal Mediterranean coastal cities. It is known for its white sandy beaches, clear waters and historical attractions.
- Sallum: A border town near the Egypt–Libya border, located in the western part of the Egyptian Mediterranean coast.

== Tourism ==
The North Coast is one of Egypt's leading domestic summer tourism destinations. Its beaches, relatively mild coastal climate and extensive resort developments attract visitors from different parts of the country.

Tourism activity is concentrated mainly during the summer months, when hotels, villages and seaside resorts receive large numbers of Egyptian visitors. Popular destinations include Marina, Sidi Abdel Rahman, Ras El Hekma and Marsa Matruh.

The region also contains historical and archaeological attractions, particularly in El Alamein and Marsa Matruh, in addition to its natural coastal landscapes.

== See also ==
- Red Sea Riviera
