= Max Herz =

Hungarian architect (1856–1919)

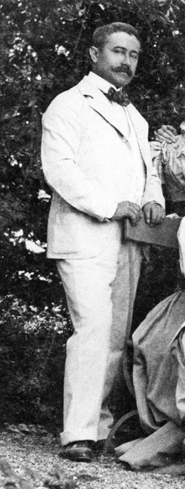
- Max Herz
- Born: Herz Miksa; 19 May 1856; Ottlaka, Austrian Empire
- Died: 5 May 1919; Zürich, Switzerland
- Education: TU Wien, Vienna; Technical University of Budapest
- Occupation: Architect
- Practice: Alajos Hauszmann; Henrich von Ferstel; Carl König

Max Herz (born Herz Miksa; 19 May 1856 – 5 May 1919) was a Hungarian architect, conservator, museum director and architectural historian, active in Egypt.

== Life ==
Herz was born on 19 May 1856 in Ottlaka, Austrian Empire (today Grăniceri, Romania) into a family of limited means. His father made a living from agriculture. Herz finished his primary and secondary schooling in Temesvár (now Timișoara, Romania). He studied architecture under Alajos Hauszmann in Budapest (Technical University; 1874–1877) and under Henrich von Ferstel and Carl König in Vienna (Technical College; 1877–1880). After his final examinations he undertook a long journey through Italy, which also took him to Egypt in the autumn of 1880. Quite unexpectedly, Julius Franz Pasha, the head of the Technical Office of the Waqf Ministry (Ministry of Religious Affairs) offered Herz a job in Cairo. He accepted, and joined the office, which was also responsible for the conservation of mosques. As chief architect to the Comité de Conservation des Monuments de l'Art Arabe, he directed the conservation of monuments of Arab-Islamic and Coptic architecture all over Egypt, first of all in Cairo from 1890 until the end of 1914.

Upon the outbreak of World War I, at the end of 1914, Herz, a Hungarian citizen, was forced into retirement and expelled from the country as an enemy alien by the British authorities; though officially an autonomous province of the Ottoman Empire with special rights, Egypt had been under British military occupation from 1882 on. Leaving all his possessions behind, he went to Milan with his family, where the relatives of his Italian wife lived. As he had to stay in a neutral country in order to receive his pension from Egypt, he moved on to Zürich after Italy declared war on her ally, the Austro-Hungarian Monarchy, on 23 May 1915. The world in which he had lived collapsed. The sudden death of his son (17) in the autumn of 1914 was a great blow, from which he never really recovered and which considerably aggravated his situation. The man, who had been full of optimism all his life, gradually broke. He developed a gastric illness and died during an operation. In accordance with his wish, he lies buried in the grave he himself designed for his son in Milan (Cimitero Monumentale). When his widow died in 1949, she was buried next to them.

== Activities ==
=== Conservation of monuments ===
In the 19th century, the state of preservation of Arab-Islamic monuments in Egypt deteriorated rapidly. In order to counteract this process, Khedive Tawfīq founded the Comité de Conservation des Monuments de l'Art Arabe in 1881. In it Max Herz inherited the seat of the retiring Franz Pasha in 1887 and from 1890 filled the post of chief architect, which was expressly created for him. The Comité's president was ex officio the waqf minister; however, the actual direction of affairs lay in the hands of the chief architect. Decisions were taken collectively in the sessions of the Comité, which consisted partly of Egyptian and partly of European members. However, on account of his qualification, experience, the devotion to his job, his capacity for work and last but not least his position, Herz played a decisive role in the Comité, which soon extended the sphere of its activities to monuments of Coptic architecture too. (The preservation of monuments of ancient Egyptian [pharaonic] architecture was the task of a different government agency.) Max Herz filled this post for a quarter of a century (1890–1914), and in this capacity he played an outstanding role in the preservation of monuments of Arab-Islamic and Coptic architecture. We are indebted to him for the survival of a number of monuments, while in the case of restored monuments it was he who more or less determined the form in which they appear today. His outstanding achievements along with his amiable personality won him general recognition; his activities are regarded as exemplary to this very day. Herz followed the method of "stylistic restoration". It meant ridding a monument of later additions of low quality and restoring it to its original, most splendid, even ideal shape, "which may never have existed at any given time" (Viollet-le-Duc). The other extreme approach to architectural preservation demanded the avoidance of any sort of restoration or reconstruction; only the preservation of the monument in its actually existing shape was permitted, without any additions. Herz was a believer in stylistic restoration but practised it with moderation, good taste and common sense. This approach was determined in part by the chronic lack of funds at the Comité's disposal, which did not allow complete restoration on a large scale. At a very early stage the Comité decided that its foremost task was to secure the survival of the greatest possible number of monuments, which children of a happier and richer age would subject to complete restoration.

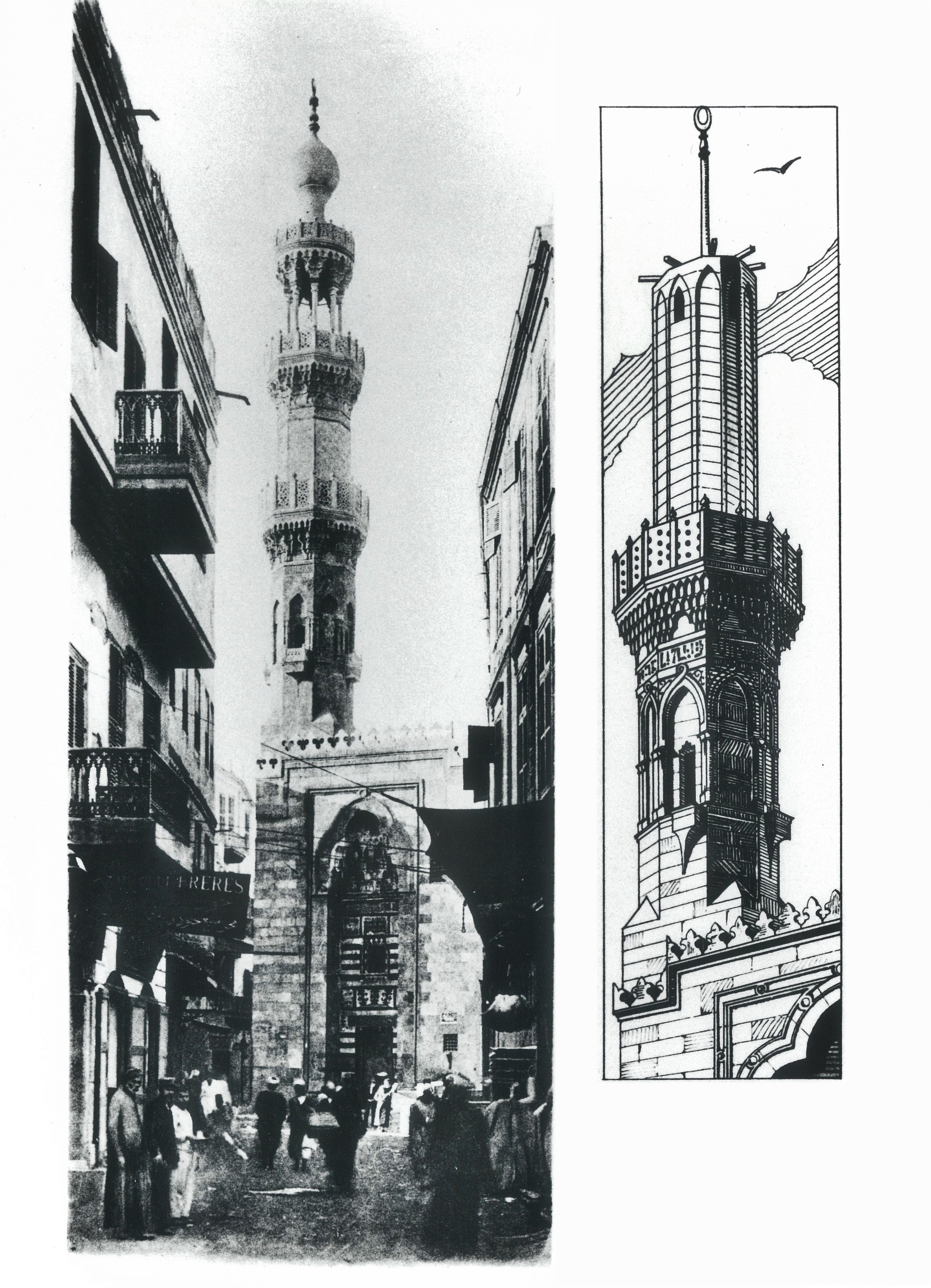
The minaret of Qadi Yahya Zayn al-Din's mosque before and after restoration. The upper part was reconstructed on the basis of analogy because no information was available on its original shape.

In Herz's practice "stylistic purity" meant that in the case of periods whose architecture was well known owing to the existence of numerous monuments, he regarded as permissible the analogical reconstruction of structures whose original shape was unknown. This was the case with the mosques from the Late or Circassian Mamluk period, which was represented with numerous splendid mosques in Cairo, the exquisite minarets of which, for instance, were in many cases damaged on account of their fragility. On the other hand, the architecture of the Fatimid period was little known, therefore he left the ugly late replacement of the original minaret of the Aqmar Mosque (519/1125) untouched when he restored it, because he had no information regarding its original shape and knew very little about Fatimid minarets in general. (His successors exercised considerably less self-restraint in the reconstruction of the Fatimid mosque of al-Salih Talai (555/1160), about the original shape of which they possessed only very scanty information.) The replacement of missing structures (e.g., fountain, pulpit) as required by "stylistic restoration" was an urgent necessity from a practical viewpoint in the case of mosques, irrespective of whether their original shape was known or not, because religious observation was to be resumed in them after the completion of restoration by the Comité.

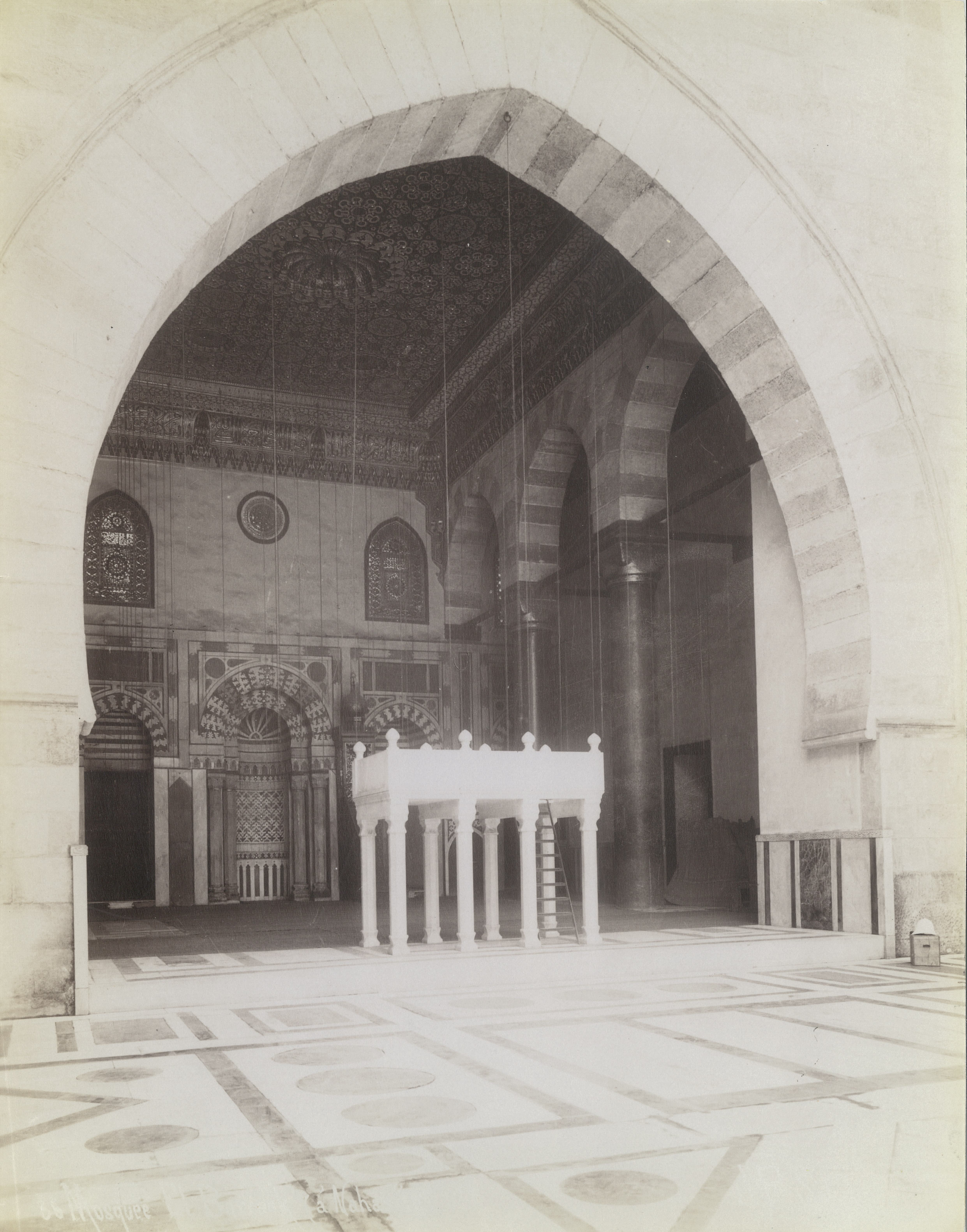
Pulpit in Sultan Barquq's mosque.

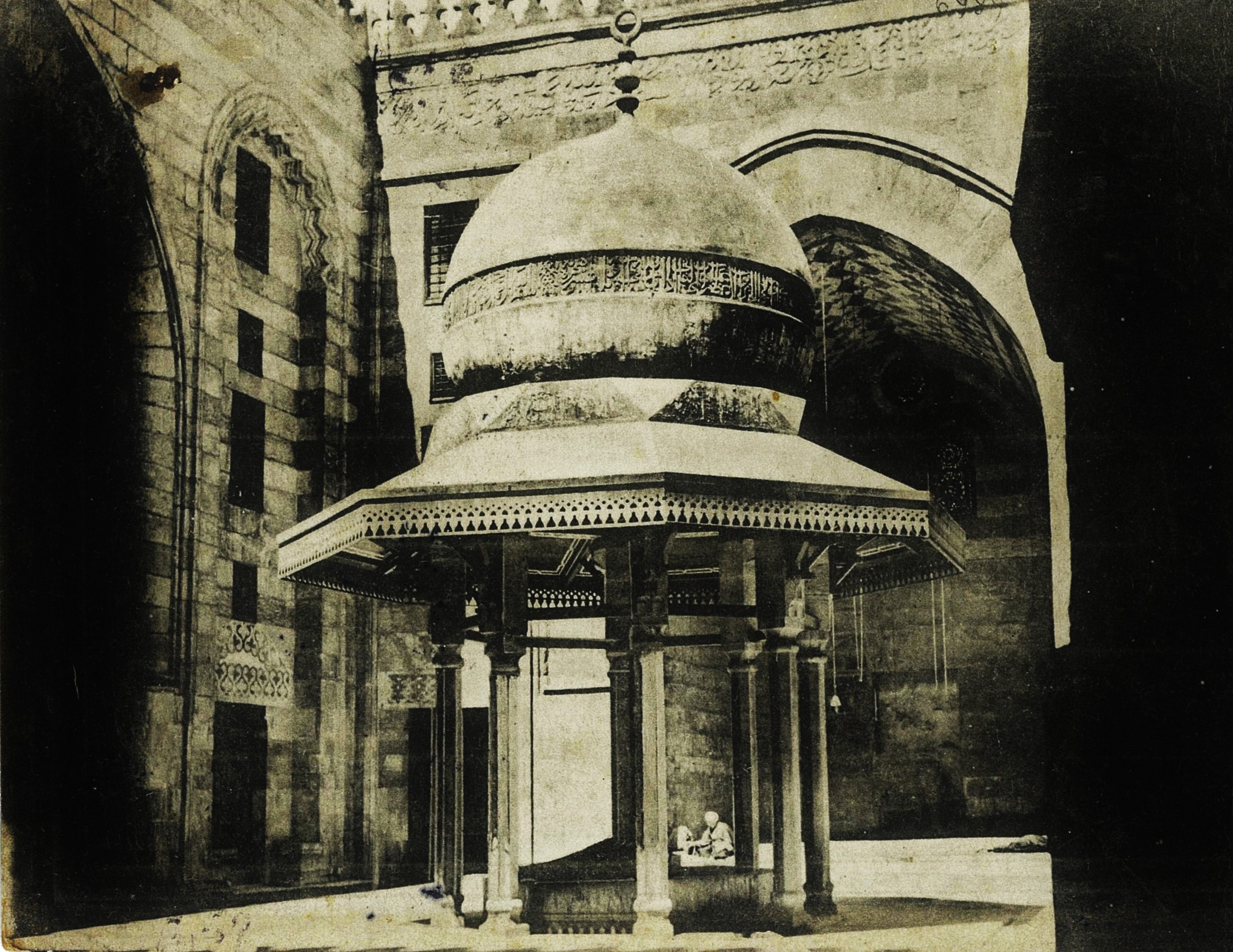
Fountain in Sultan Barquq's mosque. Analogical reconstructions by Herz, because no information was available on their original shape.

There is a continuous debate going on about the theory and practice of architectural conservation all over the world, in which various, widely differing views and standpoints are voiced, often depending on the given circumstances. In its theory and practice the Comité followed the latest standards represented in the Western world. The method adopted by the Comité under Herz Pasha is regarded as exemplary and is actually followed in the practice of conservation in Egypt to our very day. It is only natural that conflicting views are also voiced in such a complex question, especially given the circumstance that in the period under discussion the Comité functioned in a country under British occupation. The Comité's activities were characterized by a high-level professionalism, thoroughness and devotion. Nairy Hampikian wrote when she completed the restoration of Bab Zuwayla (485/1092), one of the Fatimid gates of the medieval city: "I have deliberately included many minor details in the recapitulation of these activities of the Comité, because I believe they will help counter hasty conceptual and political judgments on its activities. ... The love and care which was transmitted to these monuments through the work of the Comité, the meticulous professionalism by which its members worked, and the sincerity of their efforts is often underappreciated. Furthermore, the degree of seriousness with which these people approached their work is only really apparent when one follows its line of thinking with regard to a single structure over a number of years." The Comité carefully documented its activities. This documentation has survived; its scholarly investigation has begun. The Comité published an annual Bulletin in French about its activities; they were also translated into Arabic.

==== Monuments completely restored by Herz ====
- the Fatimid gate of Bab Zuwayla (485/1092)
- the Aqmar mosque (519/1125)
- the Qalaun complex (mausoleum, madrasa-mosque, hospital; 683-684/1284-1285)
- the mosque of the amir al-Maridani (739-740/1339-40)
- the madrasa-mosque of Sultan Hasan (757-764/1356-1362), which many regard as the most splendid monument of Arab-Islamic architecture in Cairo, or even in the world
- Sultan Barquq's madrasa-mosque (786-788/1384-1386) in the Coppersmiths' Bazaar
- the mosque of Yahya Zayn ad-Din (848/1444) in the vicinity of al-Azhar
- Sultan Qayitbay's madrasa-mausoleum (877/1472) in the Northern Cemetery
- Sultan Qayitbay's madrasa-mosque intra muros (880/1475)
- the mosque of the amir Ghanim al-Bahlawan (883-916/1478-1510)
- the mosque of Abu Bakr ibn Muzhir (884/1479-1480)
- the mosque of Qigmas al-Ishaqi (885-886/1480-1481)
- the mansion of Gamal al-Din al-Dahabi (1047/1637)
- the fountain-school of Abd al-Rahman Katkhuda (1157/1744).

Herz carried out important works of restoration on the Azhar mosque (359-361/970-972) and we are indebted to him for the survival of Fort Qayitbay (881/1477), which the Sultan erected on the remains of the Pharos in Alexandria.

Max Herz Pasha's Major Restoration Projects
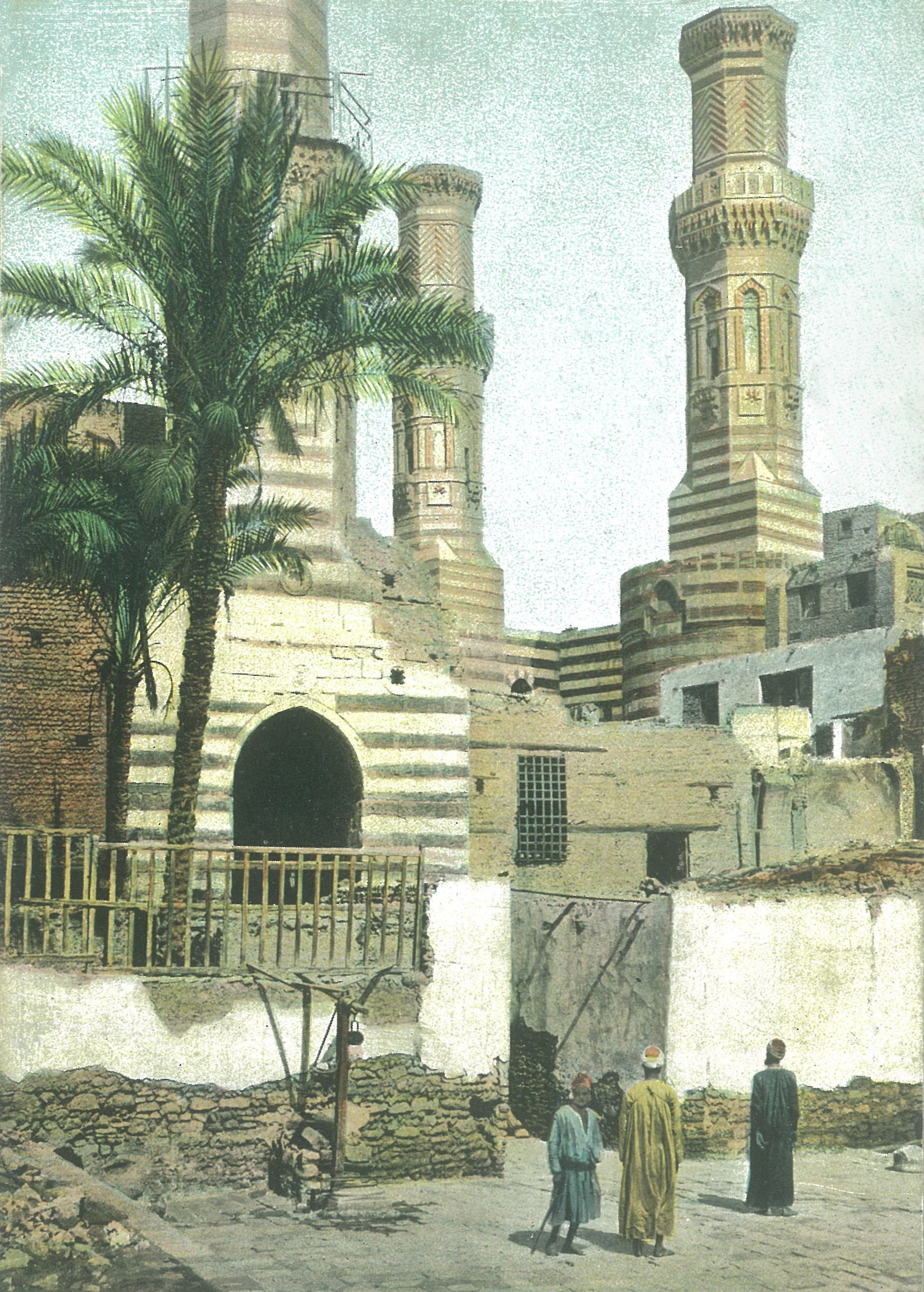
The courtyard of al-Salih Talai's mosque with the minaret surmounting the entrance to the left. The minaret was removed in 1923. In the background the truncated twin minarets of al-Muayyad Shaykh's mosque surmounting Bab Zuwayla can be seen before restoration.

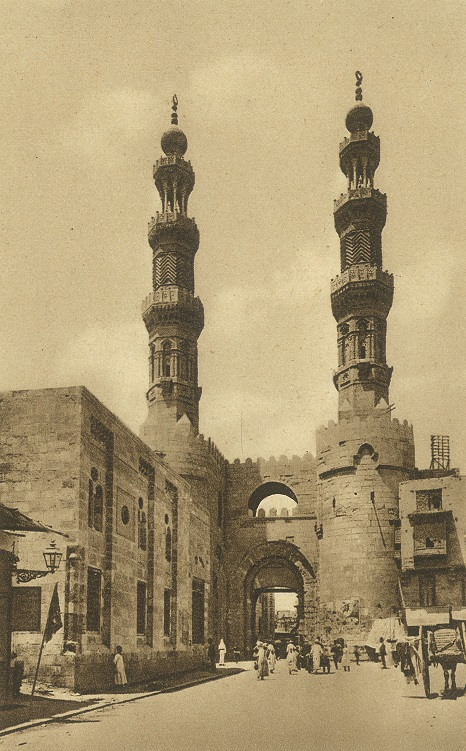
The Fatimid gate of Bab Zuwayla with the twin minarets of the adjoining mosque of Sultan al-Muayyad Shaykh. Herz restored both the gate and the splendid minarets.

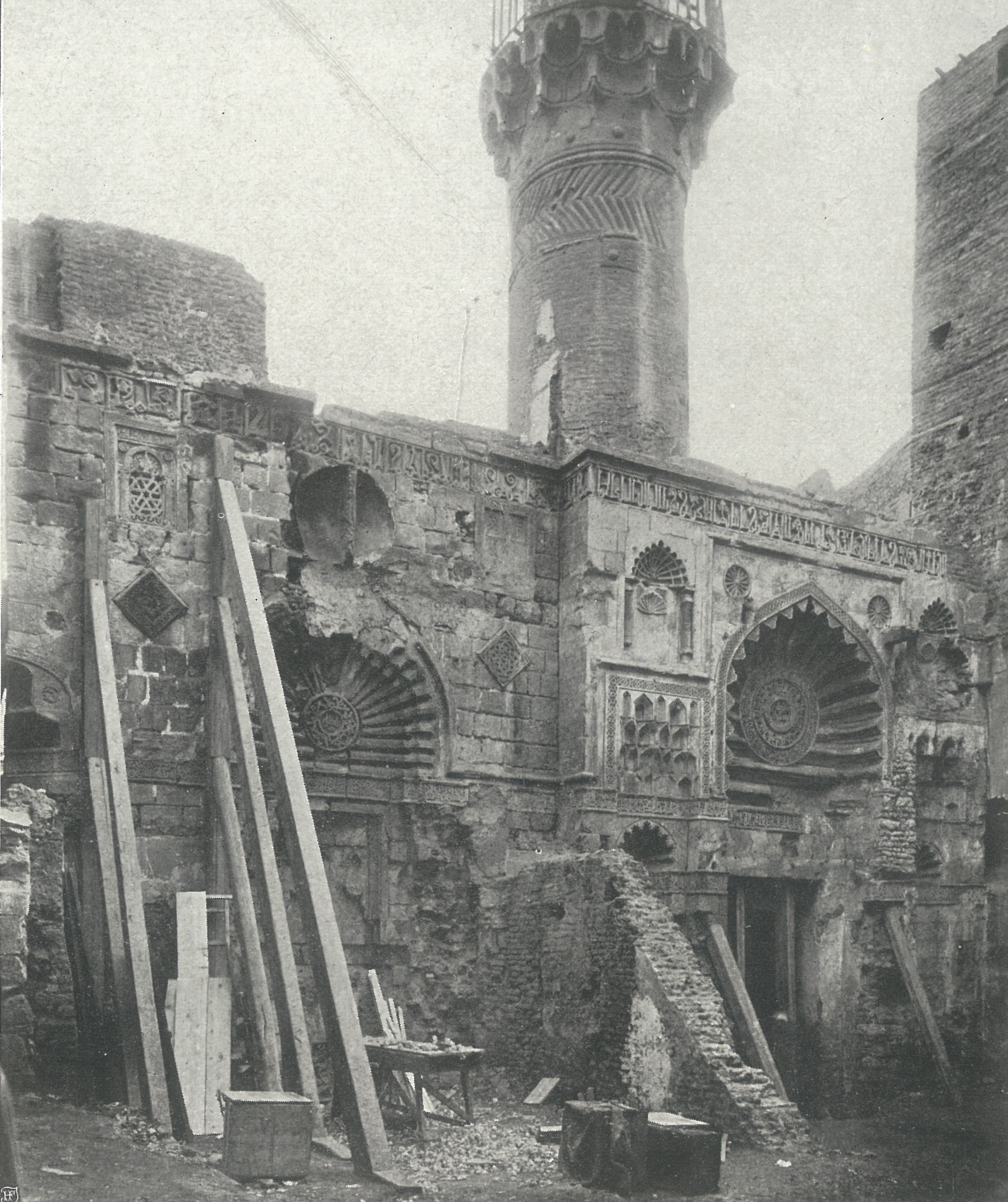
The Aqmar mosque. The façade during clearance. The façade was completely covered with booths, which Herz and the Comité succeeded in removing on the left hand side in the course of a long and difficult legal procedure.

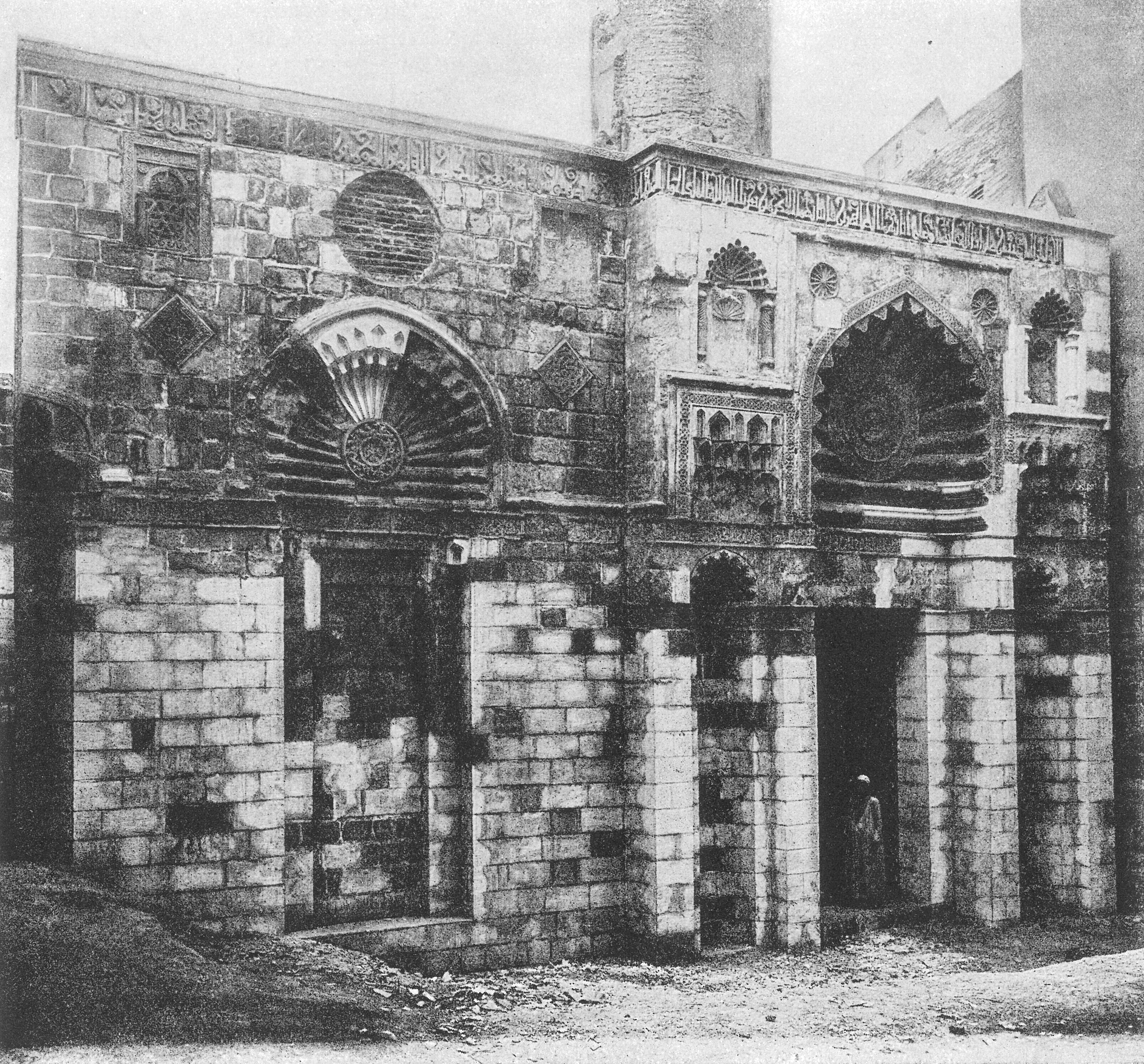
The Aqmar mosque. The façade after clearance.

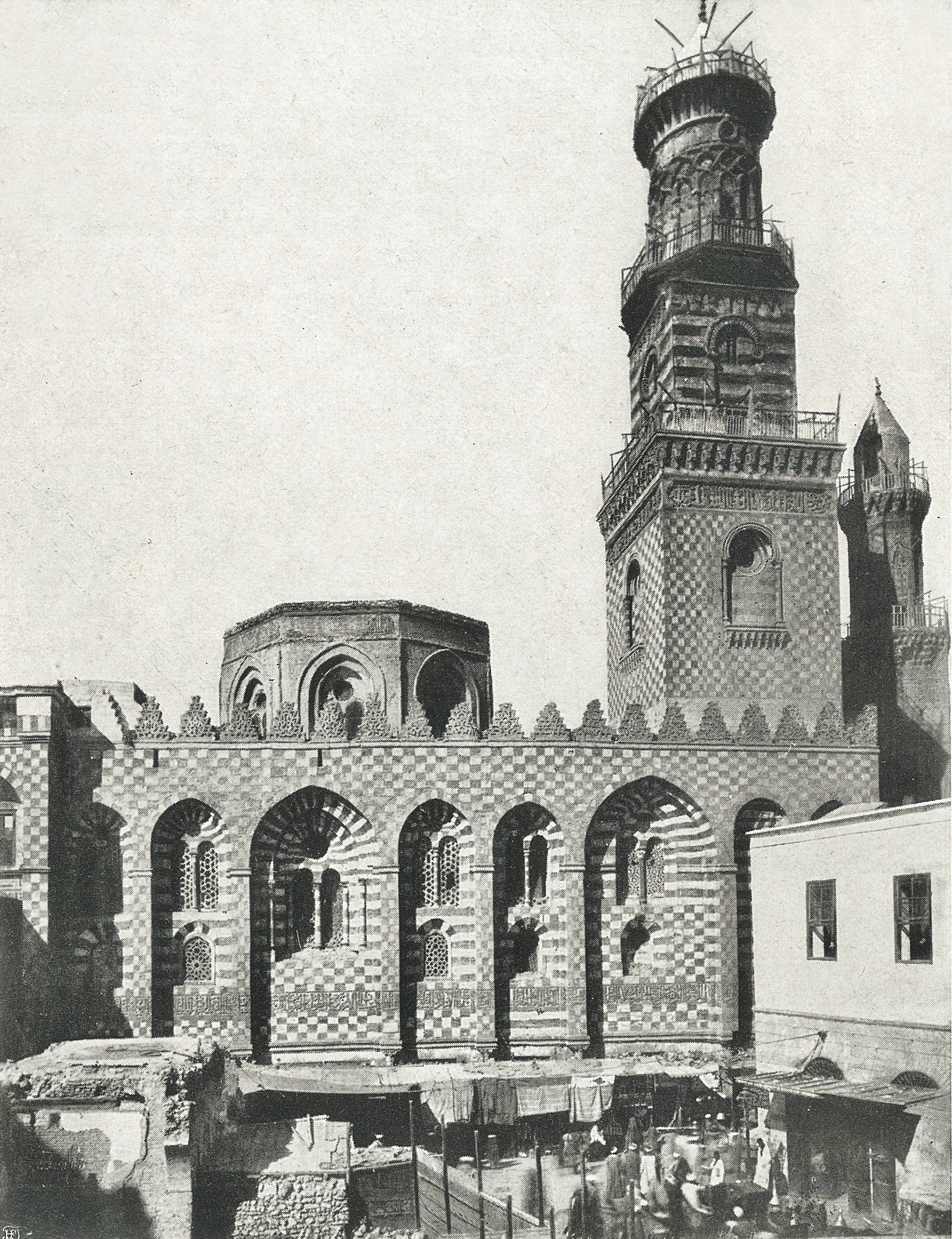
Sultan Qalaun's mausoleum. The façade with the booths before restoration.

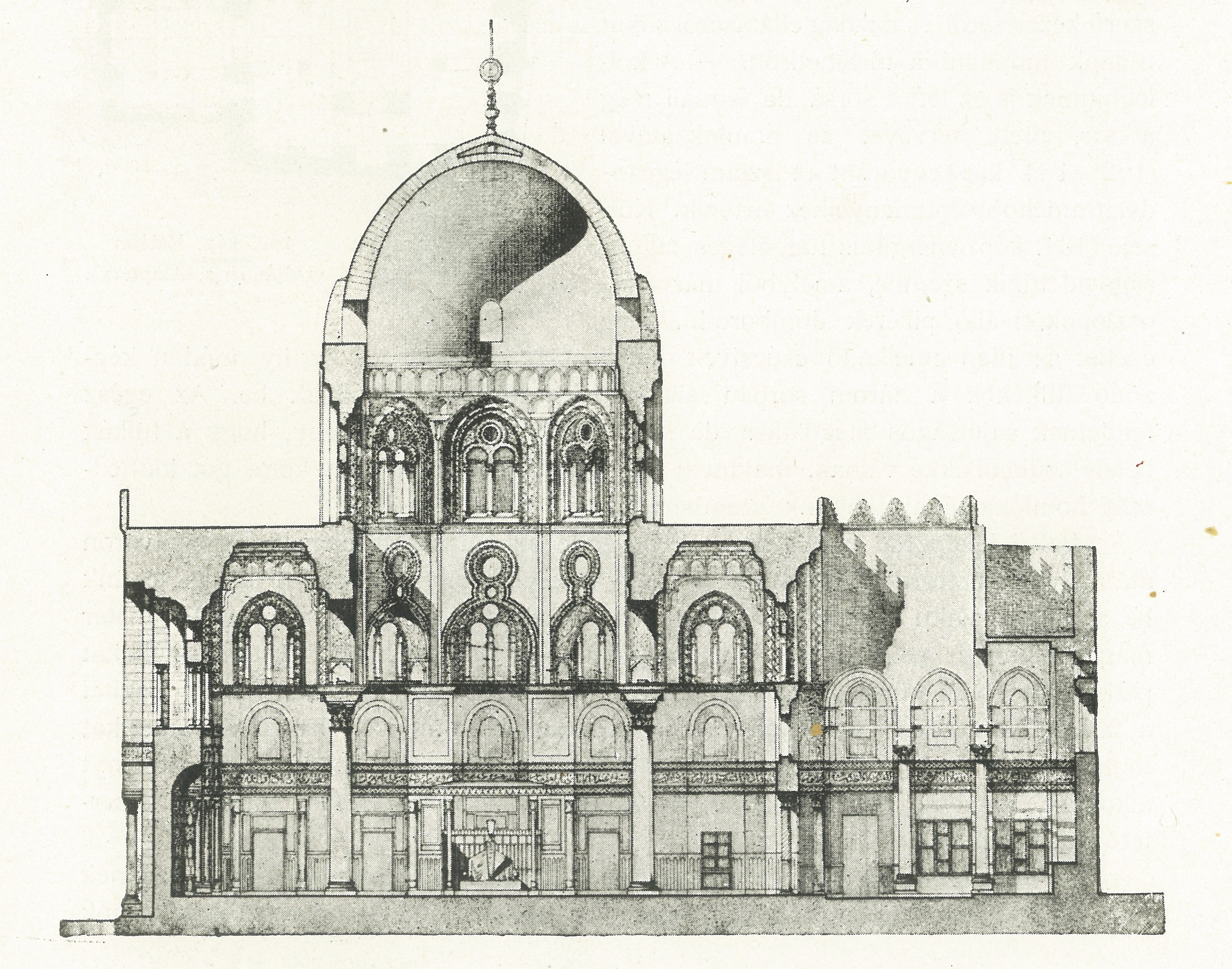
Sultan Qalaun's mausoleum. Design for the dome's reconstruction.

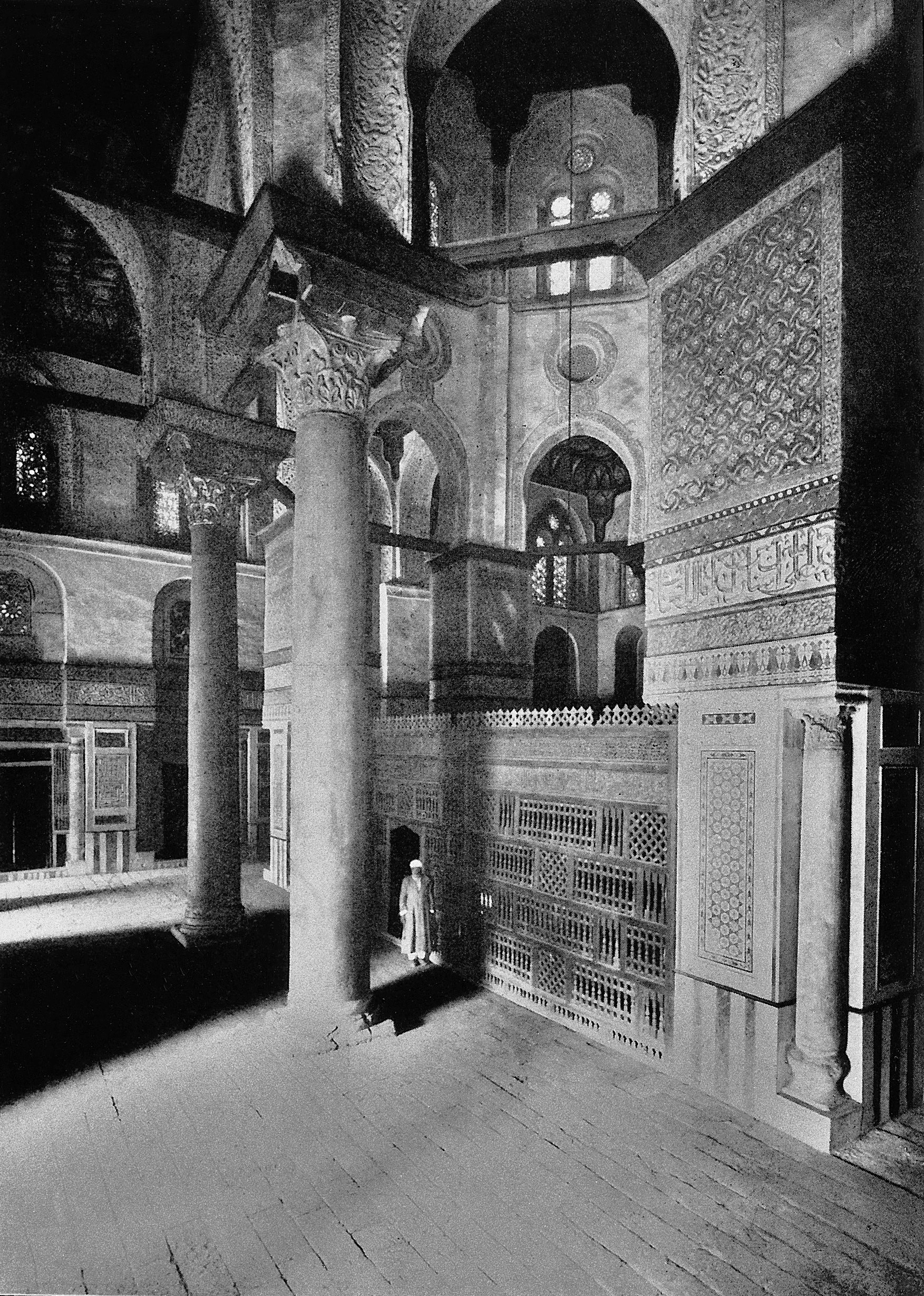
The interior of Sultan Qalaun's mausoleum after restoration.

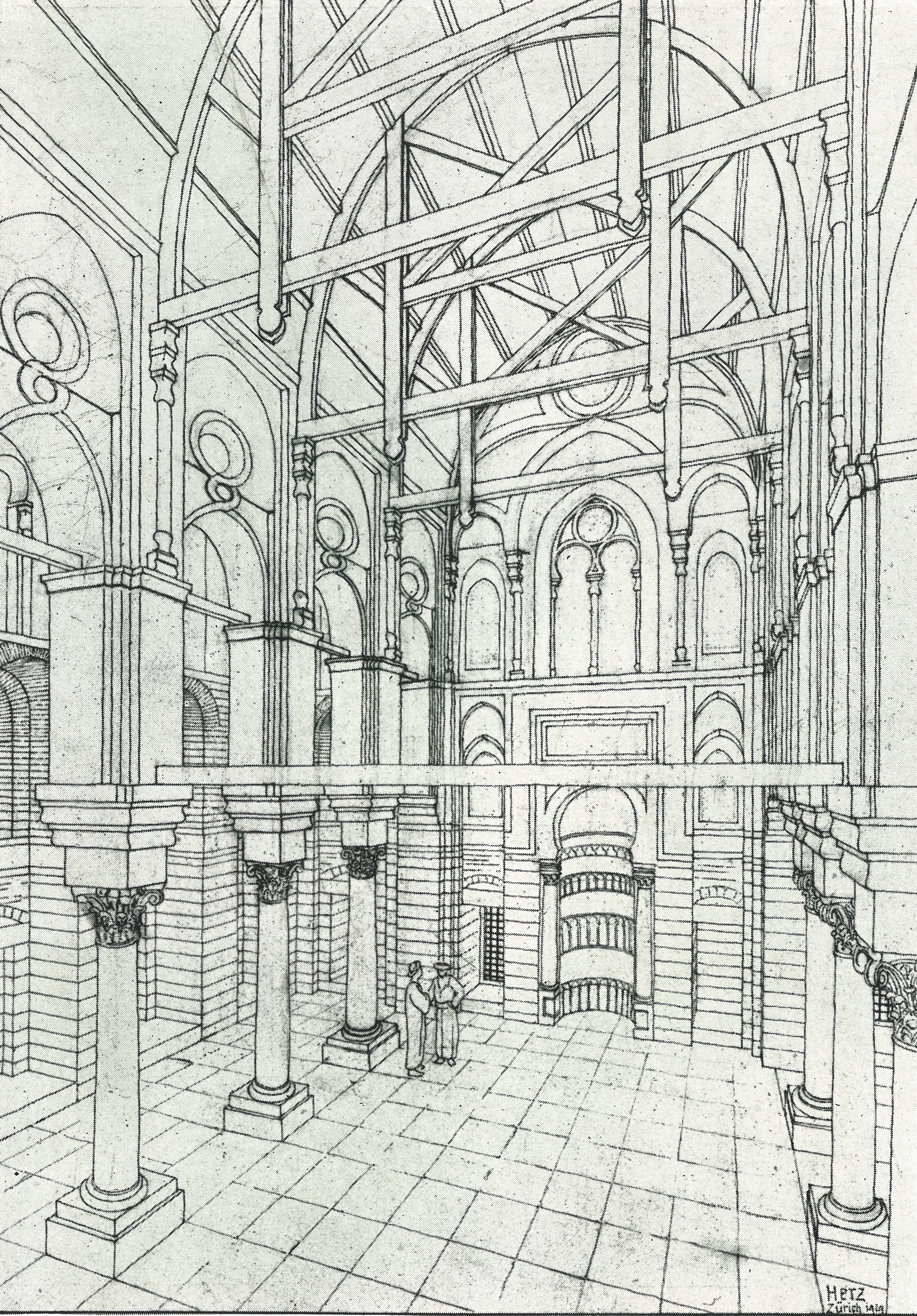
Herz's design for the restoration of Sultan Qalaun's madrasa-mosque, which he drew up in his exile in Zürich in 1919. Ultimately another design was executed.

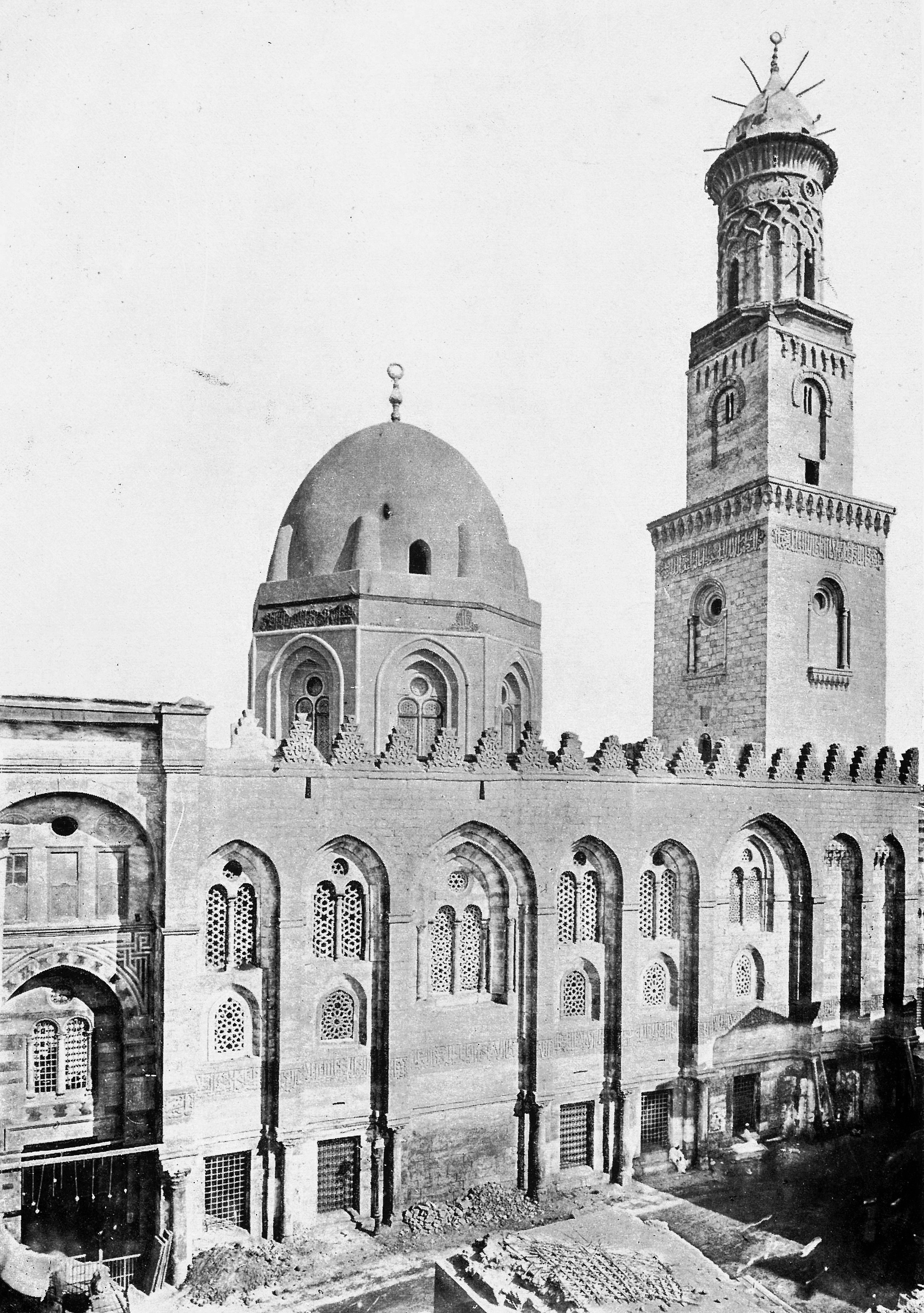
Sultan Qalaun's mausoleum after restoration.

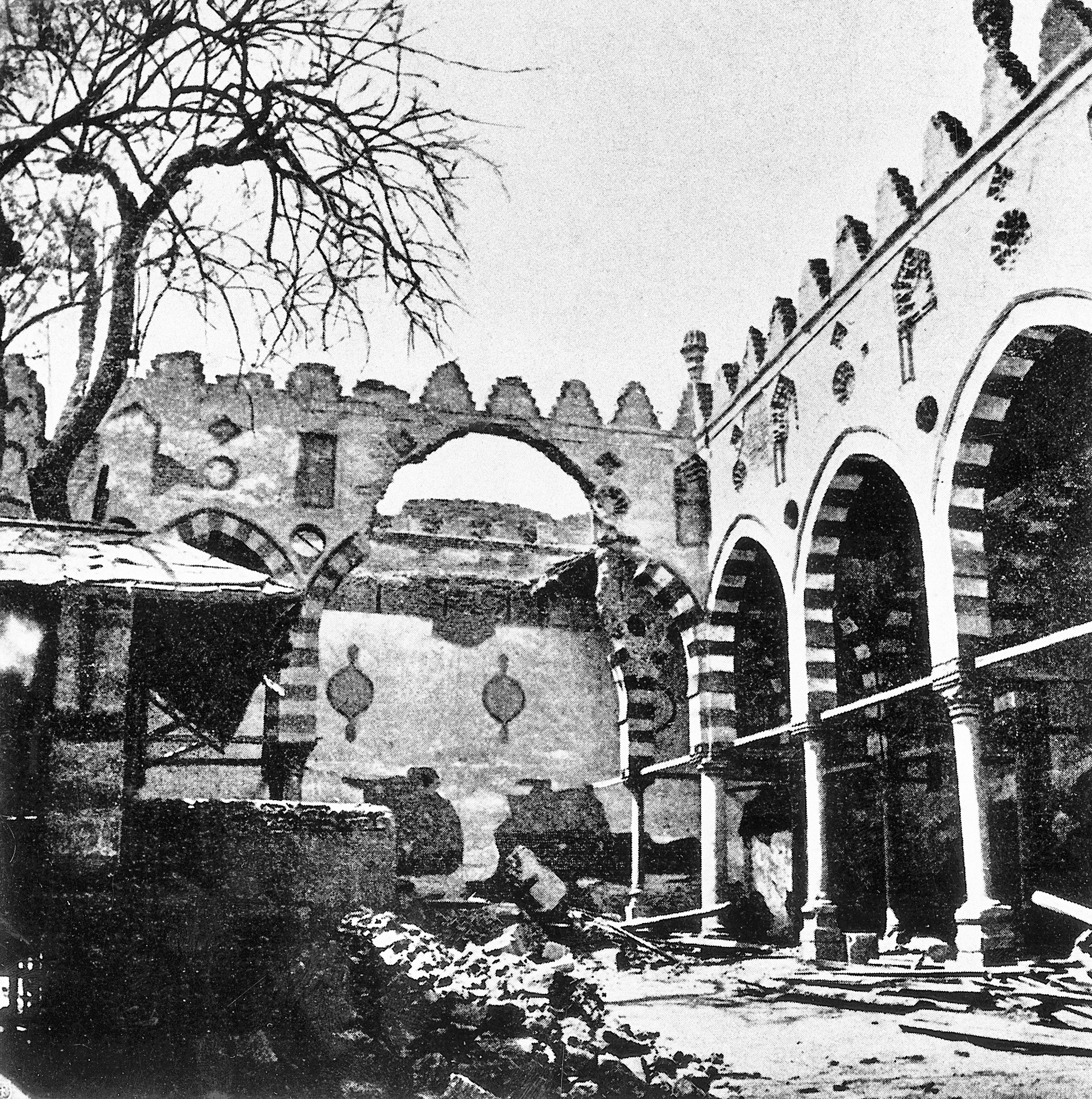
Courtyard of the mosque of the Amir al-Maridani before restoration.

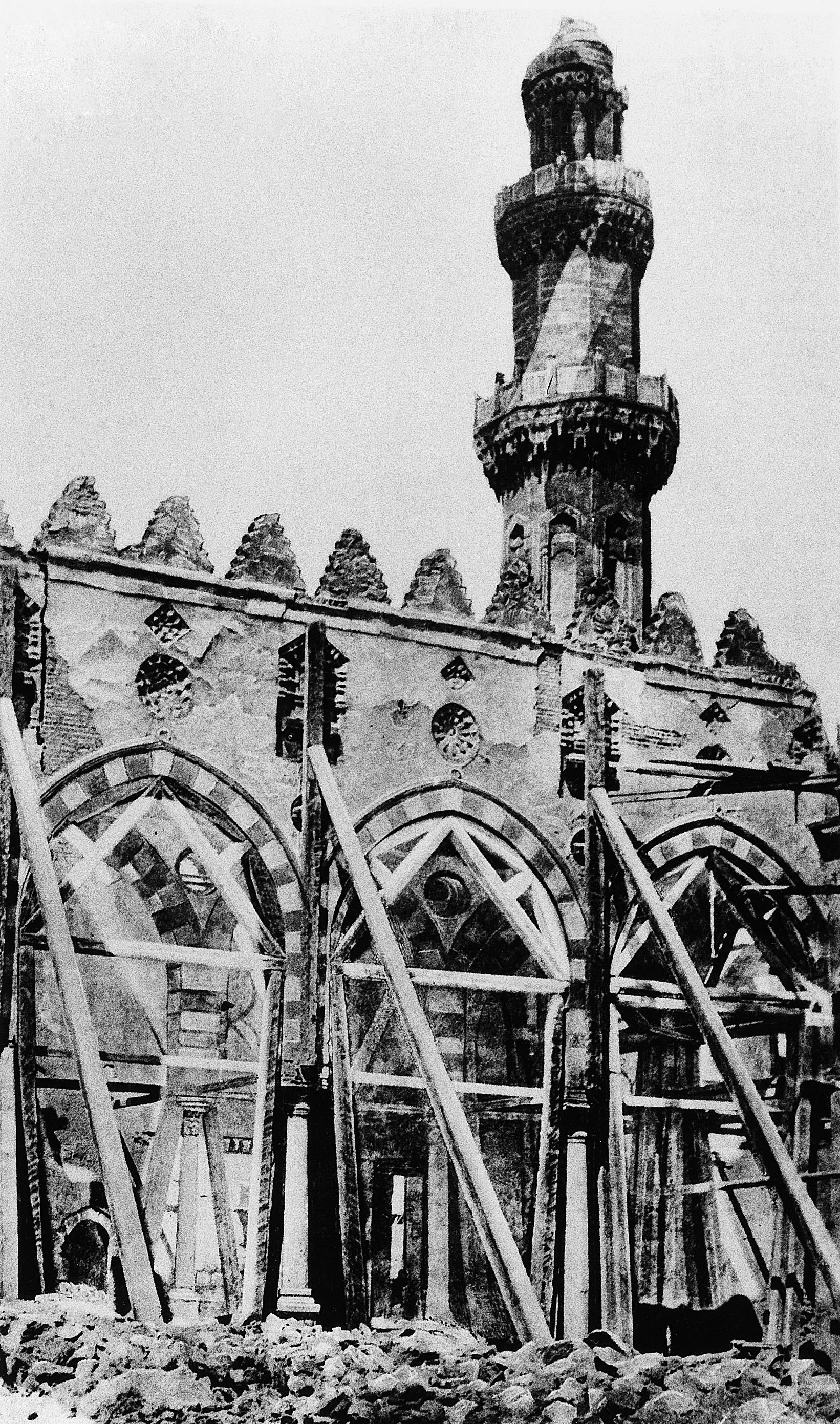
Courtyard of the mosque of the Amir al-Maridani during restoration.

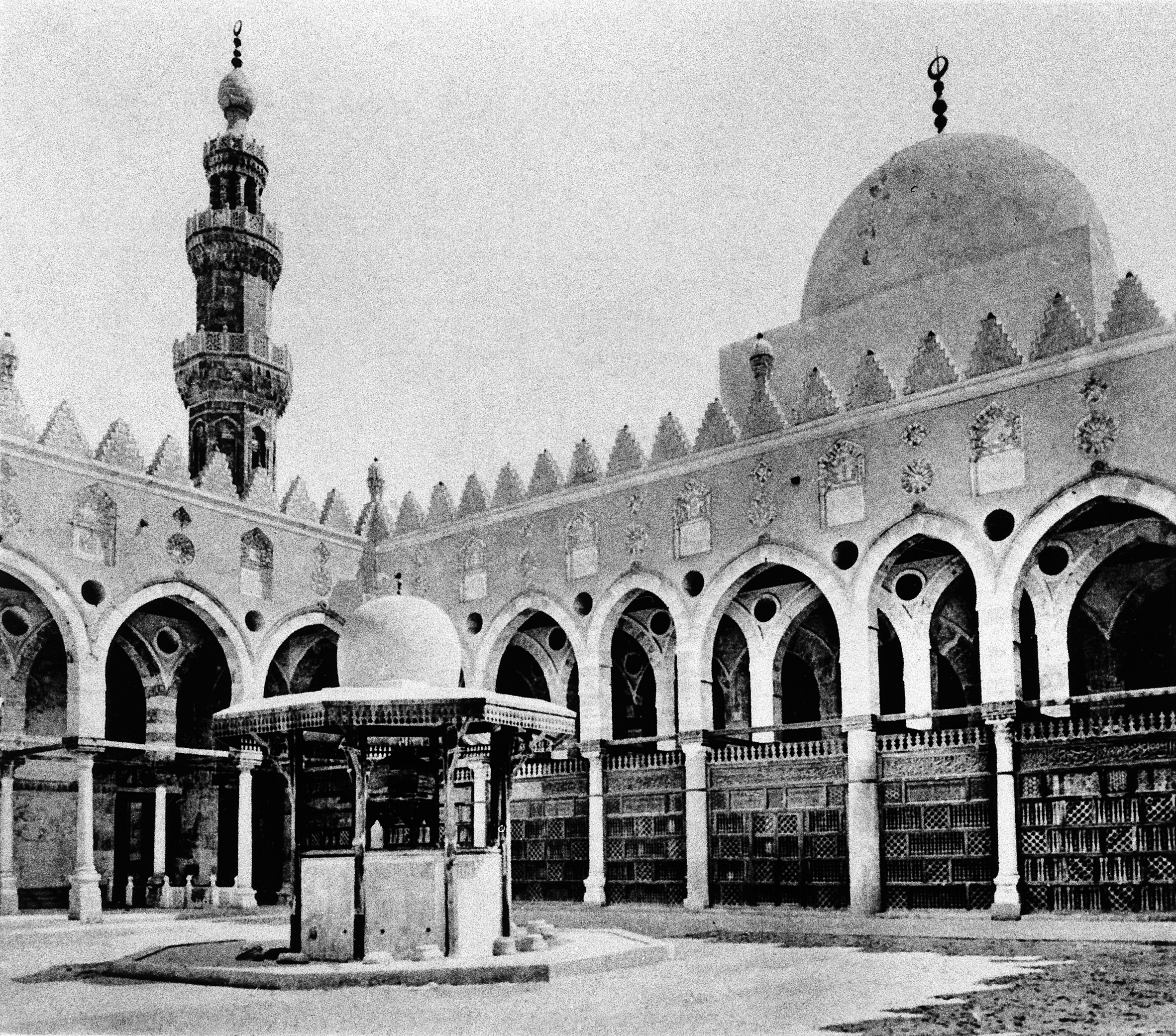
The courtyard of the mosque of the Amir al-Maridani after restoration.

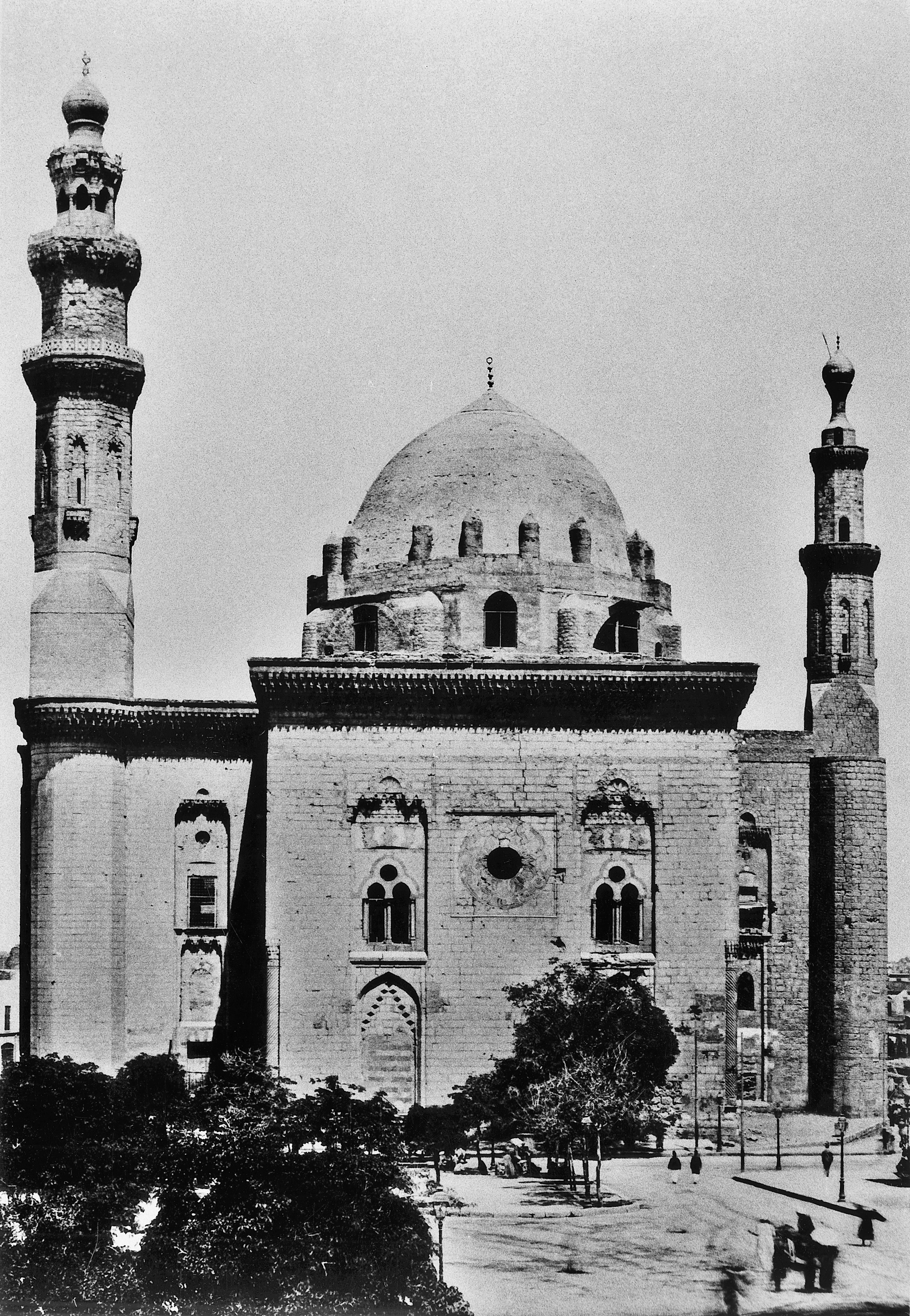
Sultan Hasan's madrasa-mosque before restoration.

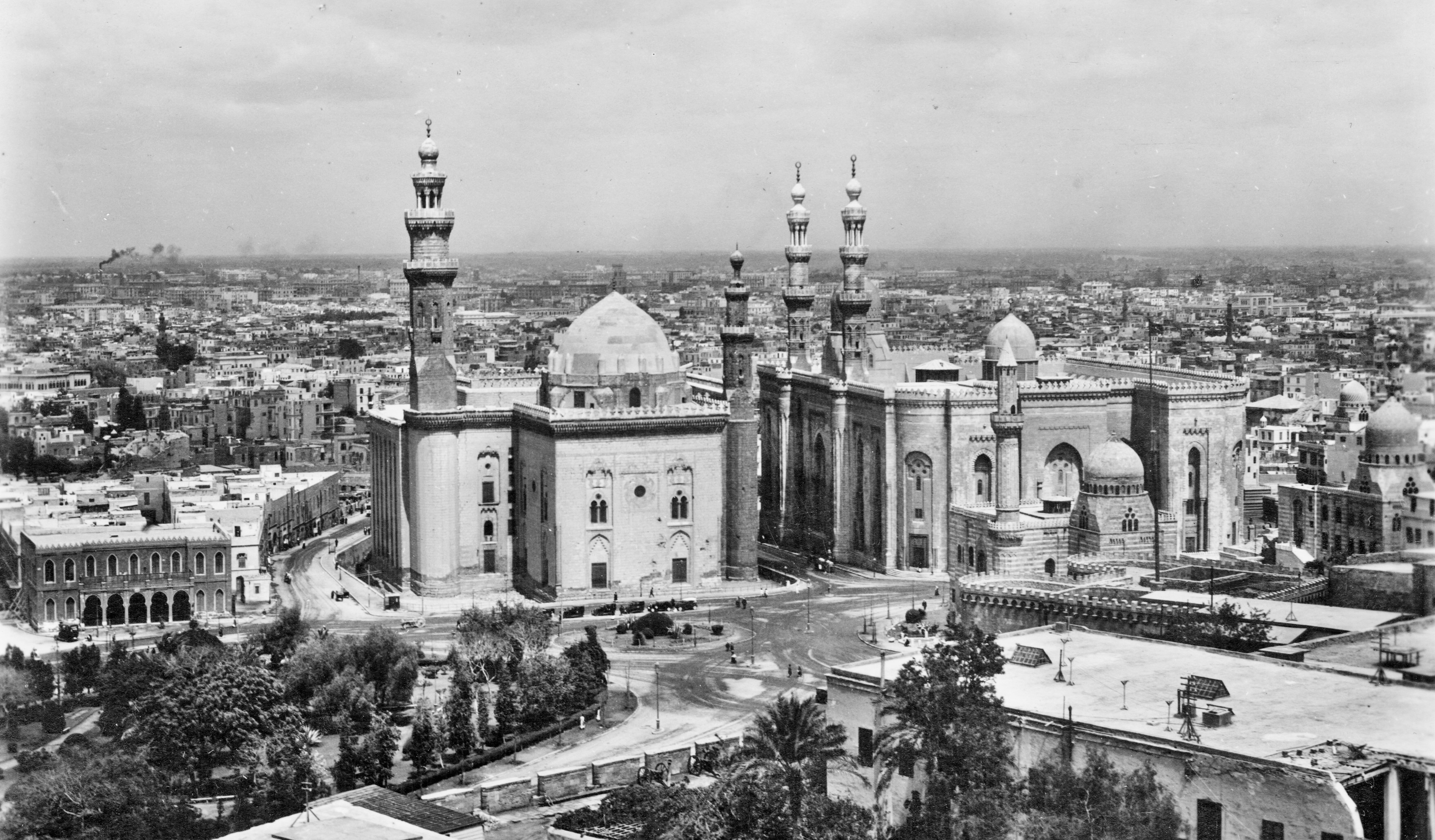
Sultan Hasan's madrasa-mosque after restoration with the Rifai mosque.

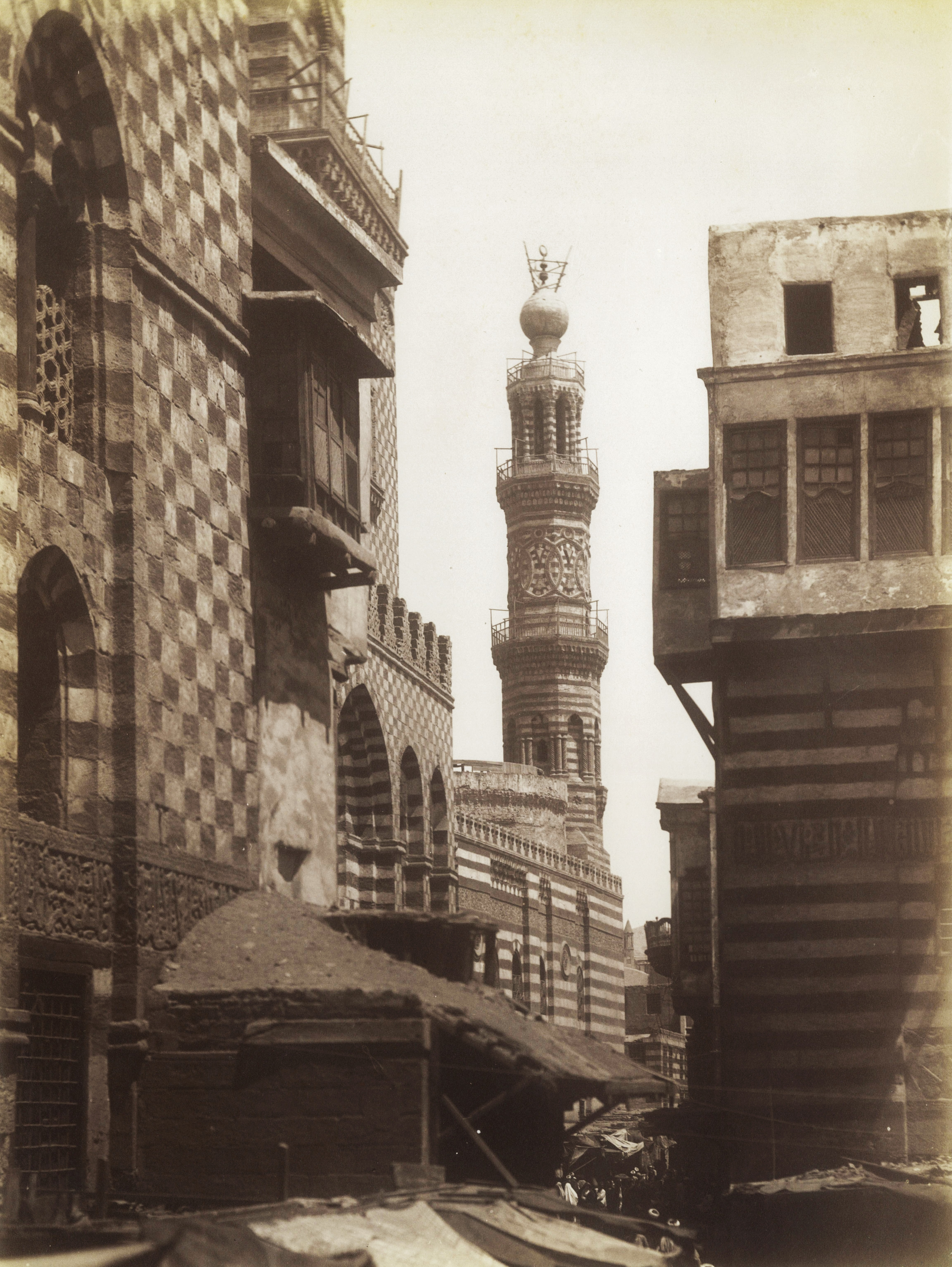
Sultan Barquq's madrasa-mosque before restoration.

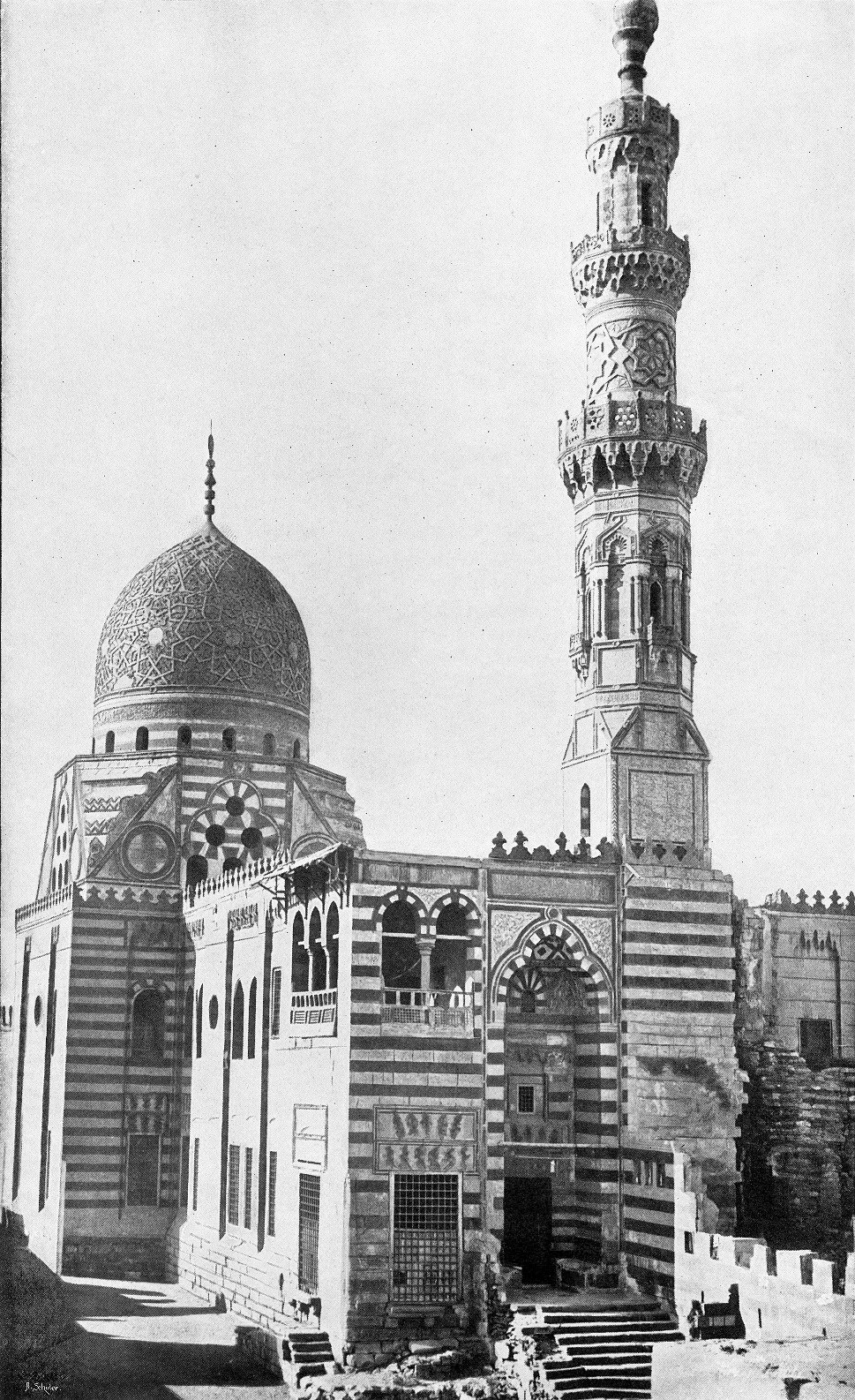
Sultan Qayitbay's funerary mosque before restoration.

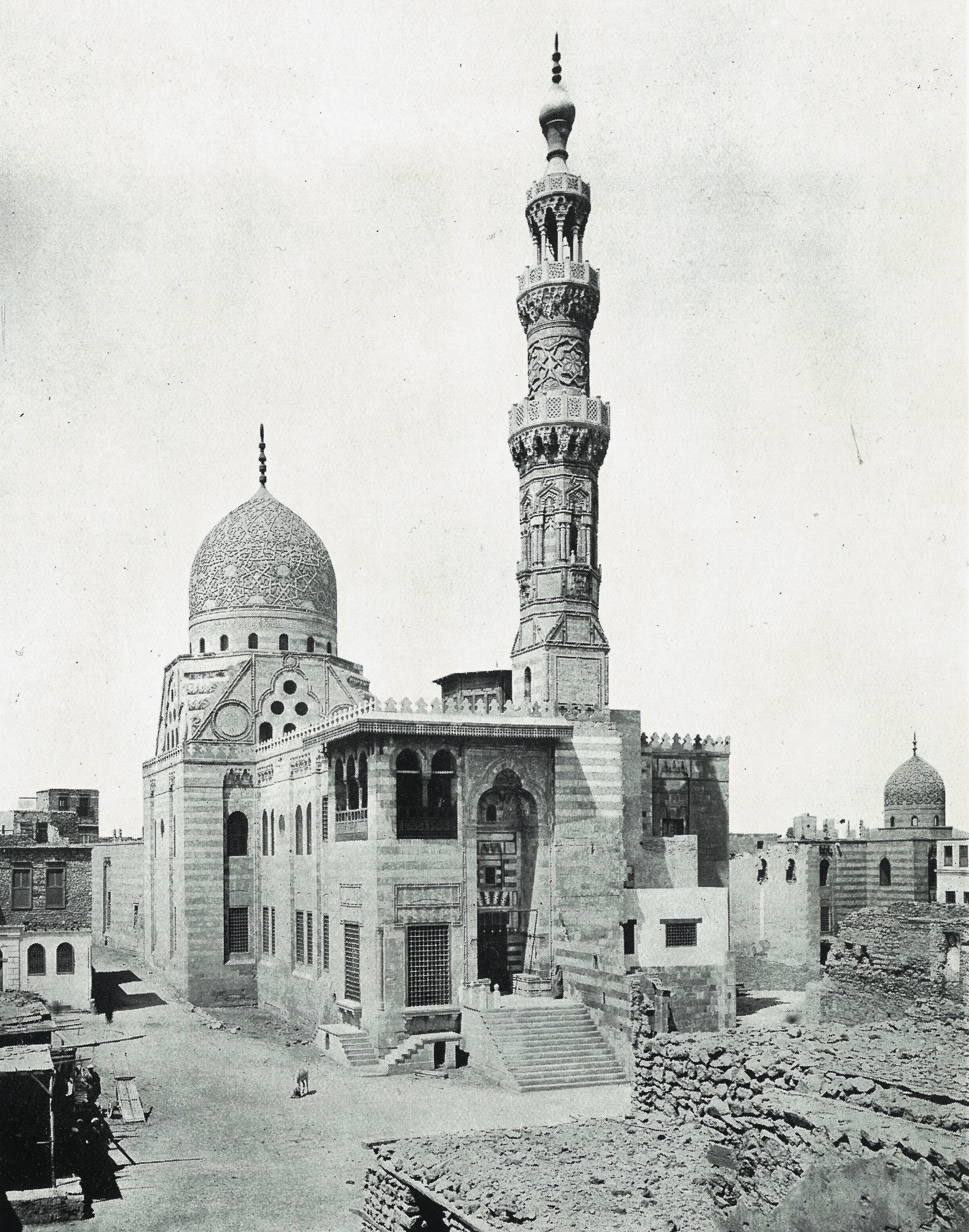
Sultan Qayitbay's funerary mosque after restoration.

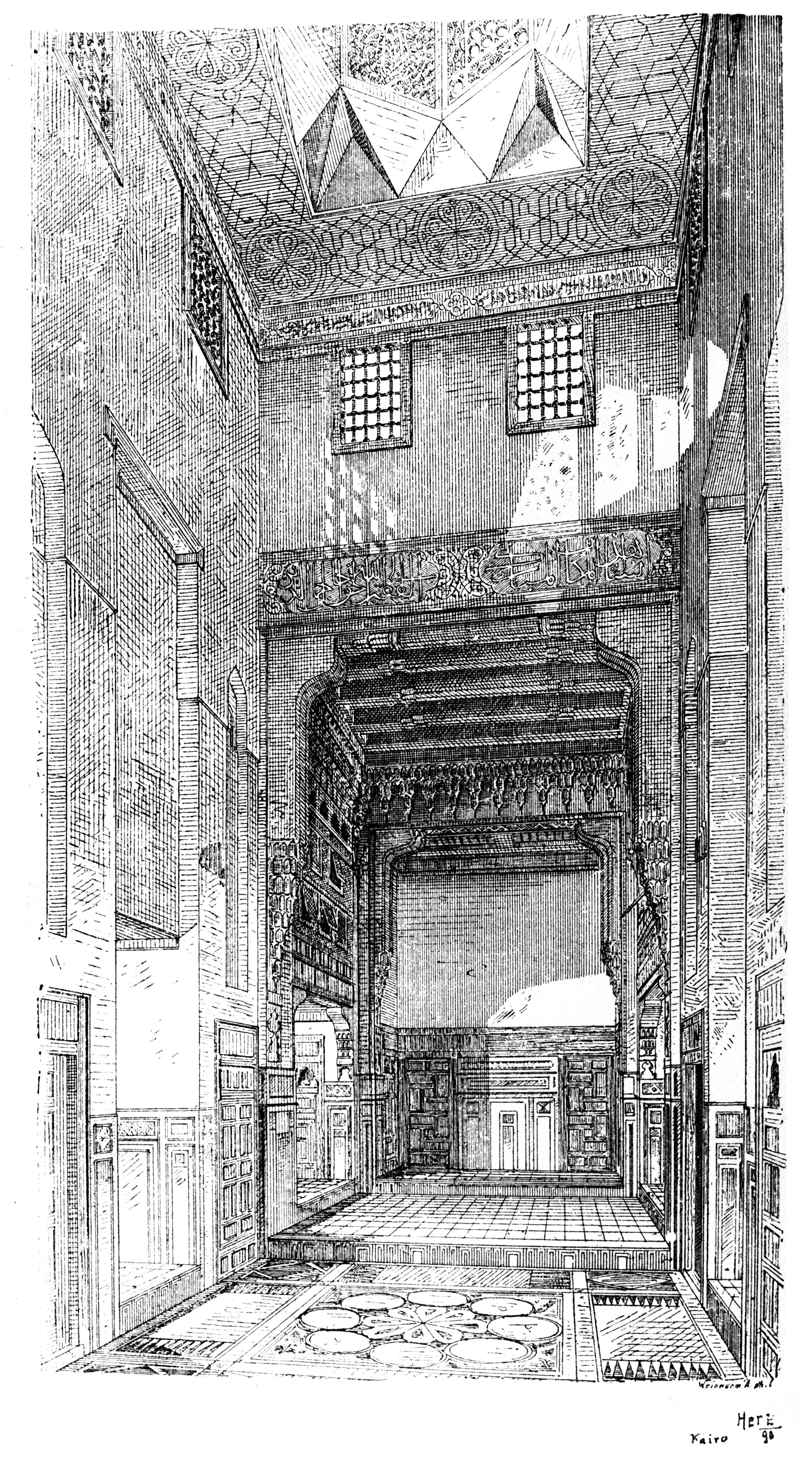
Gamal al-Din al-Dahabi's mansion; the hall after restoration.

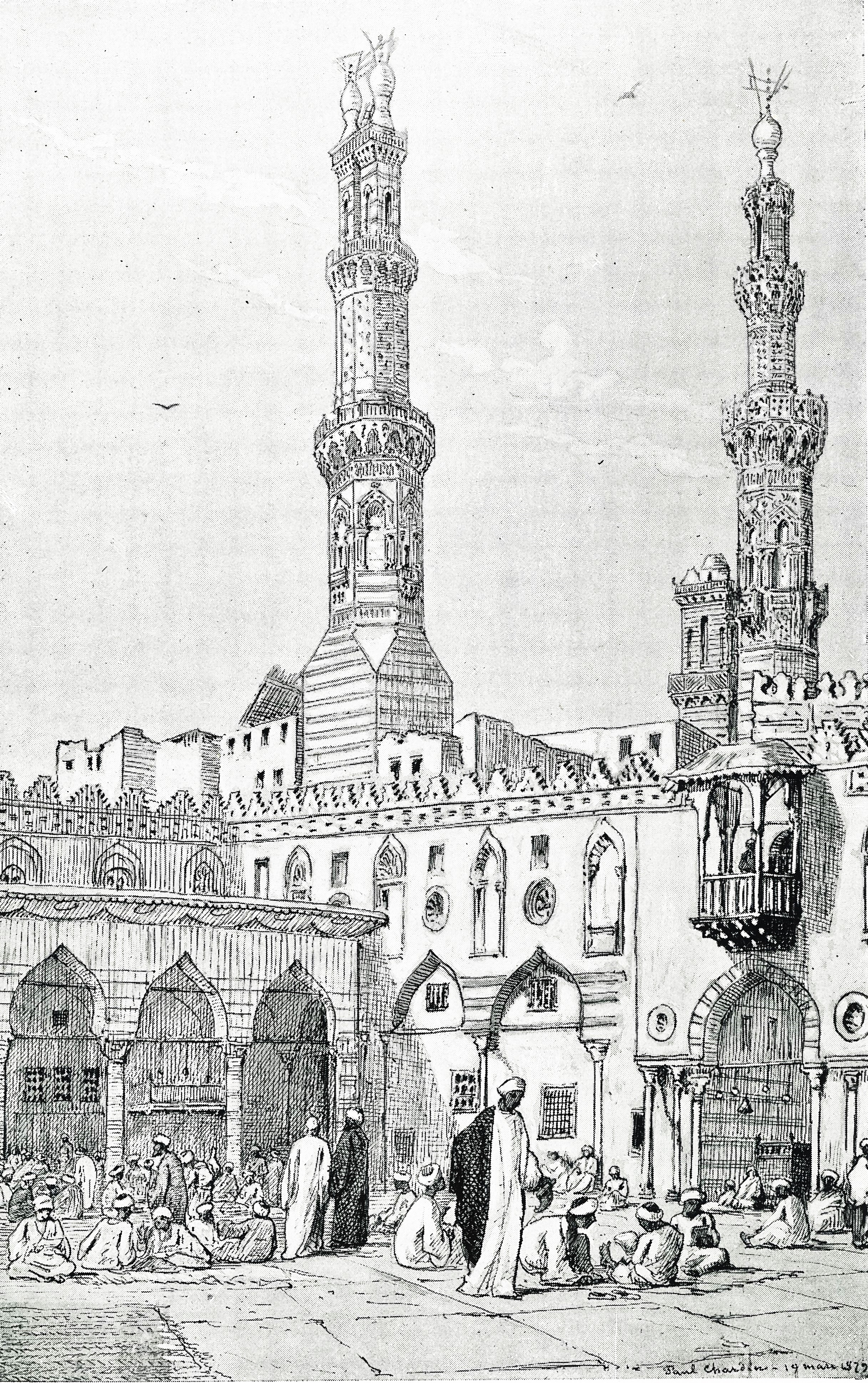
Courtyard of the Azhar mosque before restoration. Herz removed the late annex on the left and opened the walled-up arcades encircling the courtyard.

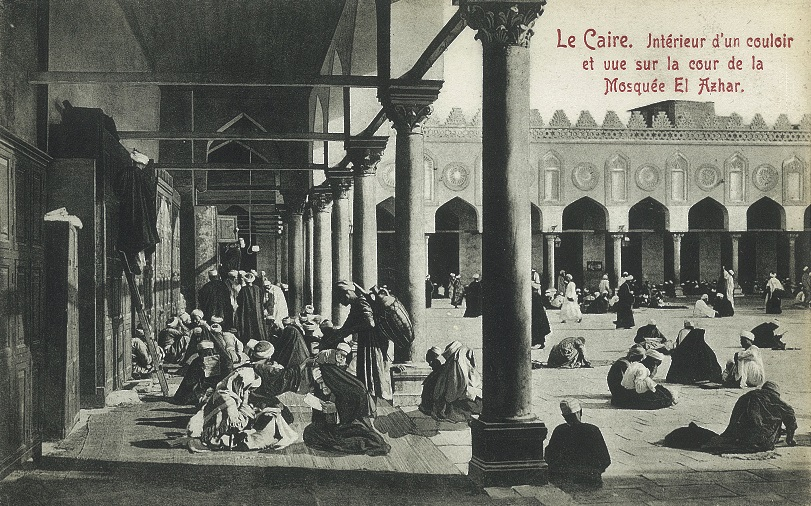
Courtyard of the Azhar mosque after restoration.

=== First Director of the Arab Museum ===
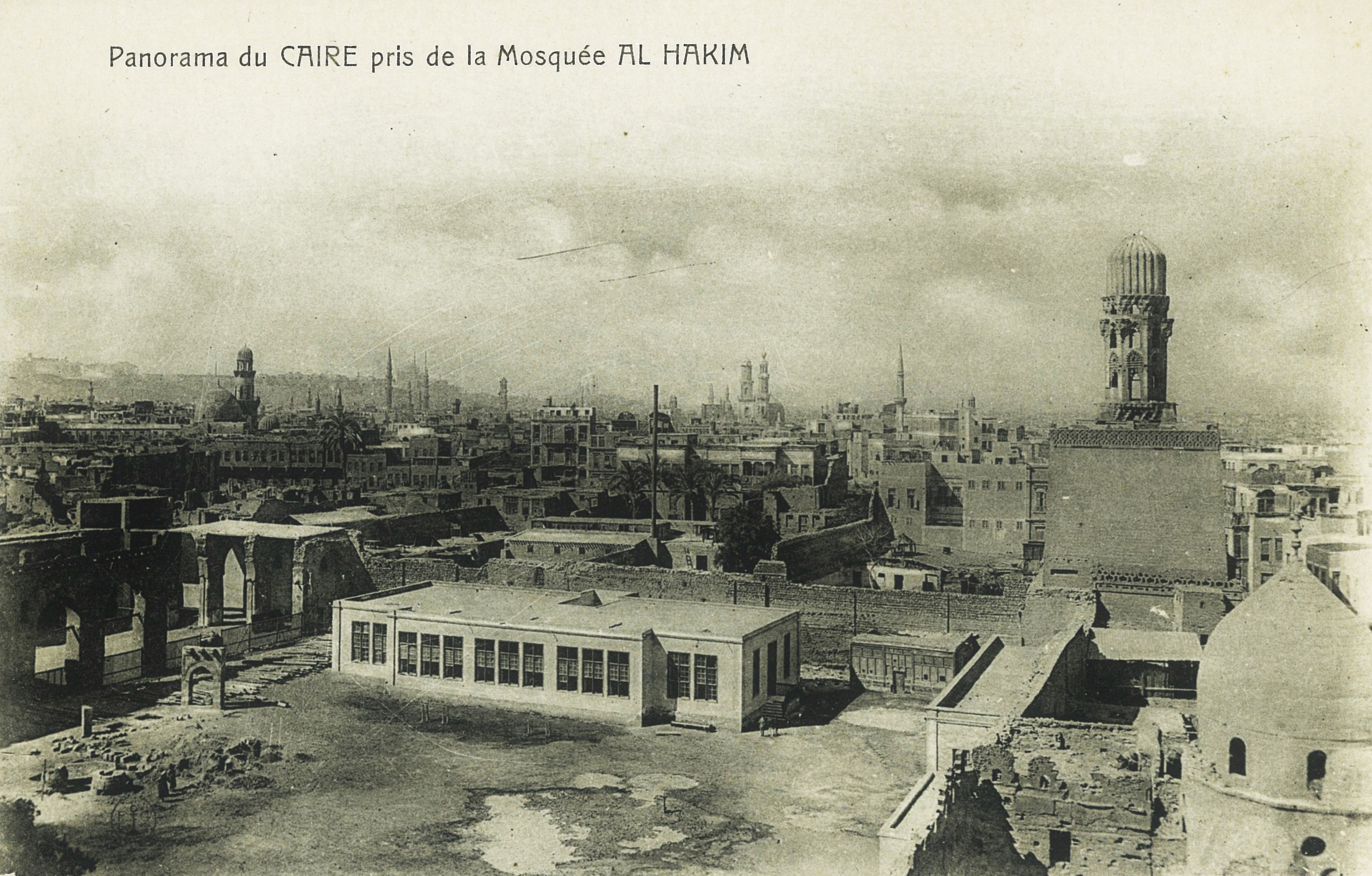
The old building of the Arab Museum in the ruinous mosque of al-Hakim.

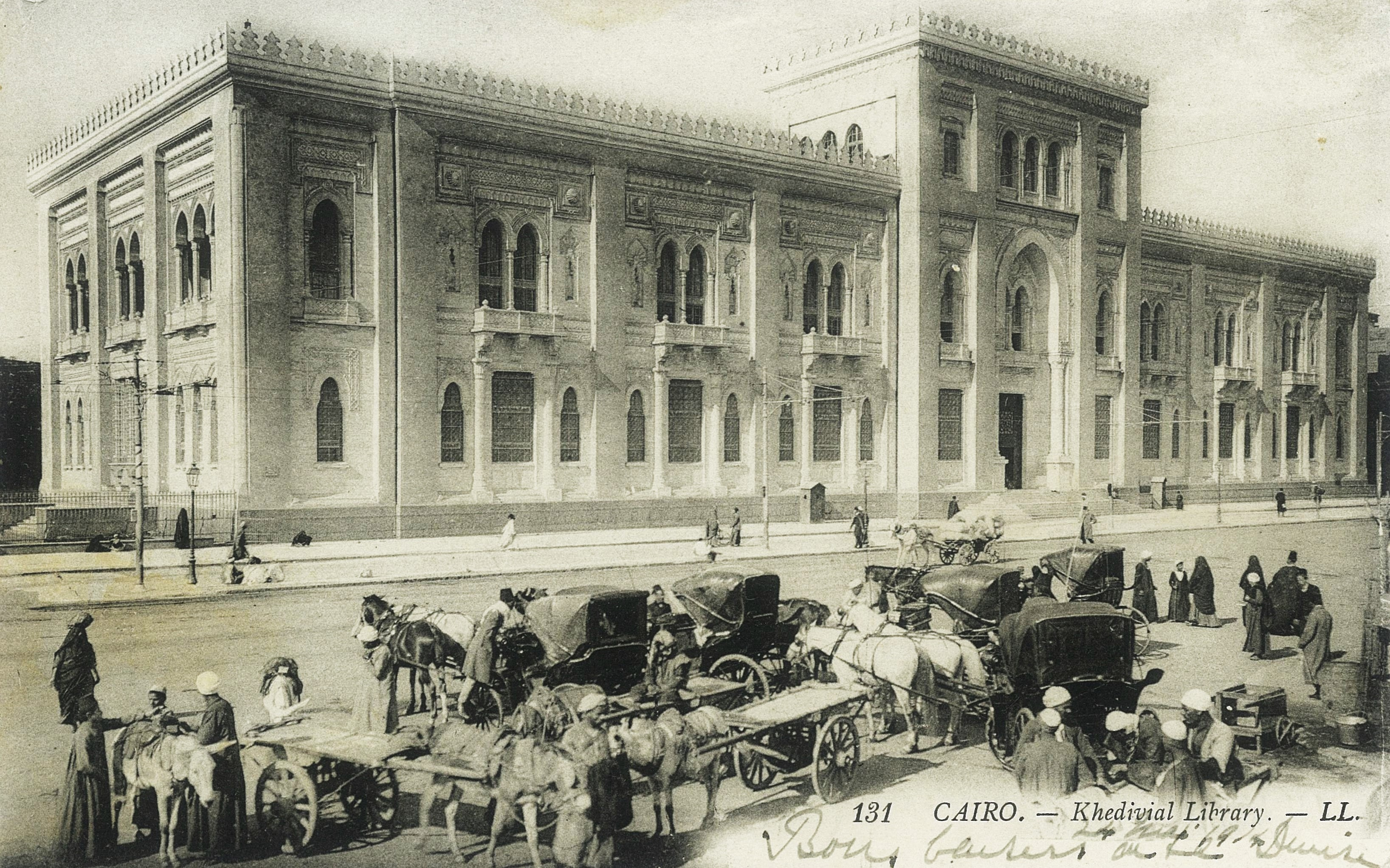
The new building of the Arab Museum.

In 1880 Khedive Tawfiq entrusted Julius Franz Pasha with the foundation of the Arab Museum (at present: Museum of Islamic Arts). In 1892 the Comité put Herz in charge of the museum, and in 1902 he was appointed director. This happened in connection with the inauguration of the new museum building designed by Alfonso Manescalco. Until then the museum collections were housed in temporary buildings in the ruinous al-Hakim mosque (380-403/990-1013); the post of director did not exist. Herz published the museum's catalogue in French in two editions; both were translated into English and the second edition also appeared in Arabic translation. In addition to descriptions of the objects, they contain a concise account of the history of Arab-Islamic art according to the fields represented in the museum's collections and thus they still possess eminent scholarly value on a general level.

=== The Foundation of the Coptic Museum ===
According to the current narrative the Coptic Museum in Old Cairo was founded by Marcus Simayka Pasha (1864–1944), an outstanding public figure in the Coptic community, a passionate lover of Coptic art, who subsequently held the post of director until the end of his life.

There can be no doubt that it was owing to his high competence, unflagging zeal and self-sacrificing efforts exerted in the course of long decades that the Coptic Museum evolved into the flourishing scholarly institution of world renown that we know today. However, as far as its foundation is concerned, contemporary documents do not seem to support the current narrative. In the most authentic version, which Simayka Pasha jotted down decades after the event, he describes in detail the circumstances under which he founded the museum in 1908 with the aim of saving valuable silver liturgical vessels which Patriarch Cyril V wanted to sell and when upon his suggestion the Patriarch assigned a room for the storage of objects of Coptic art worthy of preservation. However, it is recorded in the Comité Bulletins that the Patriarch assigned the room in question ten years earlier, and that upon Herz Pasha's request, when in his capacity of chief architect of the Comité Herz addressed an official letter on this subject to the Minister of Public Works and Public Education, Husayn Fakhri Pasha, which was read in the Comité's session on 4 January 1898. In the Comité's name, Herz and another Comité member, Hanna Bey Bakhum of the Coptic community, started discussions with the Patriarch, who subsequently assigned a room in the complex of the Muallaqa church (3rd c. AD) for this purpose. (Simayka Pasha was not a member of the Comité at that time.) Thus Herz must be regarded as the museum's founder. Herz's role is acknowledged by Gallini Fahmi (Qallini Fahmi) Pasha, an outstanding Coptic public servant, who served five sovereigns in his exceptionally long life and who always carefully followed events in the life of the Coptic community. In his memoirs written in the 1930s he pays great tribute to the achievements and boundless merits of Marcus Simayka Pasha in the unsurpassed development of the museum; nevertheless he explicitly names Herz as its founder. Elsewhere Marcus Simayka himself mentions another date and different circumstances: in 1920 and in 1929 he wrote that he had undertaken this step around 1895 and under completely different conditions. He never mentions Herz's letter of 1898 and the subsequent events. It seems that the museum's case made only little progress in the years before World War I and that real development ensued after the end of the war, under the directorship of Marcus Simayka Pasha, when the museum received a separate building of its own. It deserves to be mentioned that Herz's office prepared some plans for the building of the future Coptic Museum under his guidance in the years before the war but ultimately different plans were used. On a personal level, Herz and Simayka were on excellent, even confidential terms. In his memoirs Simayka expresses very positive views about Herz in his discussion of the Comité but never mentions him in connection with the Coptic Museum.

=== The private architect ===
Herz was also active as a private architect in Cairo, though we know little about his achievements in this field. The author of his Arabic obituary, who consulted his former colleagues and subordinates, mentions more than 150 buildings in Cairo in various styles: mainly in "the Arab style", but also in western styles, among others in the Gothic style. While this number cannot be regarded as inordinately high for the whole oeuvre of an architect – the Hungarian architect József Hild designed 917 buildings in the course of his career –, this number should be treated with reservation: Herz's unusually heavy workload in the Comité would not have left him much spare time and it is problematic too that only a few of them are known. Herz does not mention this subject in surviving documents. The biographies written by his wife after his death mention no more than a few buildings.

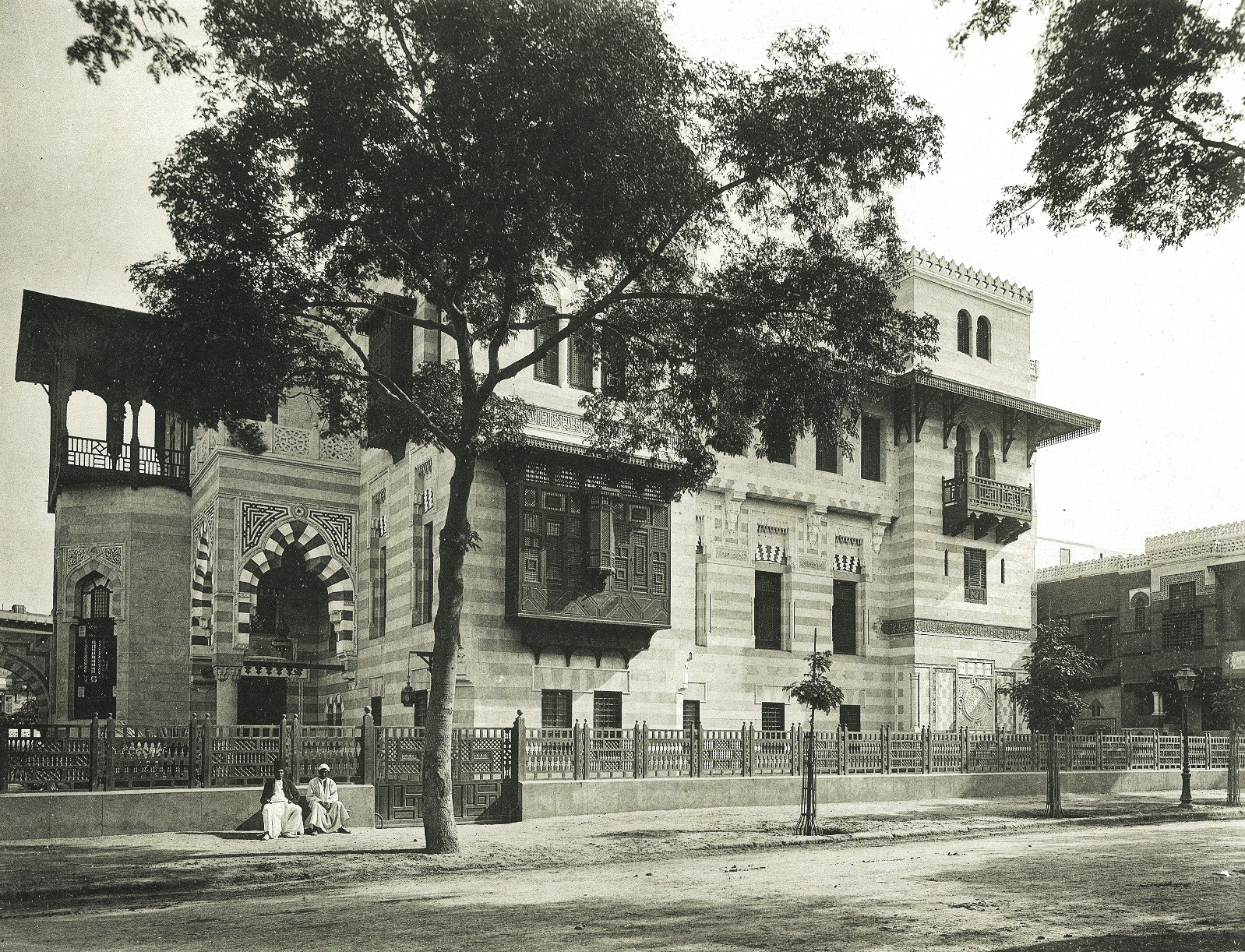
The Villa Zogheb.

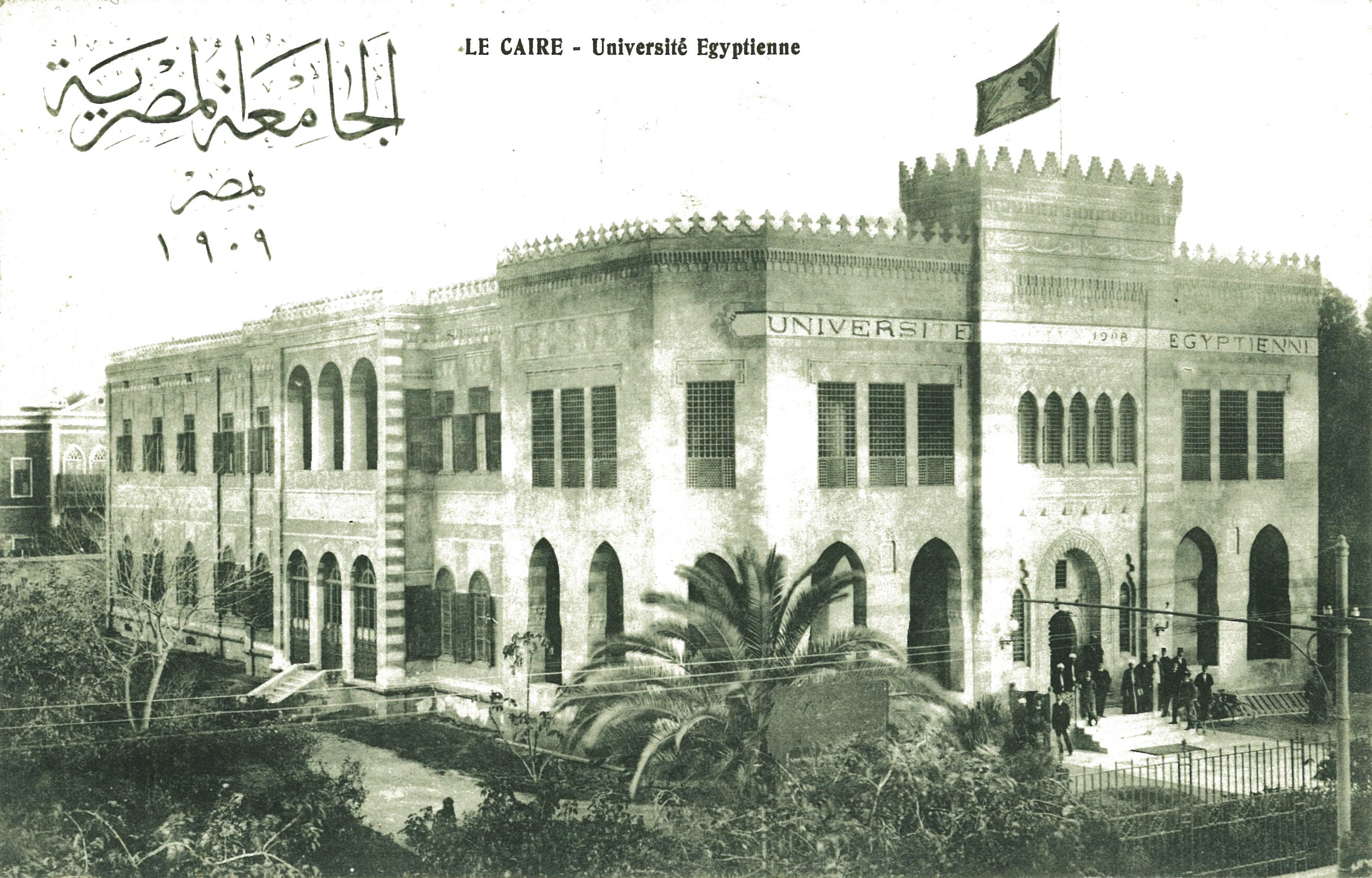
The Villa Gianaclis when it housed the newly founded Egyptian University as tenant. Postcard 1909. In 1919 the villa was acquired by the American University in Cairo.

Herz's name is closely connected to the "neo-Mamluk style". This architectural style, which was born in the context of the so-called neo-styles within the historicism then fashionable in Europe, revives the memory of the architecture of the Mamluk period, which saw Egypt as the greatest power in the Middle East and North Africa, with Cairo as her capital, a resplendent metropolis which had no equal in the known world. This style, which conjured up the memory of the country's glorious past, quickly became popular in Egypt, where it acquired the status of a national architectural style within the theoretical framework of a burgeoning nationalism.

Herz was regarded as the foremost authority on this style, although he had not invented it. (The expression "Arab style" above refers to this style.) In this style he erected the sumptuous palace of Count Zogheb, the consul of Denmark, in Qasr al-Nil Street; it was demolished in the 1960s. In the same quarter stood a palace which its new owner, the tobacco manufacturer Nestor Gianaclis, decided to have remodelled in the neo-Mamluk style, entrusting the task to Max Herz in 1898. The beautifully remodelled neo-Mamluk palace was acquired by the newly founded American University in Cairo in 1919: it is still standing as one of the university's central buildings in Tahrir Square.

In a similar vein, the Rifai mosque also represents the neo-Mamluk style. Its construction began around 1870 by the order of Khushyar hanim, the pious mother of Khedive Ismail, according to plans prepared by the Egyptian architect Husayn Fahmi. Work stopped around 1880 due to technical problems and a shortage of funds. A quarter of a century later, in 1906, Khedive Abbas II Hilmi entrusted Max Herz with the completion of the gigantic edifice opposite the grandiose mosque of Sultan Hasan (757-764/1356-1362). As far as possible, Herz strove to follow the ideas of the architect, to whom he had been connected by personal ties too, but in many cases he had to rely upon his own expertise and invention because the original plans were not extant and in many cases the concepts of the architect were not known. The completion of the superb mosque, which also served as the burial place of members of the Khedivial family, represented a great personal and professional success for Max Herz. It was in connection with this work that the Khedive promoted him to the next grade in the civil service. As holder of one of the top grades, he became entitled to use the honorary title "Pasha" from then on; until then he used the honorary title "Bey".

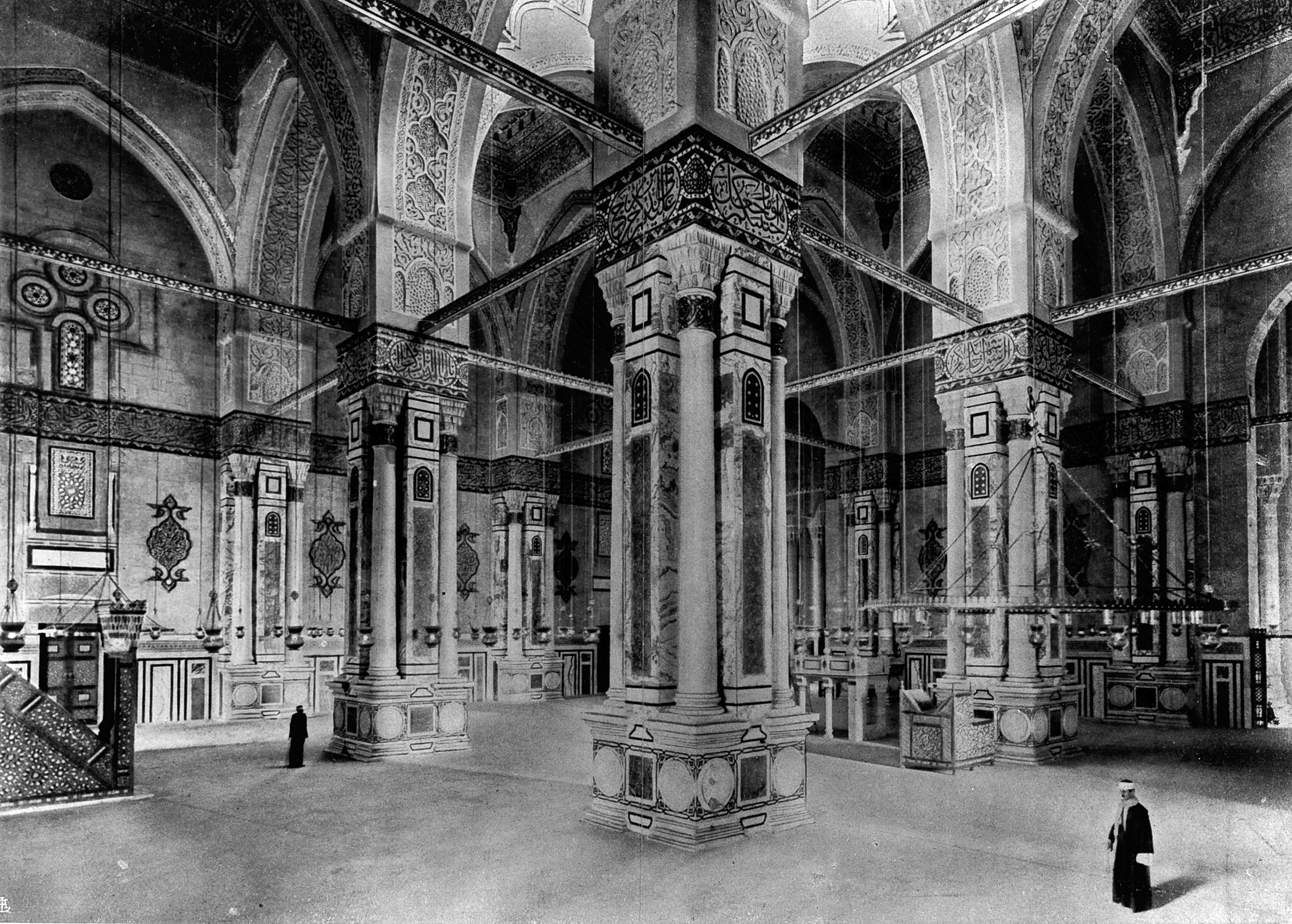
Interior of the Rifai mosque.

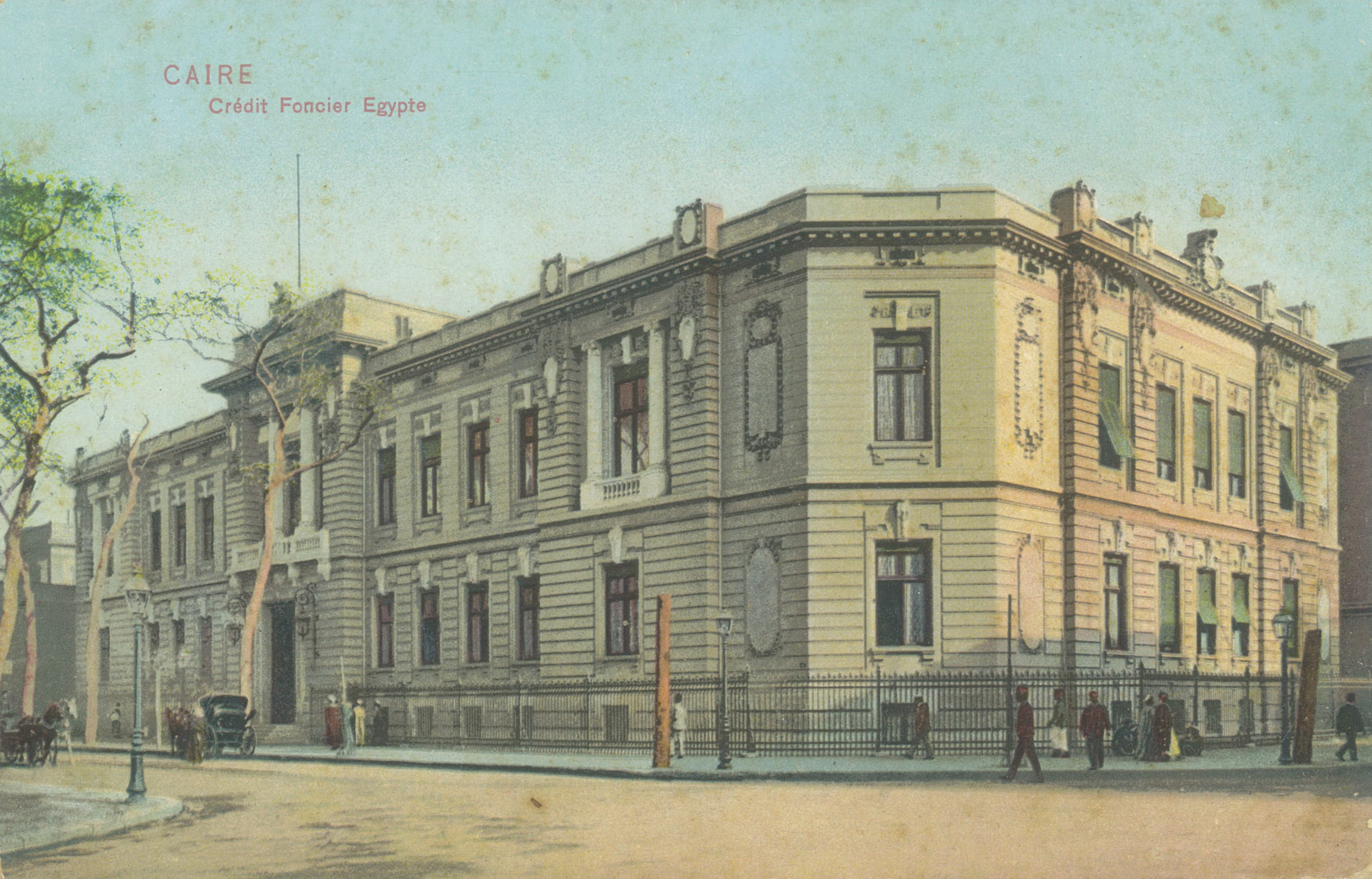
The building of the Crédit Foncier Égyptien.

Vague neo-Mamluk references could be detected on his own villa, which was built according to his own designs at 19 Shaykh Barakat (now Kamal al-Din Salah) Street behind Tahrir Square; the villa was demolished long ago.

Herz built the head office of the former Crédit Foncier Égyptien on the corner of today's Abd al-Khaliq Tharwat and Muhammad Bey Farid Streets in downtown Cairo in the Beaux-Arts style following the designs of Carlo Prampolini. The building is still standing.

In cooperation with Anton Battigelli, in 1898 Herz carried out extension work on the building of the Austro-Hungarian "Rudolf" Hospital (Ospedale Rodolfo in contemporary parlance) in the Abbasiyya quarter (9a Sharia al-Masud off Midan Abduh Basha). The building, of modest quality, has been remodelled several times since; in 1997 it was the property of the Faggala Evangelical Church and housed an outpatients' clinic, a vocational training centre, a Christian club and offices.

The "Cairo Street" at the World's Columbian Exposition of 1893 in Chicago was designed by Max Herz and he also supervised the final stage of its erection on the spot. It was not the copy of any street actually in existence in Cairo but an architectural complex made of temporary materials modelled on typical Cairene buildings or parts of them to evoke the atmosphere of the Middle-Eastern metropolis. In order to enhance the authenticity of the Street, a great number of typical inhabitants of Cairo as well as animals (camels, donkeys and snakes) were also brought to Chicago to populate the complex. The idea was not new; it represented a project type which was popular at the time. Nor was it the first Cairo Street at world's expositions. However, what made it unique as compared to its counterparts was the high level of the designs and the execution. The public loved it; it was generally regarded as the most popular project at the World's Columbian Exposition.

== Major publications ==
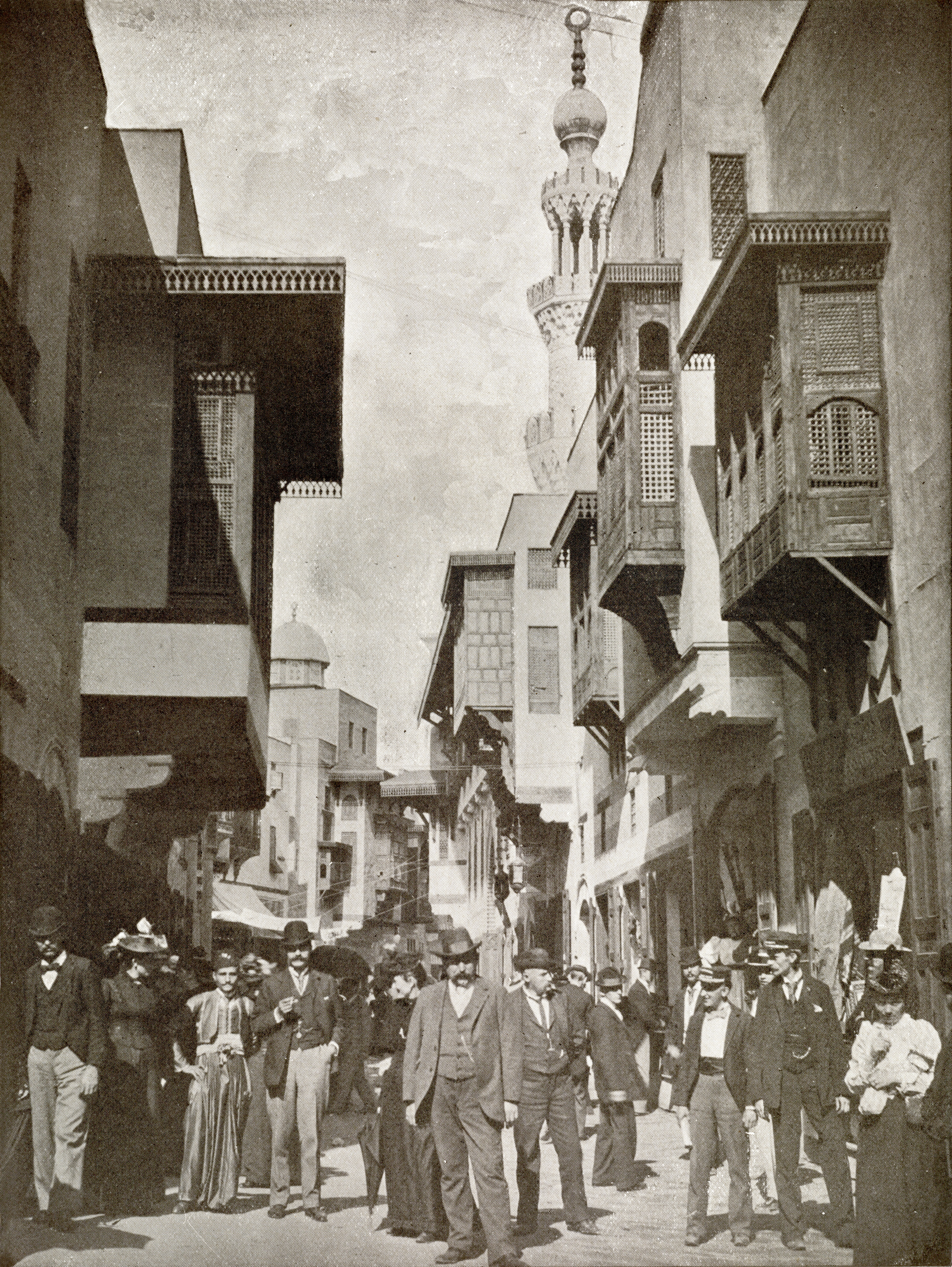
Cairo Street at the World's Columbian Exposition of 1893 in Chicago.

Max Herz was a historian of architecture but his workload at the Comité did not allow him to develop his capacities in this field fully. His publications include the following:

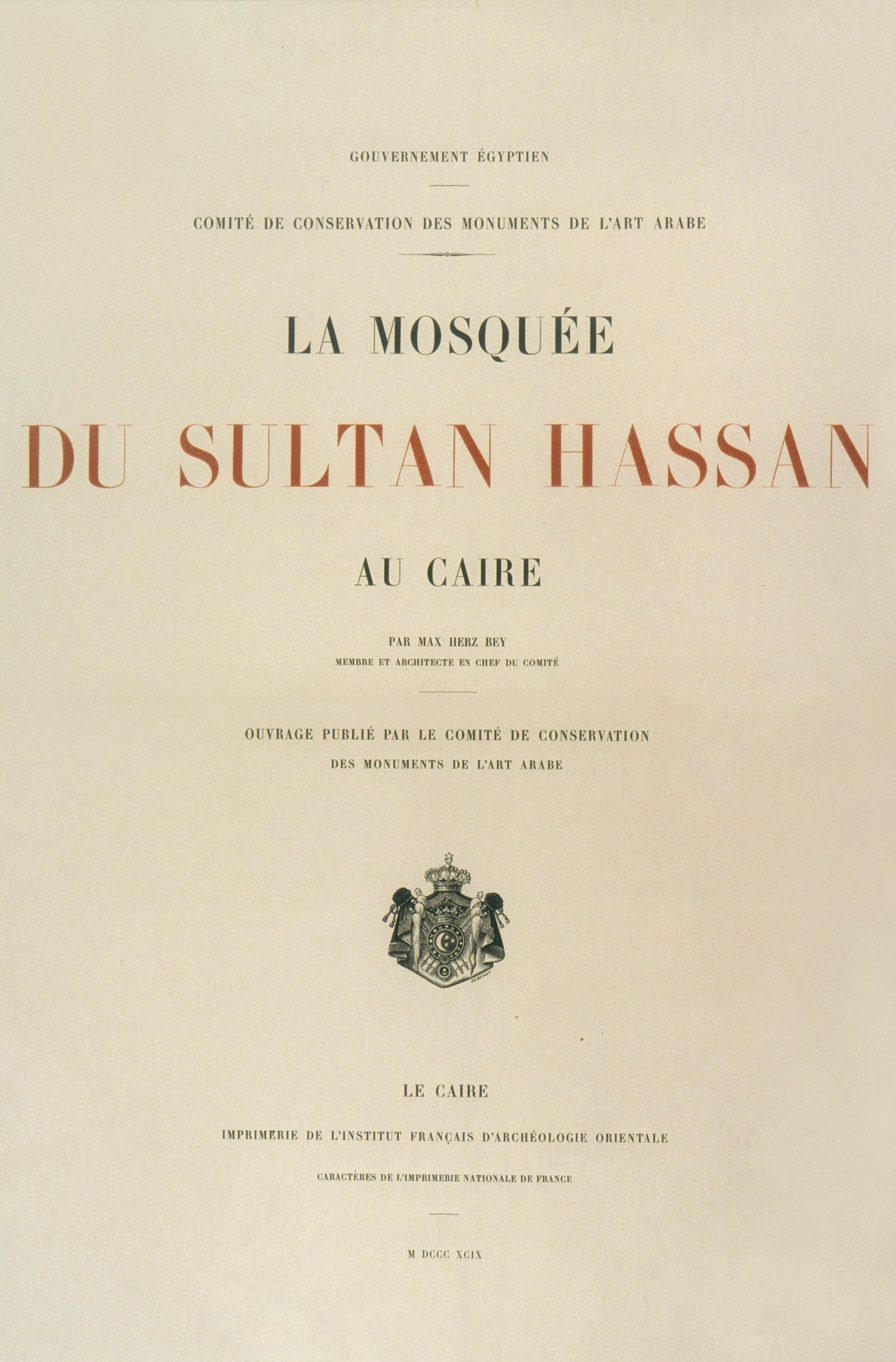
Title page of the monograph on Sultan Hasan's mosque.

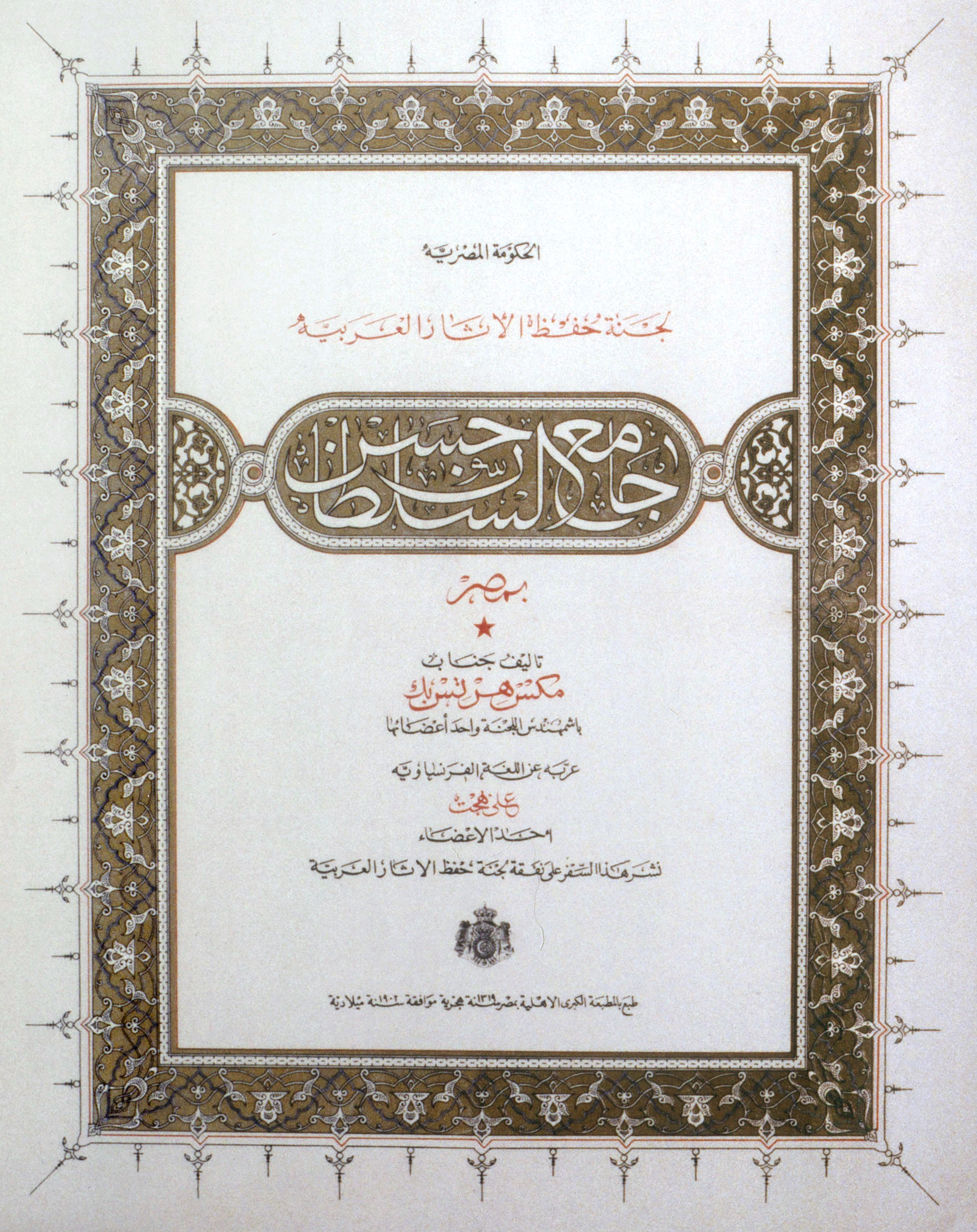
Title page of the Arabic edition of the monograph on Sultan Hasan's mosque.

1. With the aim of launching an early type of "media campaign" to pave the way for the complete reconstruction of one of the most important monuments of Arab-Islamic architecture in Cairo and perhaps in the whole Islamic world, in 1899 he published a folio-size monograph on the mosque of Sultan Hasan (757-764/1356-1362). It retains its importance to this day:
  - Max Herz: La mosquée du Sultan Hassan au Caire. Institut Français d'Archéologie Orientale, Cairo, 1899; http://www.islamic-art.org/OnlineBooks/index.asp; in 1902 an Arabic translation came out, which was republished in diminished size in Cairo in 2009.
2. He devoted a seminal monograph, which appeared posthumously, to one of the most interesting and remarkable architectural monuments in Cairo, the complex of Sultan Qalaun (683-684/1284-1285; mausoleum, madrasa-mosque, hospital):
  - Max Herz: Die Baugruppe des Sultāns Qalāūn in Kairo. (Abhandlungen des Hamburgischen Kolonialinstituts 42, Reihe B. Völkerkunde, Kulturgeschichte und Sprachen, 22), L. Friederichsen, Hamburg, 1919. https://archive.org/stream/diebangruppedess00herzuoft#page/n5/mode/2up; In view of his long involvement with this splendid complex there was truly nobody more qualified to write a monograph on it, yet the circumstances of its genesis prevented him from accomplishing this task in accordance with his gifts and abilities. He wrote it in exile in Switzerland, without access to the Comité archives, its library and collection of photographs, his own papers and photographs, and he was deprived of the blessings of a good specialist library also.
3. His succinct account of the history of Arab-Islamic art in Hungarian can still be perused with great profit. He concentrates on the art of Cairo, subsequently extending his view towards the distant horizons of the Islamic world:
  - Herz Miksa: Az Iszlám művészete [The art of Islam], A művészetek története a legrégibb időktől a XIX. század végéig [The history of the arts from the earliest times until the end of the 19th century], ed. Zsolt Beöthy. Lampel R. (Wodianer F. és fia), Budapest, 1906–1912, vol. II [1907], pp. 108–262 (183 illustrations).
4. As mentioned above, Herz published the catalogue of the Arab Museum in Cairo in French in two editions, then both in English translation and the second edition also in Arabic:
  - Max Herz: Catalogue sommaire des monuments exposés dans le Musée National de l'Art Arabe. G. Lekegian, Cairo, 1895. https://archive.org/stream/cataloguesommai00herzgoog#page/n9/mode/2up
  - Max Herz: Catalogue of the National Museum of Arab Art, transl. Stanley Lane-Poole. Gilbert and Rivington, Bernard Quaritch, London, n.d. [1896]. (https://archive.org/details/catalogueofnatio00mathrich)
  - Max Herz: Catalogue raisonné des monuments exposés dans le Musée National de l'Art Arabe. 2. ed. Institut Français d'Archéologie Orientale, Cairo, 1906. (https://archive.org/details/catalogueraisonn00cairuoft) https://archive.org/stream/catalogueraisonn00cairuoft#page/n5/mode/2up
  - Max Herz: A descriptive catalogue of the objects exhibited in the National Museum of Arab Art, transl. G. Foster Smith. 2. ed. National Printing Department, Cairo, 1907. (https://archive.org/details/adescriptivecat00egygoog)
  - Maks Hirts: Fihris muqtanayat Dar al-Athar al-Arabiyya, transl. Ali Bahgat. Al-Matbaa al-Amiriyya, Cairo, 1909.
5. On the occasion of the inauguration of the Rifai mosque (1287-1330/1870-1912) he published a small monograph on its history:
  - Max Herz: La mosquée el-Rifaï au Caire, Humbert Allegretti, Milan, n.d. [1911]. http://www.islamic-art.org/OnlineBooks/BArchViewPage.asp?BookID=747&PO=1#viewpage; https://archive.org/stream/lamosqueelrifa00herz#page/n9/mode/2up; https://archive.org/details/lamosqueelrifa00herz
6. During his long term of office Max Herz edited and mostly wrote himself the Comité Bulletins (1890–1914) in French, which were also published in Arabic translation. They constitute a succinct data store on the Arab-Islamic and Coptic architecture of Egypt and especially of Cairo. In 1914 Herz also published an index to volumes 1882–1910, thus rendering a great service to readers in providing them with relatively easy access to this invaluable source, which is otherwise very difficult to use; a similar index to later volumes never appeared:
  - Max Herz: Index général des Bulletins du Comité des années 1882 à 1910. Institut Français d'Archéologie Orientale, Cairo, 1914. A (nearly) complete series of the Bulletins, including the Index, is accessible on the internet now: https://web.archive.org/web/20130910024306/http://islamic-art.org/comitte/Comite.asp

== Hungarian connections ==
Herz had close connections with Hungary throughout his life; he visited his native country several times. He kept his Hungarian citizenship until his death. He could have retained his office and remained in Egypt if he had renounced his Hungarian citizenship following the outbreak of World War I. He regarded Egypt as his second homeland ("ma seconde patrie") and devoted all his active life to her, yet it was inconceivable for him to sever the most important bond between him and his native country. Herz left Hungary for good at the age of 21 – of course he was not aware of this at the time –, so one might not have been surprised if the memory of his native country had faded in his mind over the long decades he spent away from home. However, it was not so: he remained a proud Hungarian patriot throughout his life. When he died, his wife wrote about his illness and death in the emotional style of the period: "The silent struggle lasted four years and a half. Looking death straight in the face with noble calmness of mind, he remained to his last breath a caring husband, a tender father to his daughters, and a true son – consumed by sorrow and grief – of his dearly beloved Hungarian fatherland." (The "sorrow and grief" refer to Herz Pasha's anxiety about Hungary's fate under the Hungarian Soviet Republic [ 21 March to 1 August 1919] and the impending territorial losses resulting from Hungary's defeat in World War I.) He had close connections with Hungarian institutions, above all with the Hungarian Academy of Sciences and the Museum of Applied Arts. The former elected him external member in 1896, while to the latter he made important donations over the years. He cultivated his ties to Temesvár, where he spent his early youth and where his elder sister, Katalin lived, who had affectionately cared for him in his childhood after the untimely loss of their mother. Herz donated a number of pharaonic objects to the Historical and Archeological Museum of Southern Hungary in Temesvár (since 1920 Banat Museum [Muzeul Banatului], Timişoara, Romania). The letters which he wrote to his friend Ignaz Goldziher (Budapest) from his exile in Switzerland show an increased affection and nostalgia for Hungary. Herz submitted articles to Hungarian journals (Budapesti Szemle [Budapest Review], Művészi Ipar [Applied Art]) and published one of his major works, an account of the history of Islamic art, in Hungarian (see "Major publications, 3"). Franz Joseph, Emperor of Austria and King of Hungary, conferred two orders upon Herz. In 1912, the Hungarian Government initiated the official procedure of raising Herz to Hungarian nobility in recognition of his eminent services. The process was halted by the outbreak of World War I.

== Bibliography ==
- Hasan Abd al-Wahhab: Tarikh al-masagid al-athariyya. 2. ed. Al-Haya al-Misriyya al-Amma li-l-Kitab, Cairo, 1994. ISBN 977-01-3703-0.
- Ludwig Borchardt: Max Herz-Pascha†. Zentralblatt der Bauverwaltung 39, 1919, p. 368.
- Ignaz Goldziher: Herz Miksa. Budapesti Szemle 179, 1919, pp. 228–233.
- Alaa El-Habashi: Athar to monuments: The interventions of the Comité de Conservation des Monuments de l'Art Arabe. PhD diss., University of Pennsylvania, 2001.
- Tawfiq Iskarus: Maks Hirts Basha wa-fadluhu fi hifz al-athar al-arabiyya. Al-Hilal 27, 1919, no. 10 (July 1919), pp. 921–928.
- István Ormos: Preservation and restoration. The methods of Max Herz Pasha, chief architect of the Comité de Conservation des Monuments de l'Art Arabe, 1890–1914. In: Historians in Cairo. Essays in honor of George Scanlon, ed. Jill Edwards. The American University in Cairo Press, Cairo-New York, 2002, pp. 123–153. ISBN 977-424-701-9
- István Ormos: Max Herz Pasha 1856–1919. His life and career. (Études Urbaines 6/1-2), Institut Français d'Archéologie Orientale, Cairo, 2009. ISBN 978-2-7247-0508-9.
- István Ormos: Herz, Max (Miksa). In: Allgemeines Künstlerlexikon. E. A. Seemann, K. G. Saur, De Gruyter, Leipzig, München, Berlin, 1969–, vol. 72 [2012], pp. 449–450. ISBN 978 3 598 22740 0.
- István Ormos: Max Herz Pasha on Arab-Islamic art in Egypt. In: Le Caire dessiné et photographié au XIX^{e} siècle, ed. Mercedes Volait. Picard, Paris, 2013, pp. 311–342. ISBN 978-2-7084-0941-5.
- Philipp Speiser: Die Geschichte der Erhaltung arabischer Baudenkmäler in Ägypten. (Abhandlungen des Deutschen Archäologischen Instituts Kairo, Islamische Reihe, 8), Heidelberger Orientverlag, Heidelberg, 2001. ISBN 3-927552-27-5.
- Nicholas Warner: The monuments of Historic Cairo. A map and descriptive catalogue. (American Research Center in Egypt Conservation Series, 1; An American Research Center in Egypt Edition), The American University in Cairo Press, Cairo-New York, 2005. ISBN 977-424-841-4.
