= Grăniceri =

- Commune
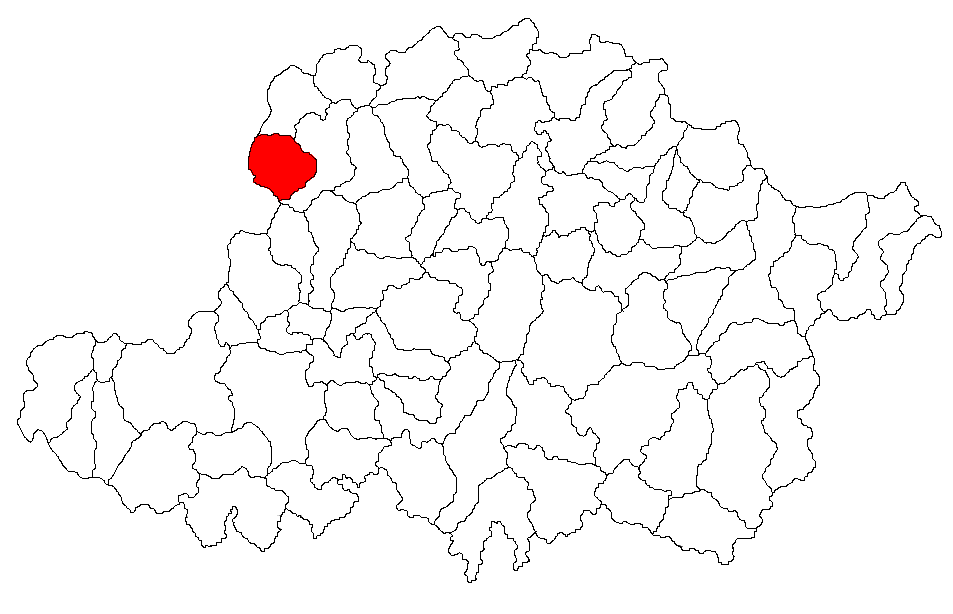
- Location in Arad County

- Location in Romania
- Coordinates: 46°31′N 21°18′E
- Country: Romania
- County: Arad
- Population (2021-12-01): 2,203
- Time zone: EET/EEST (UTC+2/+3)
- Vehicle reg.: AR

Grăniceri (Hungarian: Ottlaka, Serbian: Graničar) is a commune in Arad County, Romania, is situated on the Crișurilor Plain, at the western border of Romania. The commune stretches over 7,900 hectares (20,000 acres) and is composed of two villages, Grăniceri (situated at 61 km from Arad) and Șiclău (Sikló).

== Population ==
According to the last census the population of the commune counts 2596 inhabitants. From an ethnic point of view it has the following structure: 89.7% are Romanians, 1.3% Hungarians, 7.4% Roma, 1.5% Germans and 0.1% are of other or undeclared nationalities.

== History ==
Traces of inhabitance in this place are very old, at the beginning of the 20th century a golden treasure dating from the late Bronze Age was found on its territory.

Grăniceri was first mentioned in documents only in 1438, while Șiclău in 1466.

== Economy ==
Grăniceri is a significant railway frontier crossing point.

== Tourism ==
Situated on a plateau the commune is not abundant in spectacular sights. The church called "Sfinții Arhangheli Mihail și Gavril" built in 1758 and the fishponds are the main local tourist attractions.
