= Abdullatif Al Fozan Award =

The Abdullatif Al Fozan Award for Mosque Architecture is an award established in 2011 that is awarded to designers and architects. It is awarded every three years. The winners are judged by a panel of international jurors who are experienced in the architecture of mosques. It was founded by Saikh Abdullatif Al Fozan.

== Recipients ==
2022,
Year	Theme	Amount nominated	Short Listed	Winners
2022	Mosque Architecture in the 21st Century	201	Argun Mosque - Arqun City, Chechnya; Imam Reza Complex Mosque - Tehran, Iran; Great Mosque of Central Java - Semarang, Indonesia; Minor Mosque - Tashkent, Uzbekistan; King Hussein Mosque - Amman, Jordan; The Flower of God Mosque - Astana, Kazakhstan; Grand Mosque of West Sumatra - Padang, Indonesia; Vali-e-Asr Mosque - Tehran, Iran; Tosyali Oran Mosque - Oran, Algeria; Al-Irsyad Mosque - Central Java, Indonesia; Al Safar Mosque - Padalarang, Indonesia; Chandgaon Mosque - Chittagong, Bangladesh; Baitus Shobur Mosque - Lampung, Indonesia; Mohor Para Mosque - Narsingdi District, Bangladesh; Sancaklar Mosque - Büyükçekmece, Turkey; The Red Mosque - Keraniganj Upazila, Bangladesh; Amir Shakib Arslan Mosque - Moukhtara, Lebanon; Baitur Rauf Mosque - Dhaka, Bangladesh; Concrete Mosque - Halishahar, Bangladesh; King Abdullah Financial District Mosque - Riyadh, Saudi Arabia; Mogan Lake Mosque - Ankara, Turkey; Prayer and Meditation Pavilion - Khartoum, Sudan; Basuna Mosque - Basuna, Egypt; Surau Nusa Idman Mosque - Iskandar Puteri, Malaysia; National Built Heritage Centre community project - Saudi Arabia; Mali Community Mosques Project community project - Mali; Ghana Community Mosques Project community project - Ghana	Grand Mosque of West Sumatra - Padang, Indonesia; Amir Shakib Arslan Mosque - Moukhtara, Lebanon; Sancaklar Mosque - Büyükçekmece, Turkey; Basuna Mosque - Basunah, Egypt; Great Mosque - Djenné, Mali; KAFD Grand Mosque - Riyadh, Saudi Arabia; Red Mosque - Keraniganj Upazila, Bangladesh
