= List of mosques in the Arab League =

This is a list of mosques in the Arab League.

| Name | Images | Country | City | Year | G | Remarks |
|---|---|---|---|---|---|---|
| Djamaa el Kebir | | Algeria | Algiers | 1097 | U | |
| Ketchaoua Mosque | | Algeria | Algiers | 1612 | U | |
| El Jedid Mosque | | Algeria | Algiers | 1880s | U | |
| Great Mosque of Tlemcen | | Algeria | Tlemcen | 1082 | U | |
| Al Fateh Mosque | | Bahrain | Juffair | 1990s | U | |
| Khamis Mosque | | Bahrain | Khamis | ? | U | Believed to be the first mosque in Bahrain. |
| Mosque of Amr ibn al-As | | Egypt | Cairo | 642 | A | |
| Abu Haggag Mosque | | Egypt | Luxor | 11th Century | A | |
| El-Tabia Mosque | | Egypt | Aswan | | A | |
| Mosque of Muhammad Ali | | Egypt | Cairo Citadel | 1848 | T | Most visible site in the city. |
| Mosque-Madrassa of Sultan Hassan | | Egypt | Cairo | 1356 | T | |
| Mosque of Al-Hakim | | Egypt | Cairo | 985 | A | |
| Al-Azhar Mosque | | Egypt | Cairo | 969 | A | National mosque |
| Blue Mosque | | Egypt | Cairo | 1347 | A | |
| Al Hussein Mosque | | Egypt | Cairo | 1154 | T | |
| Mosque of Ibn Tulun | | Egypt | Cairo | 876–879 | U | |
| Abu Haggag Mosque | | Egypt | Luxor | 11th Century | A | |
| El-Mursi Abul Abbas Mosque | | Egypt | Alexandria | ? | U | |
| Al Qa'ed Ibrahim Mosque | | Egypt | Alexandria | ? | U | |
| Imam Husayn Mosque | | Iraq | Karbala | 680 | U | National mosque |
| Al Abbas Mosque | | Iraq | Karbala | 680 | U | National mosque |
| Imam Ali Mosque | | Iraq | Najaf | ? | U | Shrine of Ali |
| Al Kadhimiya Mosque | | Iraq | Kadhimayn | ? | U | Shrine of Twelver Shi'ah 7th and 9th Imam. |
| Al-Askari Mosque | | Iraq | Samarra | ? | U | Mosque with golden dome and shrine of Twelver Shi'ah 10th and 11th Imam. |
| Great Mosque of Samarra | | Iraq | Samarra | 852 | U | |
| King Abdullah I Mosque | | Jordan | Amman | 1989 | U | |
| King Hussein Mosque | | Jordan | Amman | 2006 | U | Praying hall 5,500 worshipers, outdoor praying area 2,500 worshippers, inaugurated on April 11, 2006, Islamic architectural style prevalent in Bilad Sham, Umayyad-style ornamentation carved in Jordanian stone. |
| Chinguetti Mosque | | Mauritania | Chinguetti | ? | U | |
| Grand Mosque | | Kuwait | Kuwait City | 1979–1986 | U | |
| Sayyida Khawla Mosque | | Lebanon | Baalbek | ? | U | |
| Khatem Al-Anbiyaa Mosque | | Lebanon | Beirut | ? | U | |
| Mohammad Al-Amin Mosque | | Lebanon | Beirut | 2005 | U | |
| Fakhredine Mosque | | Lebanon | Deir el Qamar | 1493 | U | |
| Great Mosque of Tripoli | | Lebanon | Tripoli | ? | U | |
| Central Mosque of Nouakchott | | Mauritania | Nouakchott | ? | U | |
| Hassan II Mosque | | Morocco | Casablanca | 1993 | U | Masjid al Malik Hassan II |
| Koutoubia Mosque | | Morocco | Marrakesh | 1158 | U | |
| Sultan Qaboos Grand Mosque | | Oman | Muscat | 2001 | A | |
| Al-Aqsa Mosque Compound / Haram Ash-Sharif | | Israel | Jerusalem (old city) | Unknown, considered the second oldest mosque, | U | Al-Masjid al-Aqṣá, the former Qiblah, site of the significant event of Al-Isra' wal-Mi'raj, third holiest site in Islam. The term properly refers to the whole Temple Mount compound (seen as a single mosque). (Note: According to historian Oleg Grabar, "It is only at a relatively late date that the Muslim holy space in Jerusalem came to be referred to as al-haram al-sharif (literally, the Noble Sacred Precinct or Restricted Enclosure, often translated as the Noble Sanctuary and usually simply referred to as the Haram). While the exact early history of this term is unclear, we know that it only became common in Ottoman times, when administrative order was established over all matters pertaining to the organization of the Muslim faith and the supervision of the holy places, for which the Ottomans took financial and architectural responsibility. Before the Ottomans, the space was usually called al-masjid al-aqsa (the Farthest Mosque), a term now reserved to the covered congregational space on the Haram, or masjid bayt al-maqdis (Mosque of the Holy City) or, even, like Mecca's sanctuary, al-masjid al-ḥarâm,") |
| Mosque of Omar | | Israel | Jerusalem | 1193 | U | |
| Sultan Ibrahim Ibn Adham Mosque | | State of Palestine | Beit Hanina | ? | U | |
| Mosque of Omar | | State of Palestine | Bethlehem | 1860 | U | The mosque was built on the spot where the Rashidun Caliph Umar prayed when he entered Bethlehem and is the oldest mosque in that city. |
| Sayed al-Hashim Mosque | | Gaza Strip | Gaza | 1850 | U | The grandfather of Muhammad is said to be buried under the dome. Originally mosque built in the 12th century. Present day mosque built in 1850. |
| Great Mosque of Gaza | | Gaza Strip | Gaza | 1344 | U | The Great Mosque is the largest and one of the oldest mosques in the Gaza Strip and throughout its history it was Philistine temple, a Byzantine church, an Arab mosque, a Crusader cathedral and was finally transformed back to a mosque by the Mamluks. |
| Ibrahimi Mosque | | State of Palestine | Hebron | ? | U | |
| Al-Khadra Mosque | | State of Palestine | Nablus | 1288–90 | U | |
| King Saud Mosque | | Saudi Arabia | Jeddah | 1987 | SA | |
| Masjid al-Haram | | Saudi Arabia | Mecca | 638, 1571 | U | National mosque |
| Al-Masjid al-Nabawi | | Saudi Arabia | Medina | 1817 | SA | |
| Masjid al-Quba | | Saudi Arabia | Medina | 1986 (rebuilt) | SA | |
| Arba Rucun Mosque | | Somalia | Mogadishu | ? | U | |
| Fakr ad-Din Mosque | | Somalia | Mogadishu | 1269 | U | Oldest mosque in Mogadishu. Built by the Sultanate of Mogadishu's first Sultan, Fakr ad-Din. |
| Mosque of Islamic Solidarity | | Somalia | Mogadishu | 1987 | U | National mosque. Largest masjid in the Horn of Africa. |
| Hajja Soad mosque | | Sudan | Khartoum | ? | U | |
| Great Mosque of Aleppo | | Syria | Aleppo | 715 | U | Shrine of Zechariah, father of John the Baptist |
| Sayyidah Zaynab Mosque | | Syria | Damascus | 682 | U | Shrine of Zaynab bint Ali |
| Sayyidah Ruqayya Mosque | | Syria | Damascus | ? | U | Shrine of Fatimah, the youngest daughter of Husayn ibn Ali |
| Sulaymaniyya Takiyya | | Syria | Damascus | ? | U | |
| Nabi Habeel Mosque | | Syria | Damascus | ? | U | Tomb of Abel, son of Prophet Adam |
| Umayyad Mosque | | Syria | Damascus | 715 | U | National mosque |
| Sinan Pasha Mosque | | Syria | Damascus | 1590 | U | |
| Aqsab Mosque | | Syria | Damascus | 1234 | U | |
| Darwish Pasha Mosque | | Syria | Damascus | 1574 | U | |
| Al-Fadael Mosque | | Syria | Homs | 1062 | U | |
| Al-Nouri Mosque | | Syria | Homs | 1129 | U | |
| Mosquée Ennasr | | Tunisia | Aryanah | ? | U | |
| Bassi Mosque | | Tunisia | Djerba | ? | U | |
| Mosque of Uqba | | Tunisia | Kairouan | 670 | U | also known as the Great Mosque of Kairouan |
| Great Mosque of Mahdia | | Tunisia | Mahdia | ? | U | |
| Great Mosque of Sousse | | Tunisia | Sousse | ? | U | |
| Great Mosque Halfaouine | | Tunisia | Tunis | ? | U | |
| Sheikh Zayed Grand Mosque | | United Arab Emirates | Abu Dhabi | 2000 | A | National mosque |
| Grand Mosque of Dubai | | United Arab Emirates | Dubai | 1998 | A | |
| Mudhaffar Mosque | | Yemen | Taiz | | A | |
| Al-Hadi Mosque | | Yemen | Sa'dah | | A | |
| Al Khair Mosque | | Yemen | Sanaa | | A | |
| Saleh Mosque | | Yemen | Sanaa | 2008 | A | |

Group

| SA | Islamist (Salafism/Wahhabism) |
| TJ | Tablighi Jamaat |
| A | Arab group |
| T | Turkish group |
| U | Unknown group (or undetermineted) |

== See also ==
List of mosques in the United Arab Emirates
