= List of mosques in Egypt =

List of Egyptian mosques

This is a list of mosques in Egypt.

There are 114,000 mosques in Egypt as of 2016, of which 83,000 are affiliated with the Ministry of Endowments. This list includes notable mosques within Egypt; however, it excludes mosques in Alexandria and Cairo, as there are separate lists for mosques in these cities.

== List of mosques ==
=== Elsewhere in Egypt ===
Name	Images	Location	Year	Remarks
Sadat Quraish Mosque		Bilbeis; 30°25′5″N 31°33′48″E	639	Oldest mosque in North Africa
Amr ibn al-As Mosque		Damietta; 31°25′22″N 31°49′05″E	642	The third oldest mosque in Egypt
Ahmad Al-Badawi Mosque		Tanta; 30°47′01″N 30°59′56″E	c. 1276	Renovated in 1975 and in 2005
Ibrahim El Desouki Mosque		Desouk; 31°07′43″N 30°38′47″E	1277	Contains a shrine which entombs the remains of Shaykh al-Islam and mystic Ibrahim al-Dasuqi and his brother Sharaf al-Din Musa
Abu Haggag Mosque		Luxor; 25°42′00″N 32°38′22″E	1286	Founded by As-Salih Ayyub; contains the tomb of Sheikh Yusuf Abu al-Haggag
Mausoleum of Abu al-Hasan al-Shadhili		Humaithara; 24°12′2″N 34°8′8″E	13th century	Originally built as a mausoleum. Preserves the tomb of Abu al-Hasan al-Shadhili, founder of the Shadhili order.
Al-Mahalli Mosque		Rosetta; 31°23′57″N 30°25′18″E	1582	Named in honour of Ali Al-Mahalli, a 15th-century sheikh who lived in Rosetta, who is entombed in the mosque complex.
Zaghloul Mosque		Rosetta; 31°23′56″N 30°25′17″E	1587	The oldest and largest mosque in Rosetta
Sidi Shibl al-Aswad Mosque		Shuhada; 30°35′40″N 30°54′02″E	16th-17th century	Mosque and mausoleum
Al-Abbasi Mosque		Rosetta; 31°23′42″N 30°25′21″E	1809	Named in honour of Sayyid Mohammed Al-Abbasi, whose tomb is located inside the mosque
El-Tabia Mosque		Aswan; 24°05′20″N 32°53′59″E	early-19th century	
Al-Habashi Mosque		Damanhur; 31°2′46″N 30°28′10″E	1923	Named after Mahmoud Pasha Al-Habashi, a noble who lived in Damanhur during the 20th century.
Sidi Arif Mosque		Sohag; 26°32′54″N 31°42′05″E	1968	Replaced a former 14th-century mosque; contains the grave of Sufi mystic Sidi Arif, also known as Ismail ibn Ali ibn Abdussami
El-Tabia Mosque		Aswan; 24°05′20″N 32°53′59″E	1974	
Basuna Mosque		Basuna, Sohag Governorate; 26°40′24″N 31°36′15″E	2019	Replaced an earlier mosque on the site; received the 2021 Al-Fozan Mosque Award for Excellence

== See also ==
- Islam in Egypt
- Lists of mosques
