= Arab Mosque =

Arab Mosque may refer to:

- Arap Mosque or Arab Mosque, a mosque in Istanbul
- Arab Mosque, any of the mosques in the Arab League

== See also ==
- Arab Ahmet Mosque, a mosque in Northern Cyprus
- List of mosques
