= Al-Abbasi Mosque, Rosetta =

Mosque in Rosetta, Egypt

Al-Abbasi Mosque
- المسجد العباسي
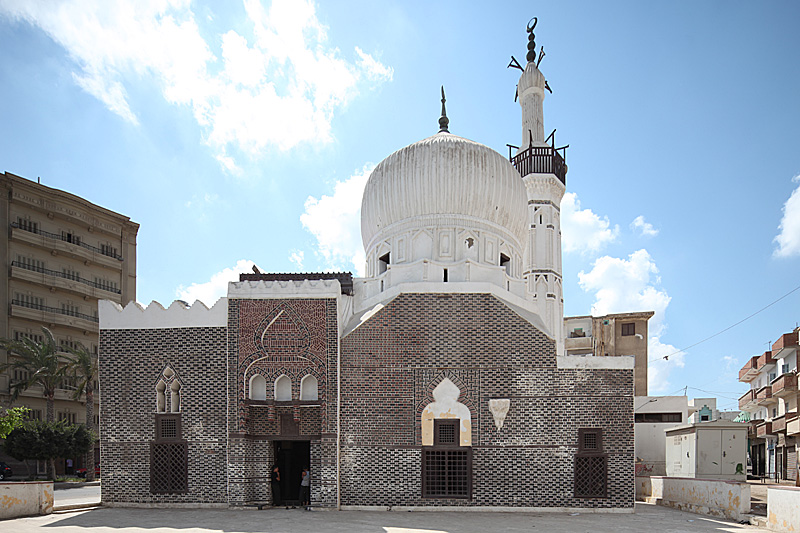

- Location of the mosque in the Nile Delta

Religion
- Affiliation: Sunni Islam
- Ecclesiastical or organisational status: Mosque and mausoleum
- Status: Active

Location
- Location: Rosetta, Beheira Governorate
- Country: Egypt
- Interactive map of Al-Abbasi Mosque
- Coordinates: 31°23′42″N 30°25′21″E

Architecture
- Type: Mosque
- Style: Islamic
- Founder: Mohamed Bey Tbozadh
- Completed: 1809

Specifications
- Dome: 1
- Minaret: 1
- Materials: Rashidi brick; marble; stucco; Qashani tiles

Al-Abbasi Mosque (Arabic: المسجد العباسي, romanized: ālmsǧd ālʿbāsy is a mosque and mausoleum located in Rosetta, in the Beheira Governorate of Egypt, that lies near the banks of the Nile. The mosque is named after Sayyid Mohammed Al-Abbasi, whose tomb is located inside the mosque.

== History ==
The mosque was built in 1809 by Mohamed Bey Tbozadh, and was registered as an Islamic monument by the Egyptian government in 1951. The mosque was restored on several occasions, the latest of which was in 2009 when the government approved E£60,000,000 to restore the old mosques of Rosetta to their original state.

== Architecture ==
The eastern façade of the mosque was built with carved Rashidi brick, a small traditional brick used in old mosques and houses in the city. The main entrance slightly projects from the mausoleum wall, as it features a triple brick arch with three arched openings. Above the entrance is an inscription naming the founder, and above that, a clerestory with Kufic script reading “Muhammad is the Messenger of Allah.” The interior has three aisles that are divided by two arcades on marble columns, with a carved wooden ceiling. The mihrab is a semicircular niche topped with a pointed arch that is supported by two marble columns, and decorated with brick and stucco patterns. The minaret is octagonal, with one level, ending in a cylindrical shaft and helmet-shaped top, similar to other Rosetta minarets.

The tomb of Mohammed Al-Abbasi lies in the northeast corner, under a ribbed dome supported by lobed squinches, and decorated with Qashani tiles and brick patterns.

== See also ==
- Islam in Egypt
- List of mosques in Egypt
