= Sadat Quraish Mosque =

Mosque in Bilbeis, Egypt

- مسجد سادات قريش
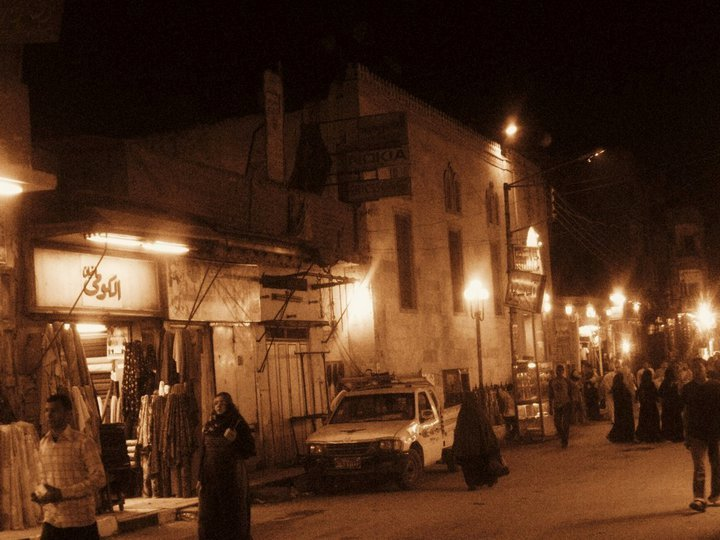

- Location of the mosque in the Nile Delta

Religion
- Affiliation: Islam
- Ecclesiastical or organizational status: Mosque
- Status: Active

Location
- Location: Bilbeis, Sharqia Governorate
- Country: Egypt
- Interactive map of Sadat Quraish Mosque
- Coordinates: 30°25′06″N 31°33′48″E

Architecture
- Type: Mosque
- Style: Islamic
- Completed: 18 AH (639/640 CE)
- Minaret: 1

The Sadat Quraish Mosque (Arabic: مسجد سادات قريش) is a mosque located in the city of Bilbeis, in the Sharqia Governorate of Egypt. Some historians believe it was the first mosque in Egypt and that it was founded by Amr ibn al-As in 18 AH (639/640 CE).

== Naming ==
It was named Sadat Quraish or the Lords of the Quraysh tribe in honor of the Muslim martyrs of the Companions of the Islamic prophet Muhammad in their battle against the Romans in Belbis, where about 120 Companions were fighting of which 20-40 were martyred and buried within or around the mosque.

== History ==
Some historians have claimed that the mosque was founded during the Islamic conquest of Egypt by Amr ibn al-As on 15 Muharram 18 AH (16 January 640 CE). This would make it slightly older than the Amr ibn al-As Mosque in Fustat (modern Cairo), which is more commonly accepted as the first mosque in Egypt.

After the Battle of Karbala, Sayyidah Zaynab, the daughter of Ali, is said to have received a vision in Medina that the Messenger of God ordered them to take the Ahl al-Bayt (family of the Islamic prophet Muhammad) to Egypt. They were welcomed by the people of Bilbeis and stayed in the mosque for a month.

The Abbasid caliph Al-Ma'mun stayed in it for 40 days when he went down to Egypt to re-establish order, after Bashmurian revolts against the Abbasid governor Isa ibn Mansur. The caliph ordered the restoration of the mosque and, as a result, it was known as the Al-Ma'mun Mosque for a period of time.

The Sadat Quraish mosque is registered among the Islamic antiquities in the Ministerial Decree No. 10357 of the year 1951. It has been encroached upon by later buildings around it. The minaret is missing its top, as it was dismantled in the 1970s due to fears of collapse.

== Architecture ==
The rectangular mosque contains 18 marble columns in three rows and is divided into four arches parallel to the qibla walls, and the crowns of the columns are of different shapes denoting their origin from different Ancient Egyptian and Roman temples, and the area of the mosque is approximately 3,000 square metres (32,000 sq ft). The mosque was renovated in the Ottoman era by the Emir of Egypt, Al-Kashif, who built the minaret.

== See also ==
- Islam in Egypt
- List of mosques in Egypt
