= Al-Mahalli Mosque =

Mosque in Rosetta, Egypt

- المسجد المحلي
- Location of the mosque in the Nile Delta

Religion
- Affiliation: Islam
- Ecclesiastical or organizational status: Mosque and mausoleum
- Status: Active

Location
- Location: Rosetta, Beheira Governorate
- Country: Egypt
- Interactive map of Al-Mahalli Mosque
- Coordinates: 31°23′57″N 30°25′18″E

Architecture
- Type: Mosque
- Completed: 1582

Specifications
- Minaret: 1
- Minaret height: 19 m (62 ft)
- Shrine: 1: (Al-Mahali)

Al-Mahalli Mosque (Arabic: المسجد المحلي, romanized: Masjid Al-Mahalli) is a mosque and mausoleum in Rosetta, in the Beheira Governorate of Egypt. The mosque is named in honour of Ali Al-Mahalli, a 15th-century sheikh who lived in Rosetta, who is entombed in the mosque complex.

== History ==
The mosque was constructed in 1582 on the tomb of Sheikh Al-Mahali, who was buried in 1495. The mosque has been restored on several occasions, earliest of which was in 1722 by the waqf; and the most notable restoration was by Ali Bek Tabak, the mayor of Rosetta, during the second half of the 19th century, when he extended the mosque's size by buying two Wikala's north of the mosque and making them part of the mosque. In 2019, the mosque was restored again, organized by the Egyptian government, that repaired several cracks in the mosque walls, as well as fixing the sewerage system as part of a plan to make Rosetta more attractractive to tourists and to create an open-air Islamic museum.

== Architecture ==
The mosque's 23,000-metre-long (75,000 ft) irregular layout comprises a central sahn surrounded by arcades, supported by exactly 99 columns holding up the ceiling. The mosque contains six entrances, each one crowned with a triple arch and different decorations, and also contains a library. The western segment of the mosque contains a wudu and has a 14-column portico. In the mosque's centre the tomb of Al-Mahali is located, surrounded by a maqsura. The mosque's minaret is 19 metres (62 ft) tall.

== See also ==
- Islam in Egypt
- List of mosques in Egypt
