= Al-Habashi Mosque =

Mosque in Damanhur, Egypt

- المسجد الحبشي
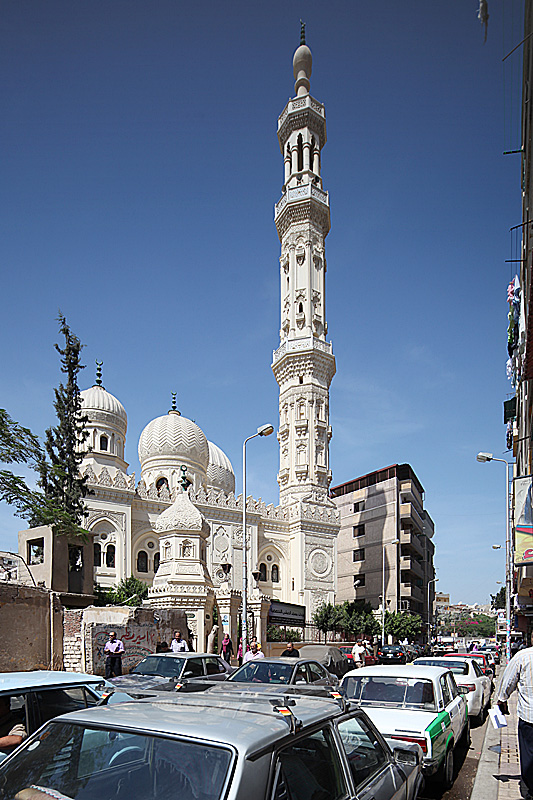

- Location of the mosque in the Nile Delta

Religion
- Affiliation: Islam
- Ecclesiastical or organizational status: Mosque
- Status: Active

Location
- Location: Damanhur, Beheira Governorate
- Country: Egypt
- Interactive map of Al-Habashi Mosque
- Coordinates: 31°2′46″N 30°28′10″E

Architecture
- Type: Mosque
- Style: Ottoman; Mamluk
- Completed: 1923

Specifications
- Dome: Many
- Minaret: 1 (maybe more)

Al-Habashi Mosque (Arabic: المسجد الحبشي, romanized: Masjid Al-Habashi) is a mosque in Damanhur, in the Beheira Governorate of Egypt. It is named after Mahmoud Pasha Al-Habashi, a noble who lived in Damanhur during the 20th century.

== History ==
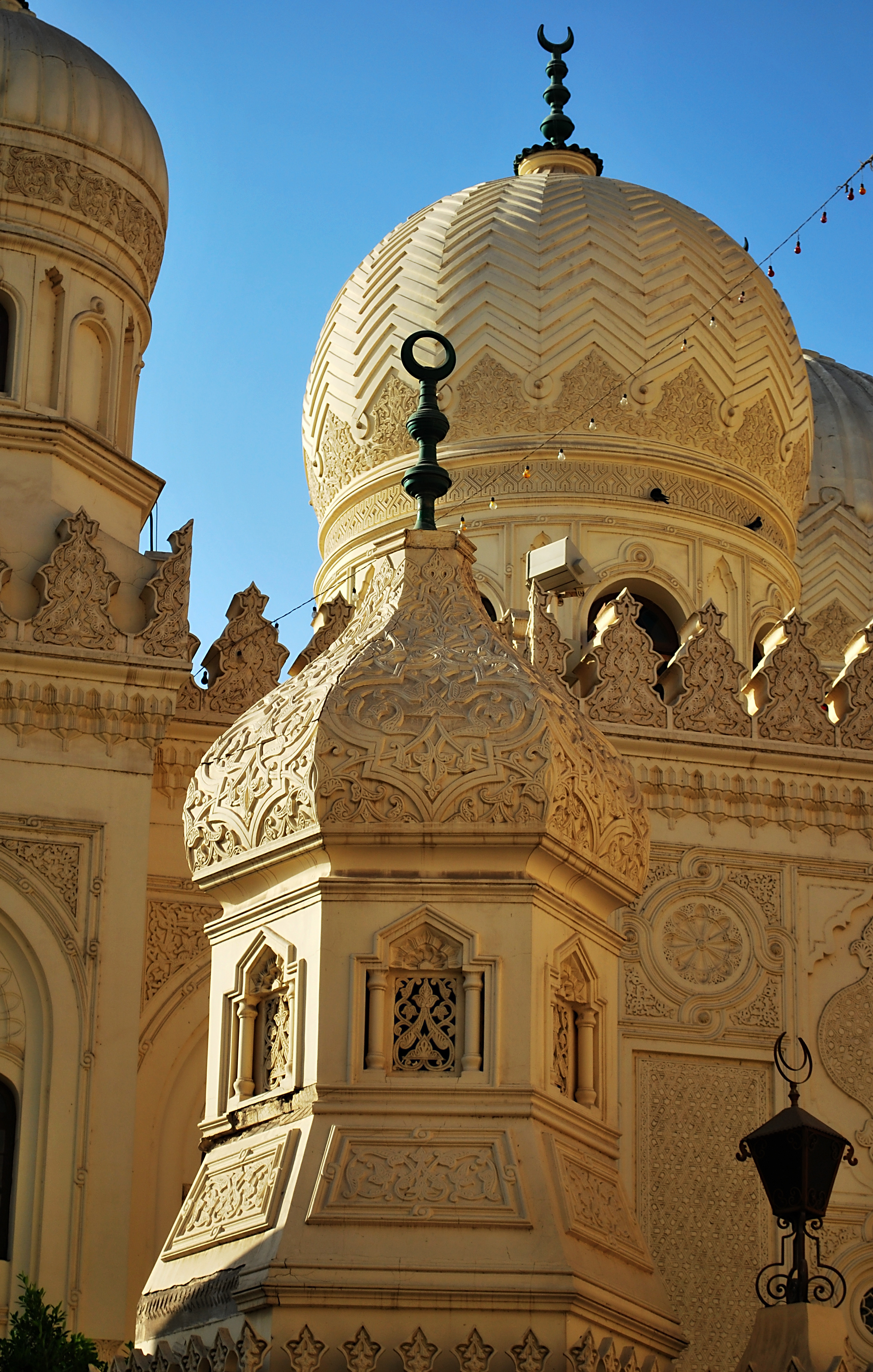
Detail of one of the many domes, in 2010

The mosque was built by Hussein, the son of Mahmoud Pasha, as a fulfillment of the will Mahmoud Pasha left to his son, which requested him to build a mosque. In 1920, while on a trip visiting the city, Sultan Fuad I ceremonially laid the founding stone of the mosque. The mosque was completed in 1923, and Hussein was buried in the mosque after his death. In 2021, the Ministry of Awqaf allocated 600,000 EGP for the renovation of the mosque.

== Architecture ==
The mosque's architecture combines all the arts of Mamluk design, especially due to its usage of many domes as well as its usage of plaster white for the exterior. The mosque is surrounded by a wall with two gates leading to its garden, and to the left of the first gate stands a water fountain in the shape of an octagon. Each side of the octagon has a water tap, and above each tap are decorative plant motifs.

== See also ==
- Islam in Egypt
- List of mosques in Egypt
