= Zaghloul Mosque =

Mosque in Rosetta, Egypt

Mosque of Zaghloul
- مسجد زغلول
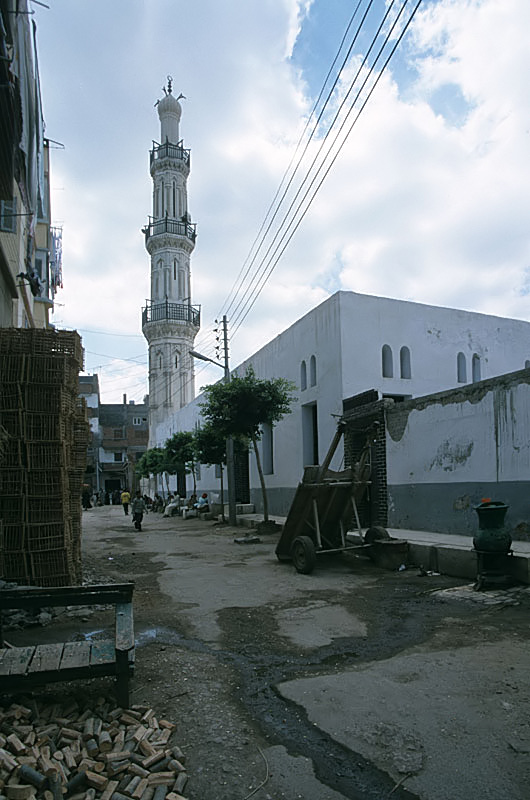

- Location of the mosque in the Nile Delta

Religion
- Affiliation: Sunni Islam
- Ecclesiastical or organizational status: Mosque
- Status: Active

Location
- Location: Rosetta, Beheira Governorate
- Country: Egypt
- Interactive map of Mosque of Zaghloul
- Coordinates: 31°23′56″N 30°25′17″E

Architecture
- Type: Mosque
- Style: Mamluk; Ottoman
- Completed: 1587

Specifications
- Dome: Many
- Minaret: 1
- Site area: 5,300 m^{2} (57,000 sq ft)

The Mosque of Zaghloul (Arabic: مسجد زغلول, romanized: masjid zaghlūl), also known as the Zaghloul Mosque, is a mosque in Rosetta, in the Beheira Governorate of Egypt. It is named after its founder, a Mamluk named Zaghloul, who is buried inside. It is the oldest mosque in Rosetta, as well as its largest.

== History ==
The mosque was built in 1587 by Zaghloul, a Mamluk who was owned by a prince named Sayyid Harun. Like many mosques at the time, it was a center of science, religion, and national movements, which made it influence the events of the city during this period. The mosque was catalyst for popular resistance against the French campaign in Egypt in 1801, and also had an important role in the battle of Rashid during the Alexandria expedition of 1807. As the British army invaded Rosetta from Alexandria, the 700-man garrison in Rosetta awaited a signal to attack the incoming British soldiers, when the muezzin (the caller to prayer), under the orders of the governor of Rosetta Ali Bey Al-Selaniki and Sheikh Hassan Crete, chanted from the minaret of the mosque: 'Allah Akbar! (God is great) For jihad!', which alerted the garrison that now was the time to strike. Rashid's garrison fire broke out from all over the city, and the battle ended with the British defeated.

The mosque has been renovated several times, the latest of which was in 2015.

== Architecture ==
The mosque is approximately 5,300 square metres (57,000 sq ft), and is divided into two sections which are separated by a brick wall: the western section, which contains an open-air courtyard and marble columns, and the eastern section. The mosque is adorned with two mihrabs: one in the eastern section, semi-circular and decorated with carved brick, and the other in the western section, featuring a pointed arch. Additionally, there is a wooden minbar. The mosque measures 90 metres (300 ft) long and 48 metres (157 ft) wide. It contains 99 columns made of marble, and displays a vast number of small domes in the Ottoman style.

== See also ==
- Islam in Egypt
- List of mosques in Egypt
