= Sidi Shibl al-Aswad Mosque =

Mosque in Shuhada, Egypt

- مسجد سيدي شبل الأسود
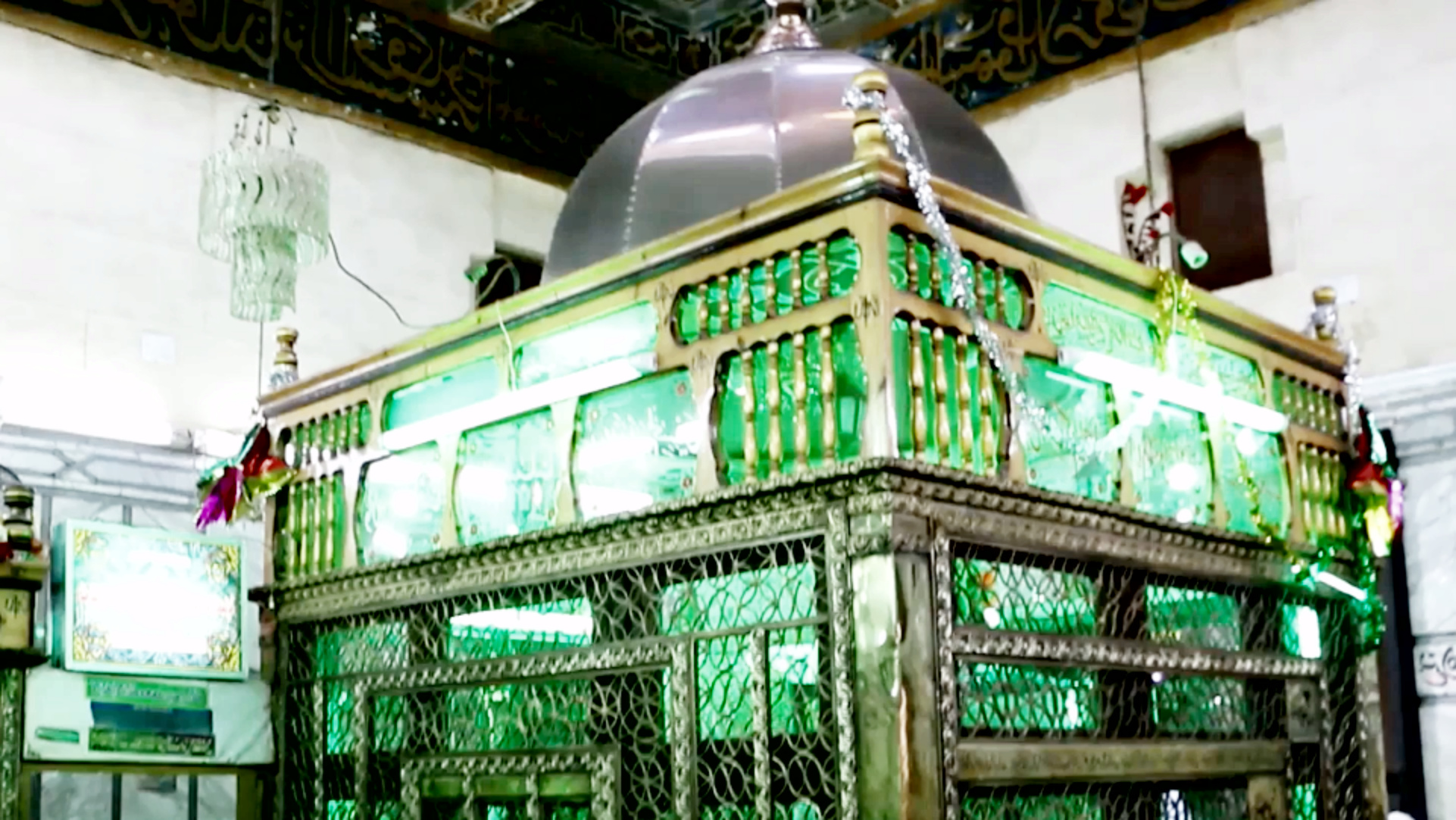
- Mausoleum of Sidi Shibl inside the mosque

- Location of the mosque in the Nile Delta

Religion
- Affiliation: Islam
- Ecclesiastical or organizational status: Mosque and mausoleum
- Status: Active

Location
- Location: Shuhada, Monufia Governorate
- Country: Egypt
- Interactive map of Sidi Shibl al-Aswad Mosque
- Coordinates: 30°35′40″N 30°54′02″E

Architecture
- Type: Mosque
- Style: Neo-Mamluk
- Completed: 16th–17th century (historic); 1925–1927 (current)

Specifications
- Dome: 1
- Minaret: 2

The Sidi Shibl al-Aswad Mosque (Arabic: مسجد سيدي شبل الأسود) is a mosque and mausoleum, located in the city of Shuhada in the Monufia Governorate of Egypt. The mosque is named for Muhammad ibn al-Fadl, a Tabi' who is known by the locals as Sidi Shibl. Every year, there are celebrations of the Mawlid of Sidi Shibl at the mosque to commemorate his martyrdom at the hands of the Byzantines.

== History ==
The mosque was constructed between the late 16th to early 17th centuries CE over the mausoleum and shrine of Sidi Shibl, whose real name was Muhammad ibn al-Fadl, the grandson of al-Abbas ibn 'Abd al-Muttalib. The historicity of the burial has been questioned, as the Mamluk-era Muslim scholar Ibn Hajar al-Asqalani narrated that al-Fadl ibn al-Abbas did not have any sons and left only one daughter. Ibn 'Abd al-Barr also denied that al-Abbas had a grandson named Muhammad from al-Fadl. Regardless, the mausoleum was reportedly held sacred by the locals in 1510, before the construction of the mosque. At least one source states that the mosque was built by the Fatimids.

The mosque was rebuilt by the governor of Monufia, a certain Hassan Bey, in 1846. However, the present-day structure is a 1925 reconstruction. The reopening celebration of the mosque in 1927 was attended by the king of Egypt at the time, Fu'ad I. The most recent renovation of the mosque is from the 2020s. It reopened in 2023 after extensive renovations.

== Architectural features ==
The mosque layout consists of two squares, one of which includes the open courtyard of the mosque. The other square contains the main mosque building, in which the qibla wall and indicator is located. Behind the qibla is an entrance portal leading into the mausoleum of Sidi Shibl. The mosque has two large minarets, built in the style of Neo-Mamluk architecture. Only one dome is present to this day, however in the past there were a few other domes that covered the tombs of the other saints buried within the mosque's structure.

=== Mausoleums ===
Aside from Sidi Shibl's mausoleum, a room in the mosque contains the tombs of seven female saints, known as the Sab'a Banat, believed to be Sidi Shibl's relatives. Two Muslim scholars, Sayyid Ahmad al-Misri and Sayyid 'Abd Allah al-Wazir al-Khalifa, are buried in a room next to Sidi Shibl's mausoleum. At least forty other Sahaba martyred in battles against the Byzantines are reportedly buried within the mosque's grounds as well.

== Importance ==
Every December, there is a Mawlid procession to the tomb of Sidi Shibl al-Aswad in commemoration of him and several other martyrs who died fighting against the Byzantine occupation of Egypt. Another celebration also occurs in March. However, the biggest of these celebrations occur in the second half of September.

Local legend also relates that, when a drug dealer hid inside the shrine on escape from the police, he begged mercy and protection from the entombed saint. The saint agreed to grant him protection and when the police entered the shrine, they stripped the dealer of all his possessions, but out of nowhere a large group of snakes appeared, making them leave the man alone.

== See also ==
- Islam in Egypt
- List of mosques in Egypt
