= El Jedid Mosque =

Mosque in Tunis, Tunisia

- الجامع الجديد
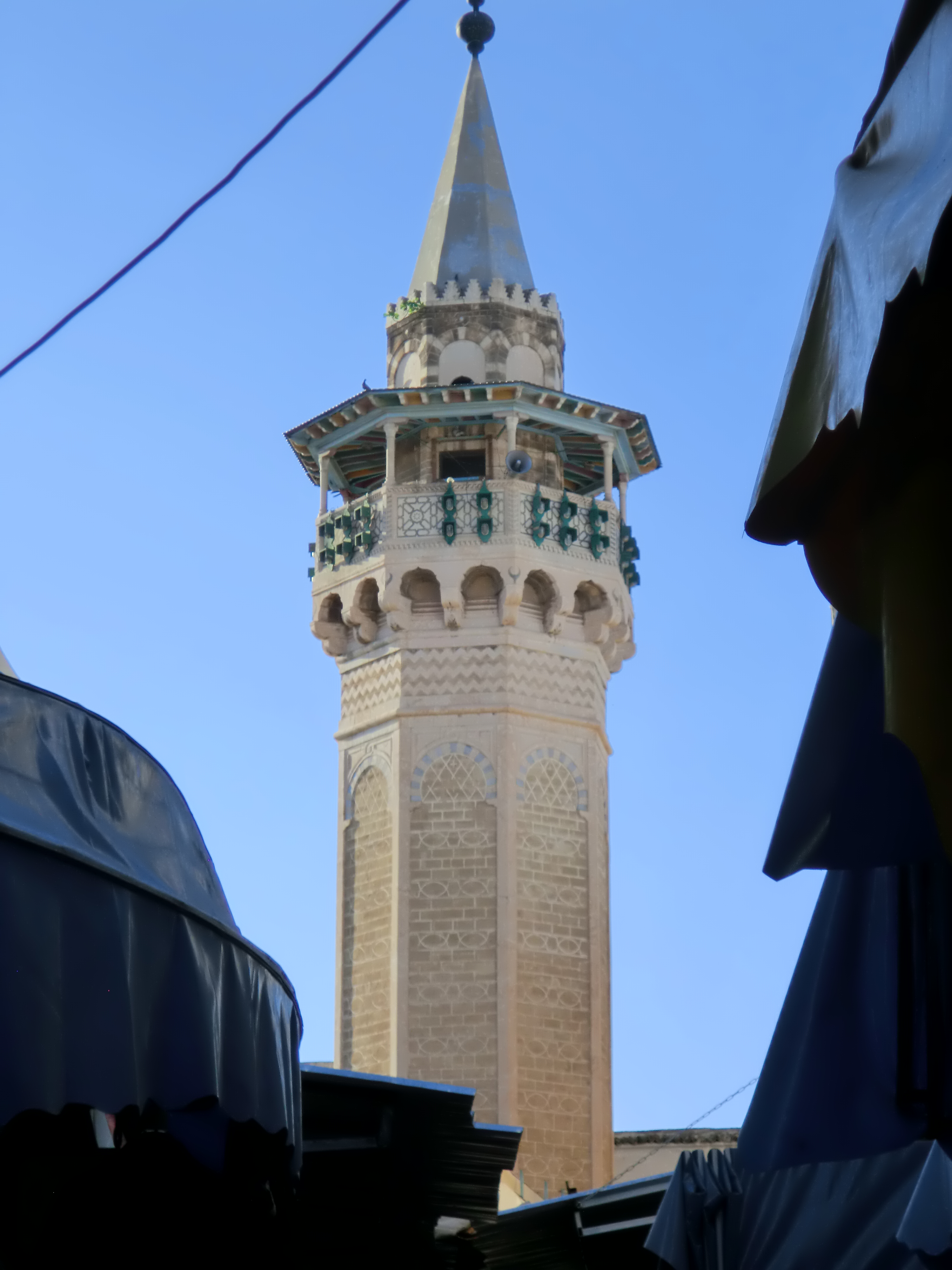

- Tunisia

Religion
- Affiliation: Islam
- Branch/tradition: Sunni

Location
- Location: Tunis, Tunisia
- Coordinates: 36.7948°N 10.1738°E

Architecture
- Type: mosque
- Completed: 1726

El Jedid Mosque (Arabic: الجامع الجديد) is a mosque in Tunis, Tunisia, located in the Medina area of the city.

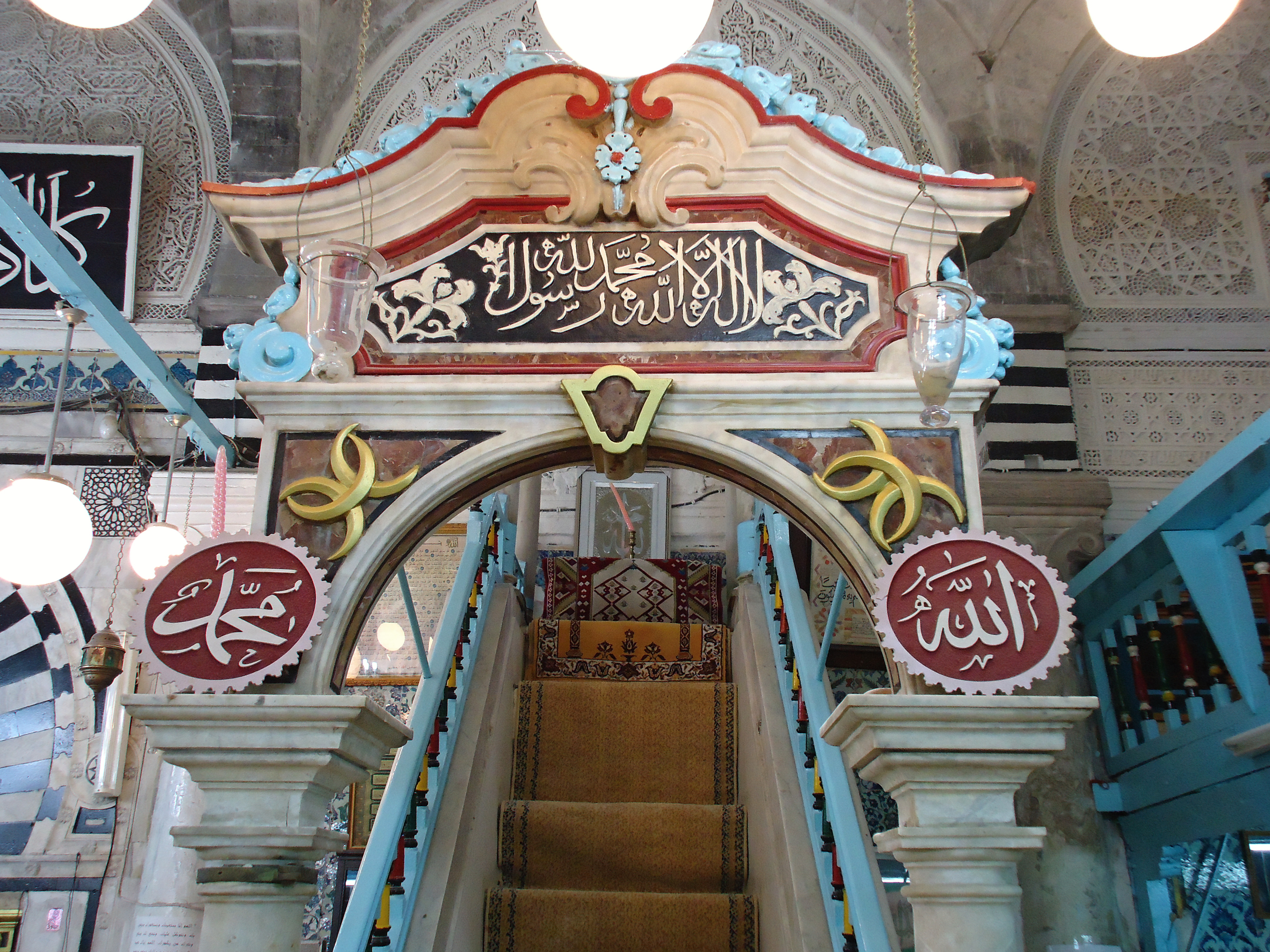
Minbar of the mosque

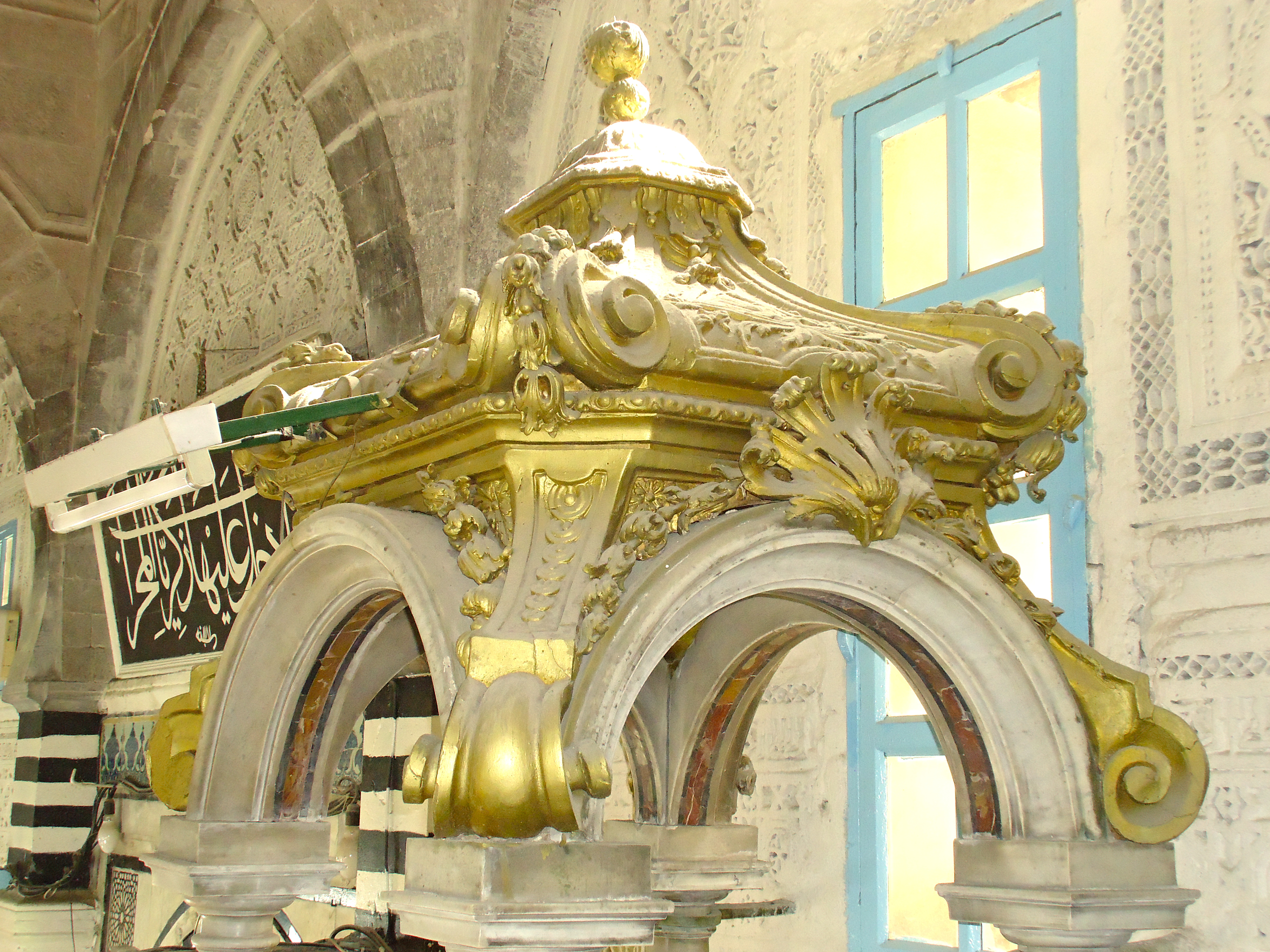
Decoration of the minbar

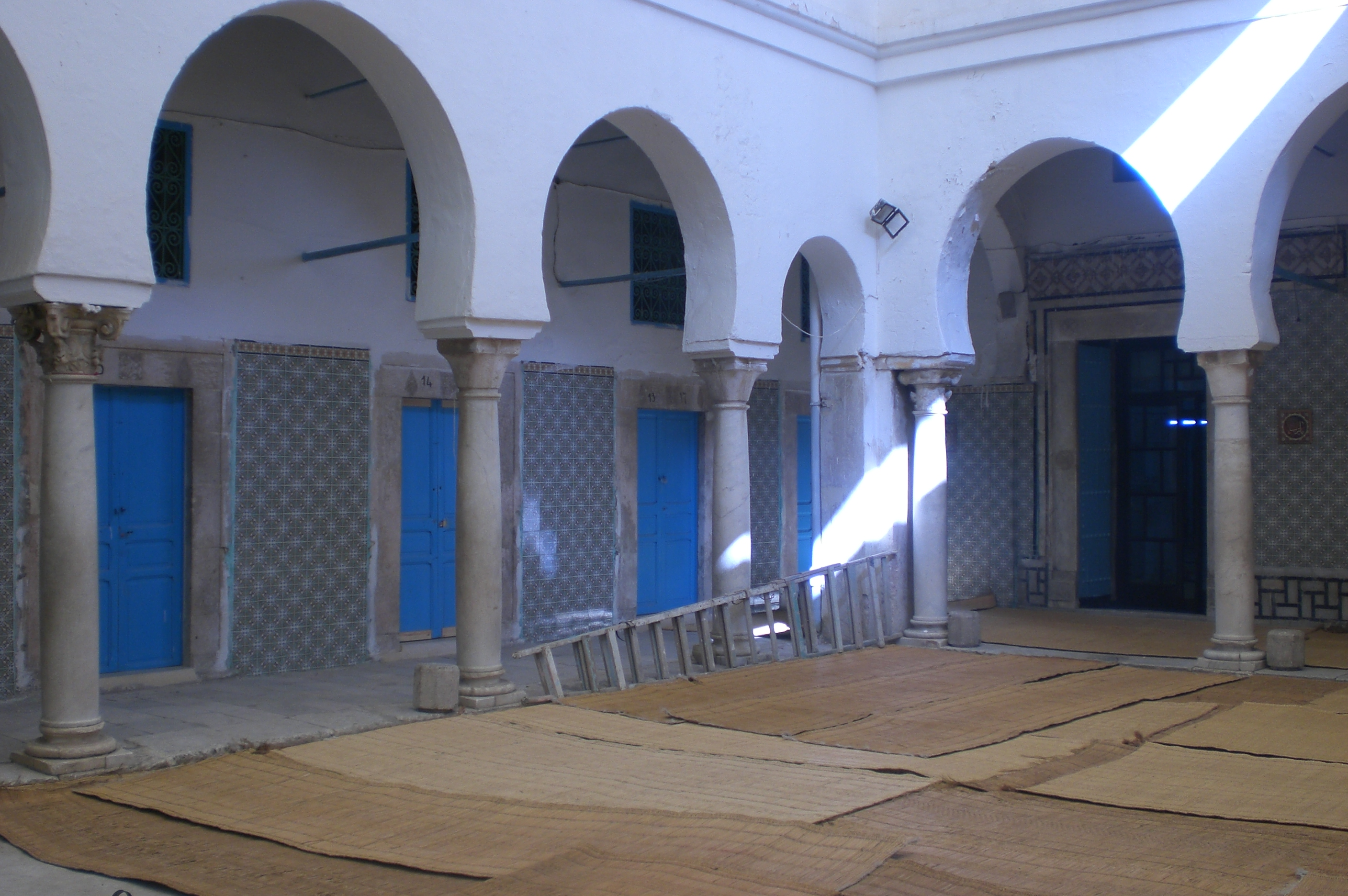
Portico of the medresa near the mosque
