= Shuhada, Egypt =

Shuhada الشهداء
- City
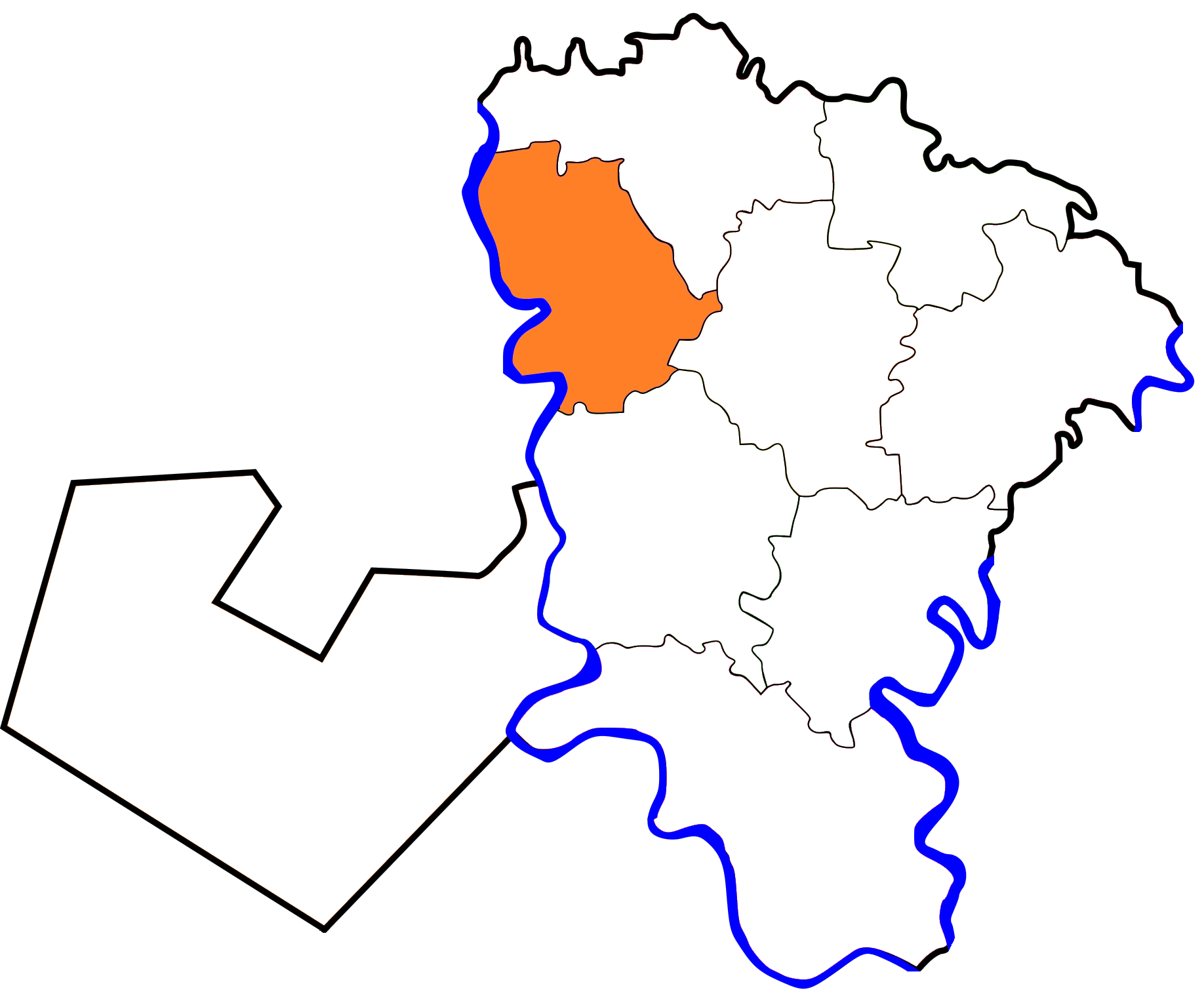
- Location in Monufia Governorate

- Location in Egypt Shuhada (Egypt)
- Coordinates: 30.603935°N 30.902109°E
- Country: Egypt
- Governorate: Monufia

Area
  - Total: 158 km^{2} (61 sq mi)

Population (2019 (estimated))
  - Total: 358,486
  - Density: 2,270/km^{2} (5,880/sq mi)
- Time zone: UTC+2 (EET)
  - Summer (DST): UTC+3 (EEST)

Historical population
Year	Pop.	±%
1996	219,494	—
2006	253,881	+15.7%
2019	358,486	+41.2%
Source: Citypopulation.de

Shuhada (Arabic: الشهداء) is a city and corresponding markaz in Monufia Governorate, Egypt. As of 2019, its estimated population is 358,486, with 72,895 people living in urban areas and 285,591 living in rural areas.

== Name and history ==
The name "al-shuhada" means "the martyrs", referring to the presence of the shrines of martyrs of the Islamic conquest of Egypt. The most prominent of these is the shrine of Sidi Shibl, said to be the son of the Companion Fadl ibn al-Abbas. Other tombs of martyrs are located in the same complex, including one called "Sidi al-Arba'in", or "the holy forty", as well as the "Sab'a banat", or "seven girls", traditionally held to be Sidi Shibl's seven sisters. Sidi Shibl's shrine is one of the most important pilgrimage destinations in the Nile Delta. It takes place one week before the mawlid of Ahmad al-Badawi in Tanta.

Nothing is known of Shuhada before the end of the Mamluk period. It had emerged as a local religious site by 916 AH (1510-11 CE), when rizaq registers mention it (under the name "Kafr al-Shuhada") as having an oratory and zawiya, with the term "zawiya" in this case presumably being used to refer to the tomb of Sidi Shibl. This is the earliest known veneration of Sidi Shibl's tomb. However, at this early stage, it was only a local religious center. Pilgrims are documented at this point coming from the neighboring village of Salamun, but not from further away. Moreover, contemporary hagiographies of the Tanta mawlid do not mention Shuhada or Sidi Shibl, indicating the local nature of its religious significance.

The growth of Shuhada as a religious center dates to the first half of the 17th century. 17th century Egypt in general saw a booming interest in veneration of Sufi saints through mawlids and hagiographies, and Shuhada's growth as a pilgrimage site largely coincides with that trend. The Sufi saint Ahmad al-Ahmadi al-Misri, better known as al-Suhaymi, played an important role in popularizing the Shuhada mawlid over a larger region. Suhaymi, who died in 1043 AH (1633-34 CE), built a mosque next to the existing shrine and settled there to recite the Qur'an and train disciples. When he died, in accordance with his wishes, he was buried in a tomb next to Sidi Shibl's. A rizqa was assigned to finance Suhaymi's tomb soon after, in 1059 AH (1649 CE), reflecting his influence as a holy man as far away as Cairo.

Shuhada prospered thereafter. As early as 1715, the larger town of Sirsina was called "Sirsina wa al-Shuhada", and by 1844, Shuhada had become a nahiyah (village), rather than the hamlet it had been in earlier periods. In 1846, the mosque was renovated at the behest of a local notable named Hasan Agha Sha'ir; the minister of waqf in Egypt designated it as rabi' II on 10 August 1899.

The 1885 Census of Egypt recorded El-Shuhada as a nahiyah under the district of Menouf in Monufia Governorate; at that time, the population of the town was 2,873 (1,368 men and 1,505 women).

In 1925, the minister of waqf had the mosque renovated again, as well as enlarged. In 1927, the mosque received a full inauguration which was attended by king Fu'ad I. In 1941, Shuhada became the district center (markaz), replacing Sirsina, which by now had become a village suburb of Shuhada.
