= Vali-e-Asr Mosque =

Former Shi'ite mosque in Tehran, Iran

- مسجد وليعصر (عج)
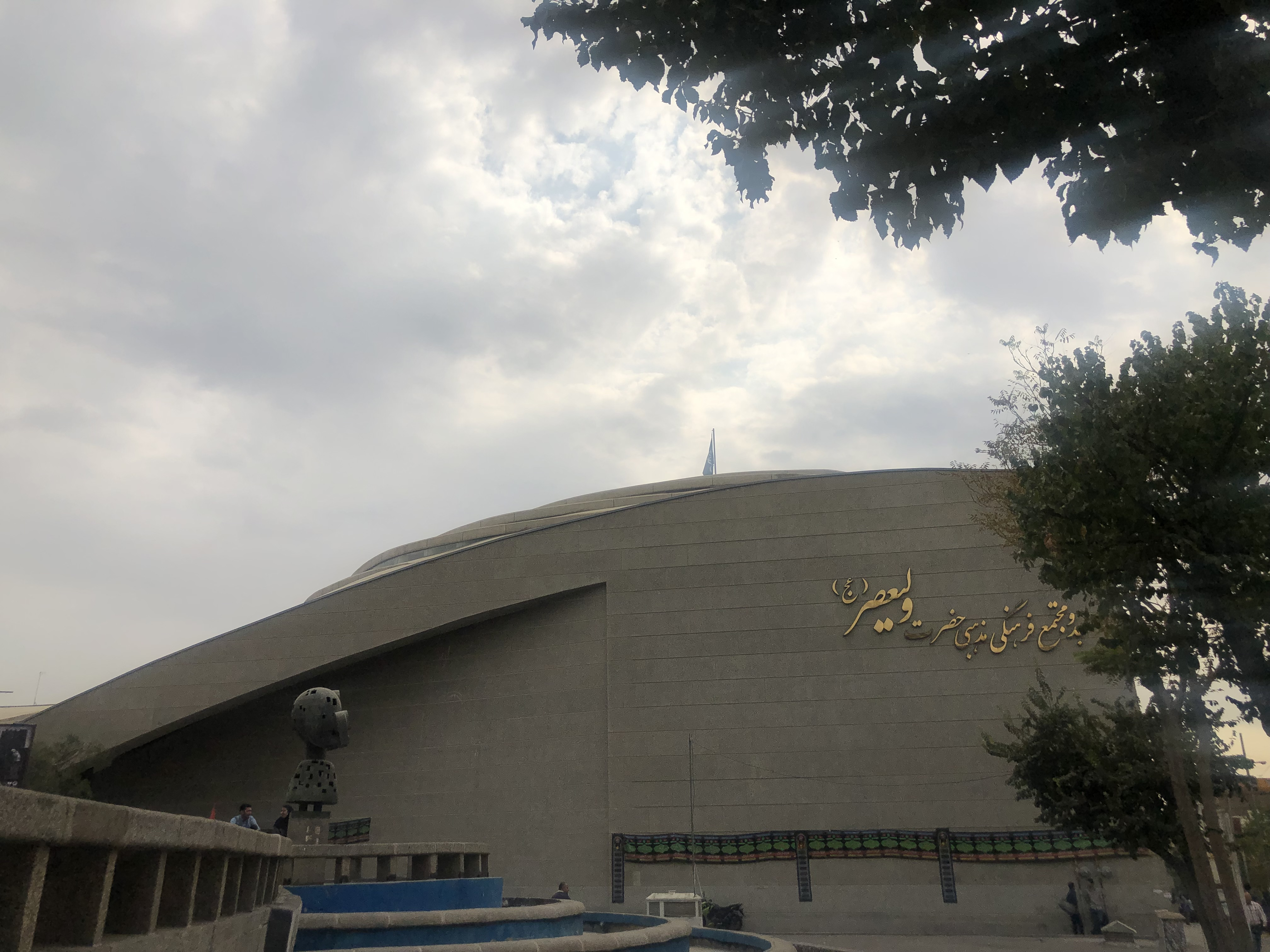
- The mosque in 2019

- Location of the mosque in Tehran

Religion
- Affiliation: Shia Islam (closed)
- Ecclesiastical or organizational status: Mosque
- Status: Inactive

Location
- Location: Tehran, Tehran Province
- Country: Iran
- Interactive map of Vali-e-Asr Mosque
- Coordinates: 35°41′58″N 51°24′20″E

Architecture
- Architects: Fluid Motion Architects: Reza Daneshmir; Catherine Spiridonoff
- Type: Mosque architecture
- Style: Contemporary Iranian; Neomodernism
- Completed: 2018 CE

Specifications
- Interior area: 25,000 m^{2} (270,000 sq ft)
- Site area: 3,855 m^{2} (41,490 sq ft)
- Materials: Concrete; plaster; marble

The Vali-e-Asr Mosque (Persian: مسجد وليعصر (عج)), also spelled as the Valiasr Mosque, is a Shi'ite mosque that has been forcibly closed, located in the city of Tehran, in the province of Tehran, Iran. It takes its name, a reference to the Mahdi in Shi'ite tradition, from the nearby Valiasr Street.

The mosque was designed by the founders of the Iranian architectural and urban design firm Fluid Motion Architects, Reza Daneshmir and Catherine Spiridonoff in an Iranian contemporary neomodernist style. The building spans 3,855 square metres (41,490 sq ft) and contains eight floors, four of which lie underground, providing a floor area of 25,000 square metres (270,000 sq ft). In addition to serving as a place of prayer, the mosque also functions as a cultural center, containing a library and several classrooms. The mosque became a source of controversy in Iran due to its lack of traditional domes and minarets. Consequently, its official religious operations were halted by the Iranian government in 2018.

== History ==
=== Construction ===
The space currently allocated to the mosque was originally bought by Suleiman Manavi and was inherited by his grandson, Davood Manavi, a Baha'i, who owned it at the time of the Iranian Revolution. After the revolution the government expropriated the land due to Manavi's religion, and continued to use it as a parking lot until the early 1980s, when the idea for a mosque in the space was introduced for the first time. A fundraiser was organized to sponsor its construction, but it was unsuccessful. Two decades later, during Mahmoud Ahmadinejad's tenure as mayor of Tehran, the first proposals for the current mosque were made. He hoped a new mosque would assert religious influence in a relatively secular area that included Tehran University and several associated bookshops.

The mosque drew strong opposition from artists and intellectuals, who feared that the proposed 55-metre-tall (180 ft) mosque would overshadow the adjacent City Theater of Tehran and threaten its structural integrity. Many critics preferred to expand the adjacent park due to the mosque's proximity to the theater. After the election of Mohammed Bagher Ghalibaf as mayor of Tehran in 2005 and a sit-in staged by opponents of the mosque, a different approach to its construction was taken. Consequently, Fluid Motion Architects was commissioned to design an alternative version of the mosque. The firm altered the original plan for the mosque in an attempt to attain harmony with its surroundings. To achieve this goal, Fluid Motion's alterations primarily focused on reducing the mosque's height through the elimination of traditional features, such as domes and minarets. The mosque's unconventional design drew opposition from Iranian conservatives, leading to legal battles and limited funding, which resulted in construction delays. In spite of these challenges, the mosque was completed in 2018.

=== End of religious operations ===
During the later stages of its construction and the weeks following its completion, the mosque elicited criticism from many Iranian conservatives because of its lack of traditional features, particularly domes and minarets. They also heavily criticized it due to its relatively small size compared to the City Theater and other mosques. These critics argued that mosques must contain large, dominant features, including domes and minarets, in order to depict the greatness of God. They also believed its postmodern design was devoid of significant meaning. Some critics also questioned the legitimacy of the mosque due to the religious background of Catherine Spiridonoff, whose grandfather was a Christian rather than a Muslim. The debate over the mosque's design culminated in an intervention by the Iranian government. It resolved the controversy by halting religious operations in the mosque and the passing a law which banned the construction of mosques without domes or minarets.

== Architecture ==
The mosque was designed to attain harmony with its cultural surroundings, particularly the adjacent City Theater. Its architects also aimed to create a structure which eschewed extrinsic design elements, such as structural height, which they perceived as superficial requirements. Instead, they sought to emphasize intrinsic elements, such as the simplicity and modesty of Islam. The original form of the Quba Mosque, the first Islamic mosque, was used as a source of inspiration for the implementation of these elements. The architects also desired to create a mosque that appealed to the local population, which primarily consisted of younger generations and intellectuals. Consequently, the architects used the views and values of these demographics to inform certain aspects of the mosque's design, such as its modernity. The mosque's unorthodox design philosophy has contributed to some criticisms of it.

=== Interior ===
The materials used to construct the mosque's interior, white plaster for its ceilings and walls, and cream marble for its floors, were likely chosen due to budget constraints. The interior avoids decoration outside of its mihrab, which is covered in Persian blue tiles. The mihrab is also notable for spanning the full height of the qibla wall, unlike typical mihrabs, which generally do not reach the mosque's ceiling.

=== Exterior ===
Washed concrete was used to construct the mosque's exterior due to its relatively low price and its previous use in the construction of the neighboring City Theater. The exterior's most prominent exterior feature is its sloping roof. One section of the roof was intended to serve as a courtyard that connected the adjacent park and the City Theater to the mosque. However, the roof is inaccessible, preventing it from functioning as a courtyard in practice. The height of the roof corresponds to the height of an adjacent park at one extreme and that of the City Theater's ceiling at the other. The roof also contains openings which serve as skylights, allowing for the passage of both natural light and air to the mosque's lower levels. The design of these openings was inspired by the geometry of intersecting arches in Iranian domes known as karbandi, or squinch-nets. The mosque also contains two entrances, a northern one and a western one. The northern entrance was designed to resemble a tent, and the western entrance contains a slight turn inspired by the entrance of the Sheikh Lotfollah Mosque.

=== Awards ===
Despite its criticism, the building was awarded a range of prizes in several global architectural competitions including winning the Cultural Architecture Award at the 2018 Architecture Master Prize in California and the Community and Cultural Project of the Year Award at the 2018 Middle East Architecture Award in Dubai.

== See also ==
- Shia Islam in Iran
- List of mosques in Iran
