= El-Tabia Mosque =

Mosque in Aswan, Egypt

- مسجد الطابية
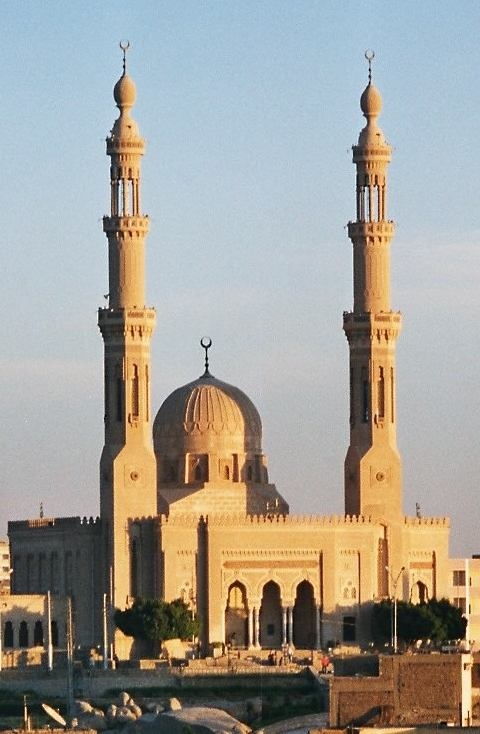

- Location of the mosque in Egypt

Religion
- Affiliation: Islam
- Ecclesiastical or organizational status: Mosque
- Status: Active

Location
- Location: Aswan, Aswan Governorate
- Country: Egypt
- Interactive map of El-Tabia Mosque
- Coordinates: 24°05′20″N 32°53′59″E

Architecture
- Type: Mosque
- Completed: 1974

Specifications
- Dome: 1
- Minaret: 2

El-Tabia Mosque (Arabic: مسجد الطابية) is a mosque located in Aswan, in the Aswan Governorate, in southern Egypt. Completed in 1974 and surrounded by scenic gardens, the mosque is located amidst a park on a hill in the center of Aswan.

Typical of most central-dome mosques, it has atypical architecture with an arched entrance flanked by two minarets, and a prayer hall beneath a central dome.

== See also ==
- List of mosques in Egypt
- Islam in Egypt
