= Basuna Mosque =

Mosque in Sohag, Egypt

- مسجد باصونة
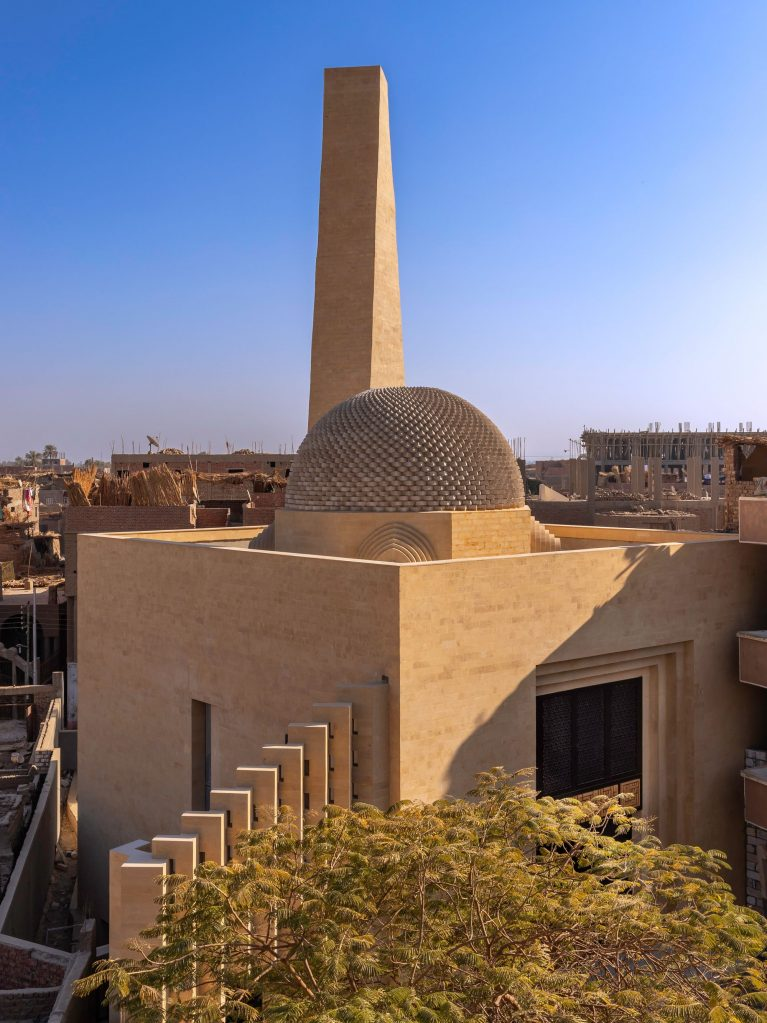

Religion
- Affiliation: Islam
- Ecclesiastical or organisational status: Mosque
- Status: Active

Location
- Location: Basuna, Sohag Governorate
- Country: Egypt
- Interactive map of Basuna Mosque
- Coordinates: 26°40′24″N 31°36′15″E

Architecture
- Architect: Waleed Arafa
- Type: Mosque
- Funded by: Shaykh Osama al-Azhary
- Groundbreaking: 2013
- Completed: 2019

Specifications
- Interior area: 170 m^{2} (1,800 sq ft)
- Dome: 1
- Minaret: 1

The Basuna Mosque, also known as the Abu Stait Mosque (Arabic: مسجد باصونة), is a mosque located in the village of Basuna in the Sohag region of Egypt. It was constructed in 2019 by Egyptian architect Waleed Arafa. The mosque was primarily funded by Shaykh Osama al-Azhary, the Religious Affairs Advisor to al-Sisi, a respected figure in the village, with contributions from the architect as well. The total area of the mosque is 450 m^{2} (4,800 sq ft). Its architecture, which is based on a modern interpretation of Egyptian tradition, was recognized with the Al-Fozan Mosque Award for excellence in 2021.

== History and location ==
For 300 years, the Basuna Mosque was the main mosque in the village of Basuna in Sohag. It was located next to the village cemetery and was the only mosque used for funeral services in the village. Additionally, it was situated in a densely populated urban area with narrow streets. A weekly market in front of the mosque required consideration of the resulting nuisances (noise, dirt, smell, etc.). The land on which it was built belonged to the Abu Stait family, from which the Mosque Abu Stait gets its name.

However, a sudden flood caused significant structural damage that necessitated the demolition of the building to ensure the safety of the neighborhood's residents. Construction of a new mosque began in 2013, and it was inaugurated in 2019.

== Architecture ==
The mosque blends traditional and contemporary elements. It includes the classic components of a mosque: minaret, dome, and mihrab. However, their presentation is innovative.

The architecture aimed to incorporate elements that respond to the mosque's unique situation while creating a space conducive to contemplation and spiritual reflection. Among the matters considered by the architect were the limited budget and space, creating a peaceful sanctuary in the bustling neighbourhood, and the arid and dry climate. Given the limited space, the neighbors contributed to enlarging the mosque's area; and Al Haja Ayat Hasan, whose house is next to the mosque, donated a room to enable the mosque to expand.

=== Exterior ===
==== Entrances ====
The mosque features four entrances, two of which are adapted for individuals with limited mobility.

The southern entrances are reserved for men. A small square precedes the entrance, serving as a buffer zone with the outside. It also contains the area designated for ablutions. It is less monumental than the northern entrance.

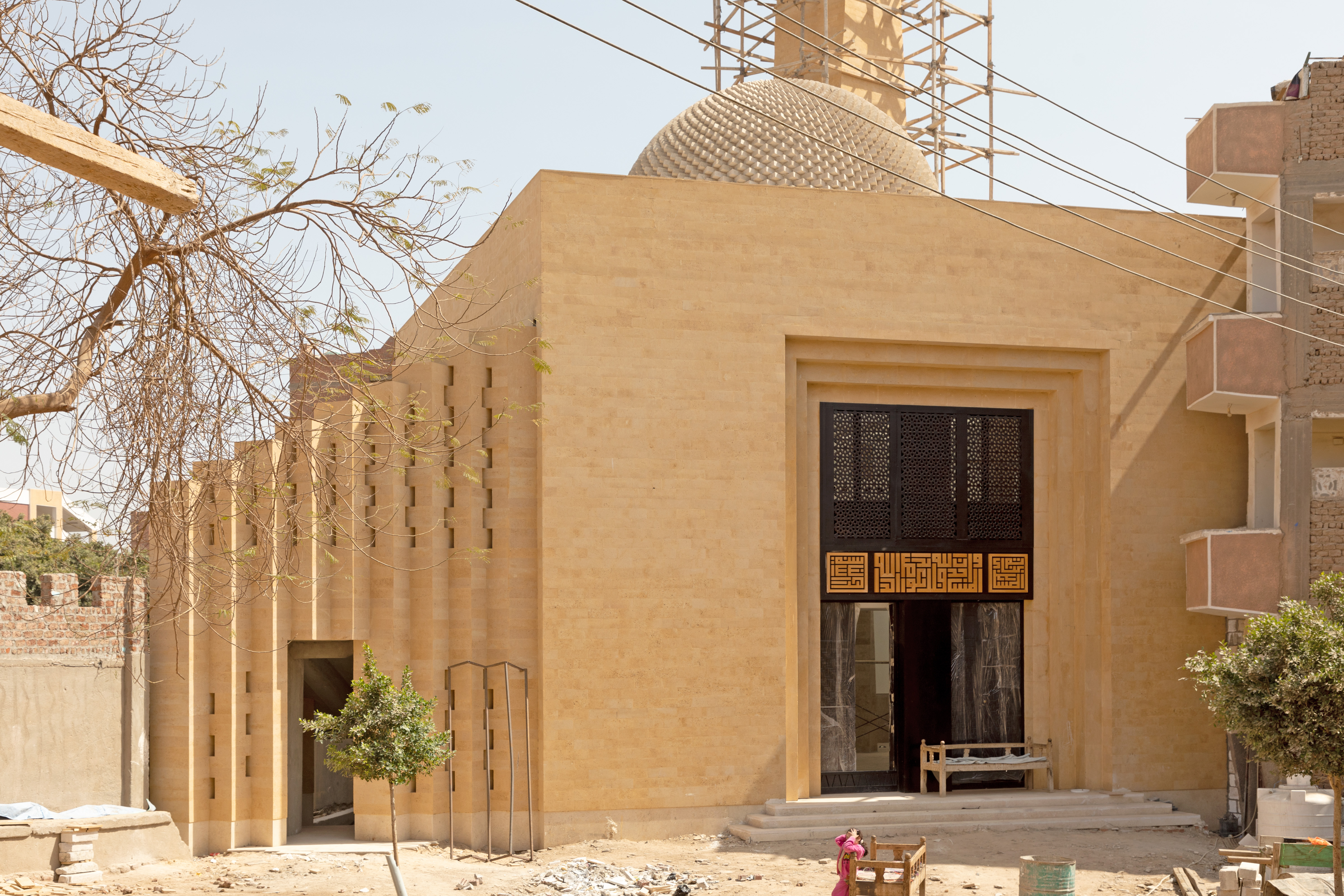
The northern entrance

The northern entrances are primarily used by women or by both men and women of the Abu Stait family. These entrances are preceded by a medium-sized square that hosts events such as weddings. The door leading to the staircase is located on a wall offset from the prayer hall wall. The openings on this wall are reminiscent of mashrabiya. The door leading to the main prayer hall is adorned with a 3.5 metres (11 ft) wooden door, and the only inscription on the exterior is in square Kufic script alongside a mashrabiya.

==== Main dome ====
The main dome was constructed using an Egyptian-made lightweight block called hashma, composed of sand, lime, and air. It is formed from several rows of cubes. The use of artisanal materials is due to the mosque's limited budget and the impracticality of setting up a large construction site given the narrowness of the neighborhood and streets.

==== Minaret ====
The minaret is designed in the shape of a twisted square, echoing the form of the first letter of the Arabic alphabet, Alif, in Thuluth script. This style of calligraphy was invented by the Abbasid vizier Ibn Muqla in the 3rd century of the Hijra. The twist, counterclockwise, mirrors the circumambulation around the Kaaba during the major Muslim pilgrimage and thus embodies the believer's journey from earthly reality to divine truth. However, the top of the minaret has not yet been completed due to financial difficulties.

=== Interior ===
The interior space of the mosque is organized into three levels:

- The basement houses a multipurpose hall and the ablutions facilities.
- The ground level contains the prayer hall and the vestibule.
- The first floor is dedicated to a space reserved for women.

==== Vestibule ====
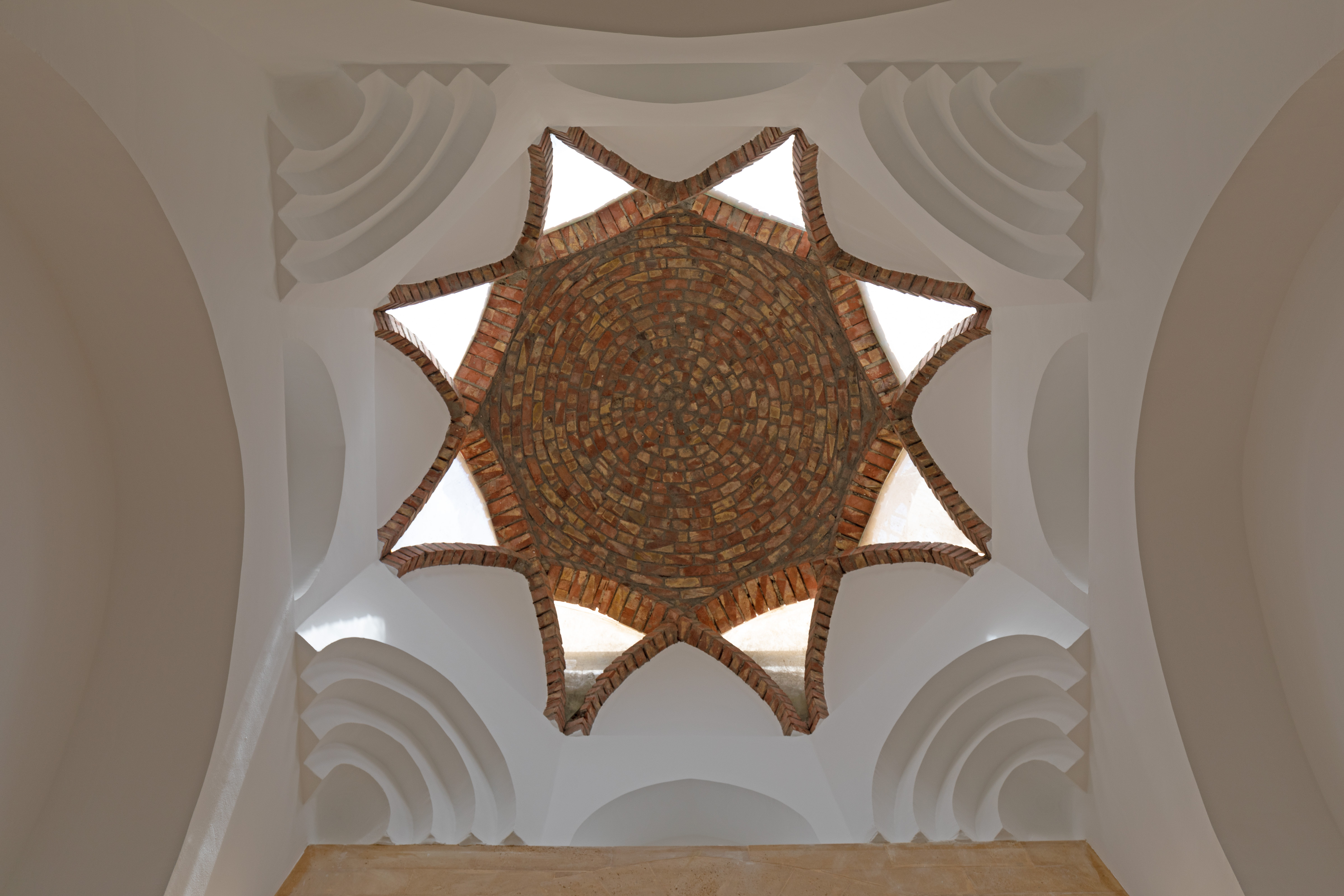
The dome of the vestibule

From the southern entrance, worshippers enter a vestibule before proceeding into the prayer hall. This vestibule is a small room that supports a dome smaller than the central dome. This dome mirrors the form of the mihrab dome in the Great Mosque of Cordoba, featuring an eight-pointed star design. The architect could also have been inspired by the dome over the main entrance of the new campus of the American University in Cairo. The wall of the vestibule is adorned with a geometric glass-based motif that echoes the shape of the mihrab. This indirect entry serves as a transitional space between the tranquility of the mosque and the bustle of the neighborhood.

==== Prayer hall and main dome ====
The prayer hall is rectangular in shape and covers 170 square metres (1,800 sq ft). It features four cream-colored marble columns that echo the shape of the minaret. The walls are decorated in white, and the lower part is finished in cream-colored marble.

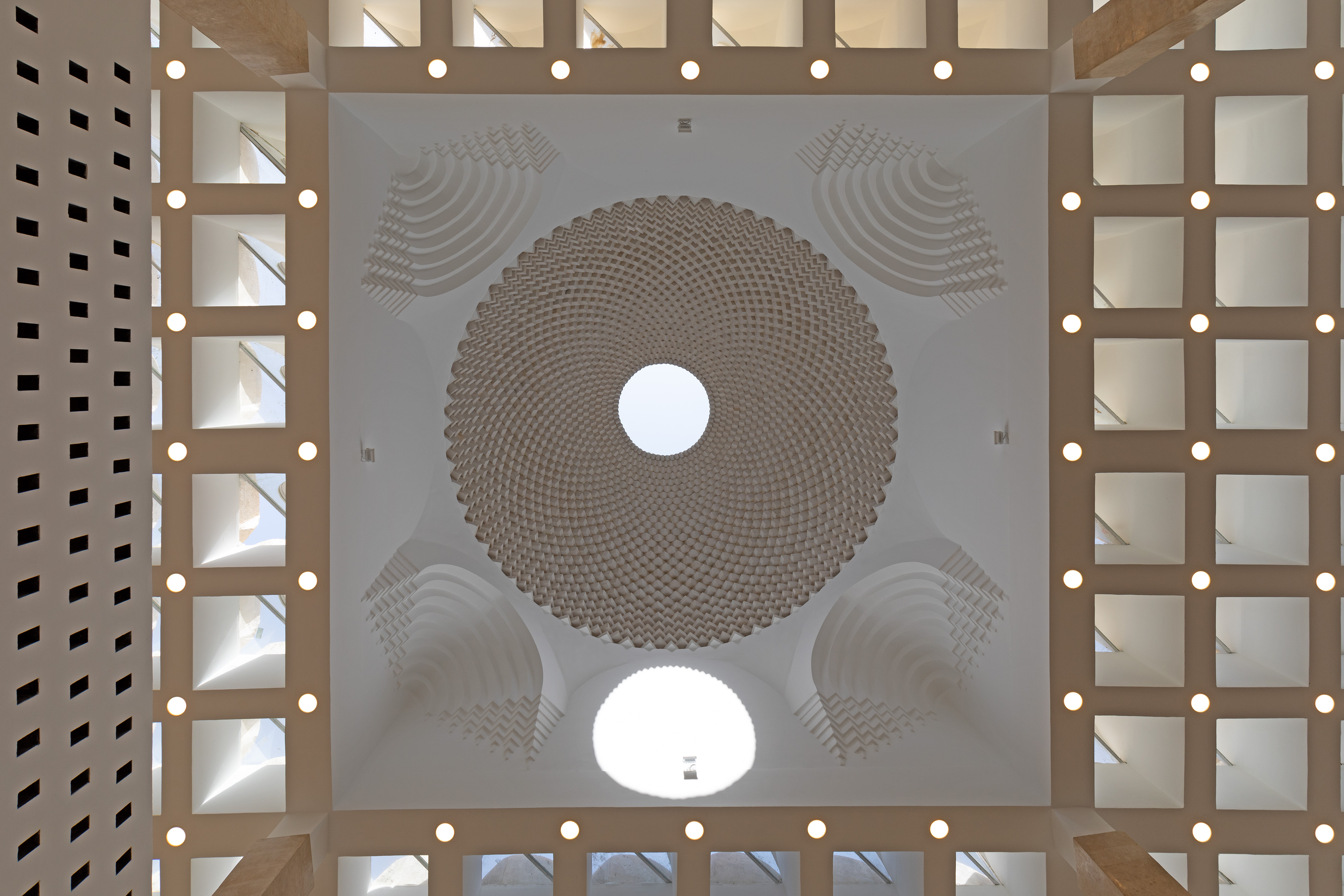
The main dome of the prayer hall

The main dome is supported by squinches that ensure a smooth transition from the square base to the dome. The squinches are in the shape of repeating recessed arcades. The architect was inspired by the wavy pattern found on Mamluk domes, such as those in the complex of Sultan Faraj ibn Barquq. The interior of the dome resembles a sunflower. Thanks to the lightweight material used in the dome's construction, the weight of the structure is reduced, allowing for smaller supporting walls and resulting in budget savings.

The roof of the structure features a hybrid roofing system consisting of a grid of concrete beams poured on-site, forming a central 6-by-6-metre (20 by 20 ft) square that highlights the main dome of the mosque. These beams create 108 smaller square openings of 0.82 by 0.82 metres (2 ft 8 in by 2 ft 8 in), partially covered with pendentive domes complemented by fixed horizontal and operable vertical glass panels. This design allows for natural ventilation within the mosque and enables indirect, glare-less sunlight to naturally illuminate the interior. Additionally, the roof is designed to collect rainwater, useful for cleaning the mosque.

The prayer hall has a single window on the eastern wall overlooking the cemetery. The number of external openings has been limited to protect worshippers from the arid climate of Basuna and the bustle of the neighborhood.

==== Mihrab and minbar ====
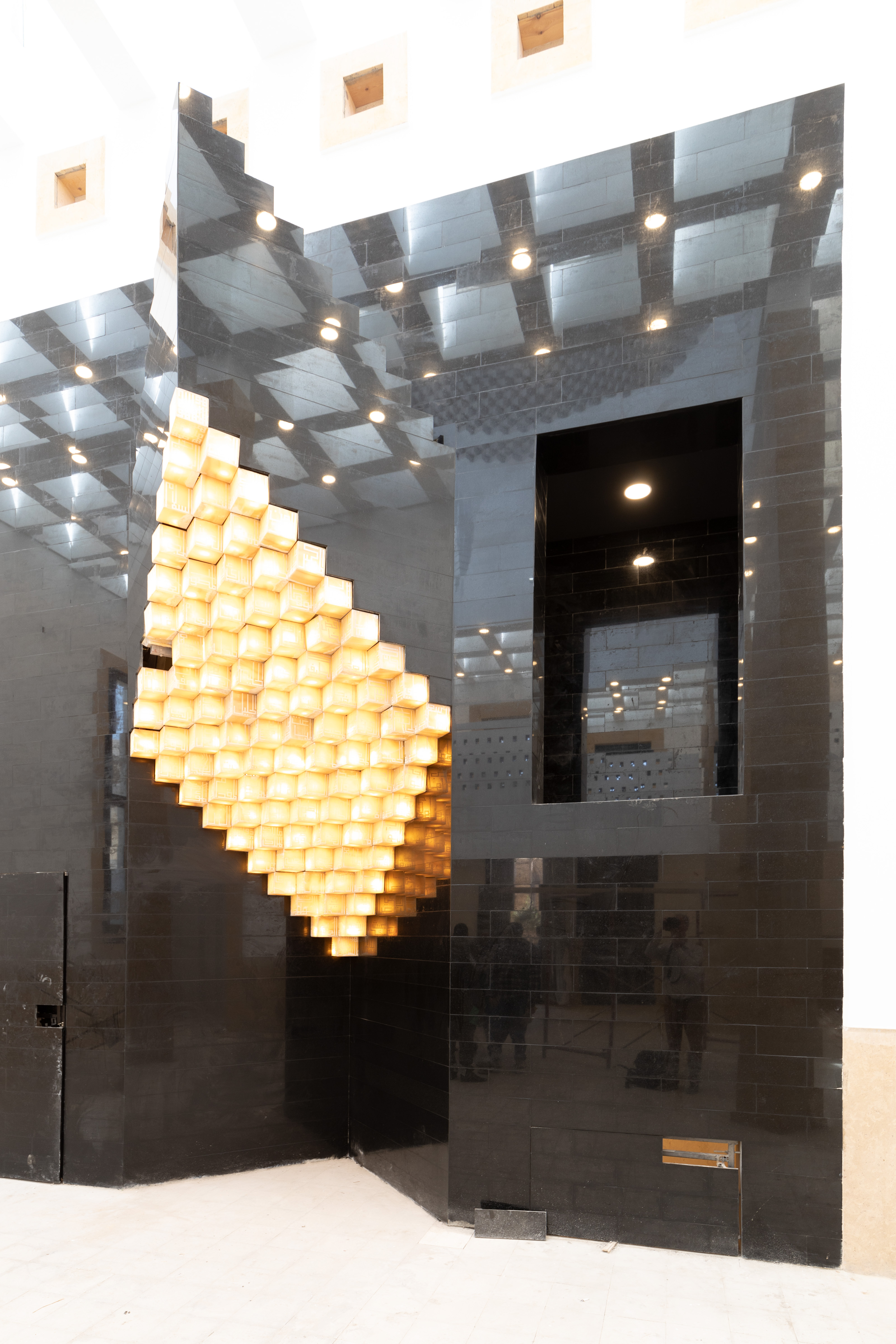
View of the mihrab and the minbar

The mihrab consists of a diamond shape formed by 99 cubes, each inscribed with one of the 99 names of Allah in square Kufic script. The cube shape is reminiscent of the Kaaba, the sacred sanctuary in Mecca toward which Muslims face during prayer. This mihrab is inspired by the artwork "The Cube of Cubes" by artist Ahmed Mostafa. It reflects the multiplicity of God's names while simultaneously symbolizing His unity. It is crafted from granite and alabaster, two local materials that were also used in ancient Egyptian architecture. The wall surrounding the mihrab is made of black marble.

The minbar is integrated into the mihrab with an opening in the qibla wall that leads to a staircase ascending to a raised platform. Thus, the minbar is not a distinct architectural element, allowing for maximization of the space dedicated to the prayer hall. This design choice not only enhances the functional use of space but also integrates the minbar seamlessly with the spiritual focus of the mihrab.

==== Multifunctional hall ====
The mosque features a multipurpose underground hall covering an area of 150 m². This space accommodates worshippers during major occasions such as Friday prayers and the month of Ramadan. Additionally, it serves as a venue for community events, including temporary medical clinics and educational support classes. This multifunctionality reflects the original purpose of mosques not only as places of worship but also as vital centers of community life.

Thus, the mosque plays a key role in fostering a strong sense of belonging among the community members to their locality. It acts as a hub for gatherings and various community activities, enhancing social cohesion and providing a space where different needs and functions can be addressed, reinforcing the mosque's role in community life.

==== Women's prayer hall ====
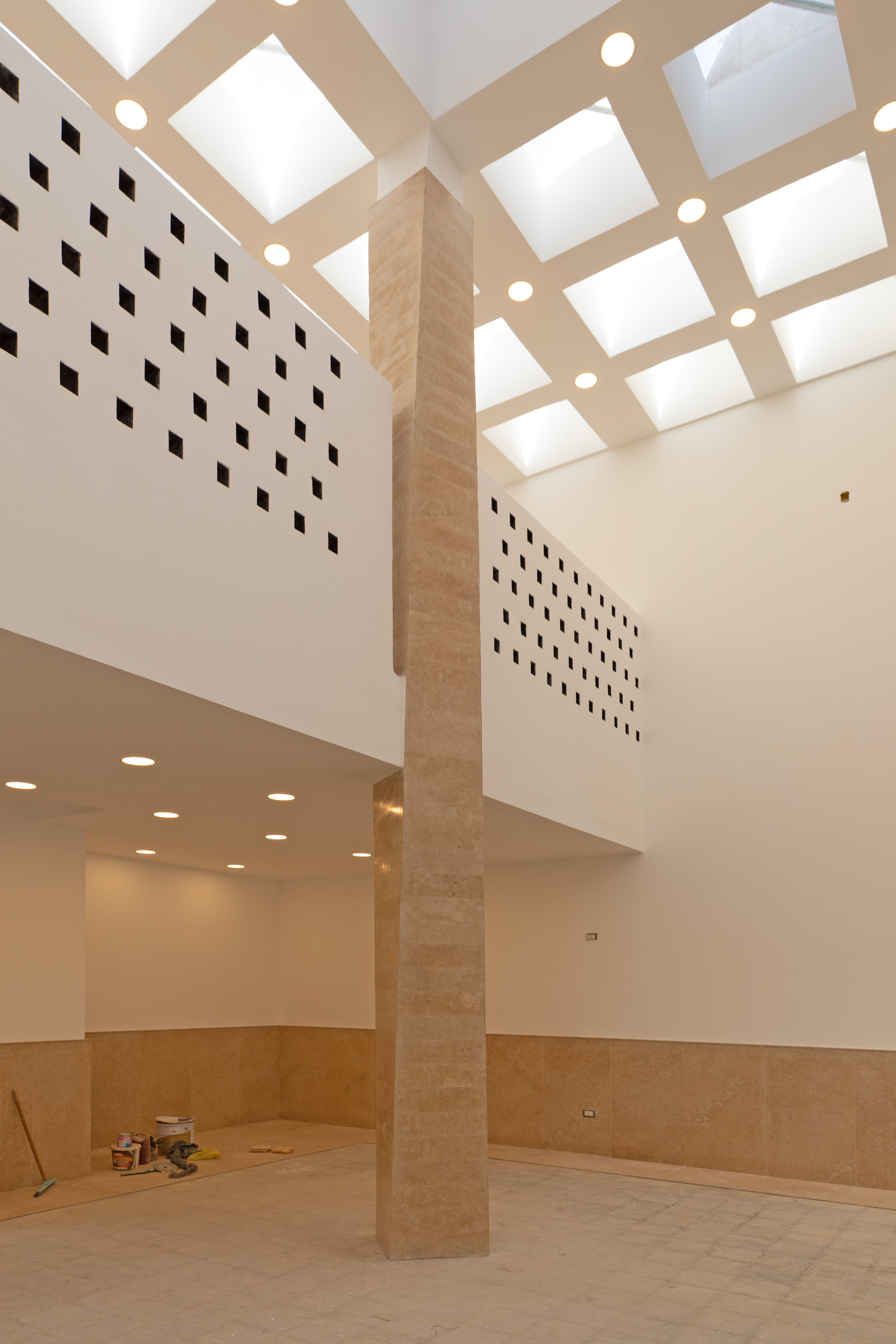
The Women's prayer hall

The Basuna Mosque is the first in the village to provide a dedicated space for women, enabling them to participate in communal prayers. This area is elevated and separated from the rest of the mosque by a wall with several rectangular openings. These openings are designed to be wider on the women's side and narrower on the Imam's side, facilitating the transmission of the Imam's voice into the women's section during prayers while ensuring that the sound from the women's section is less audible in the men's section. This design enhances both acoustical privacy and the participation of women in the religious services.

== See also ==
- Islam in Egypt
- List of mosques in Egypt
