= Mamluk Sultanate =

State in Egypt, Hejaz and Syria (1250–1517)

Mamluk Sultanate State of the Turks Dawlat al-Atrāk دولة الأتراك (Arabic) (Note: Among other similar variants. Also referred to as دولة الجراكسة ('State of the Circassians') during the Burji or Circassian Mamluk period. See Name section for details.)
- 1250–1517
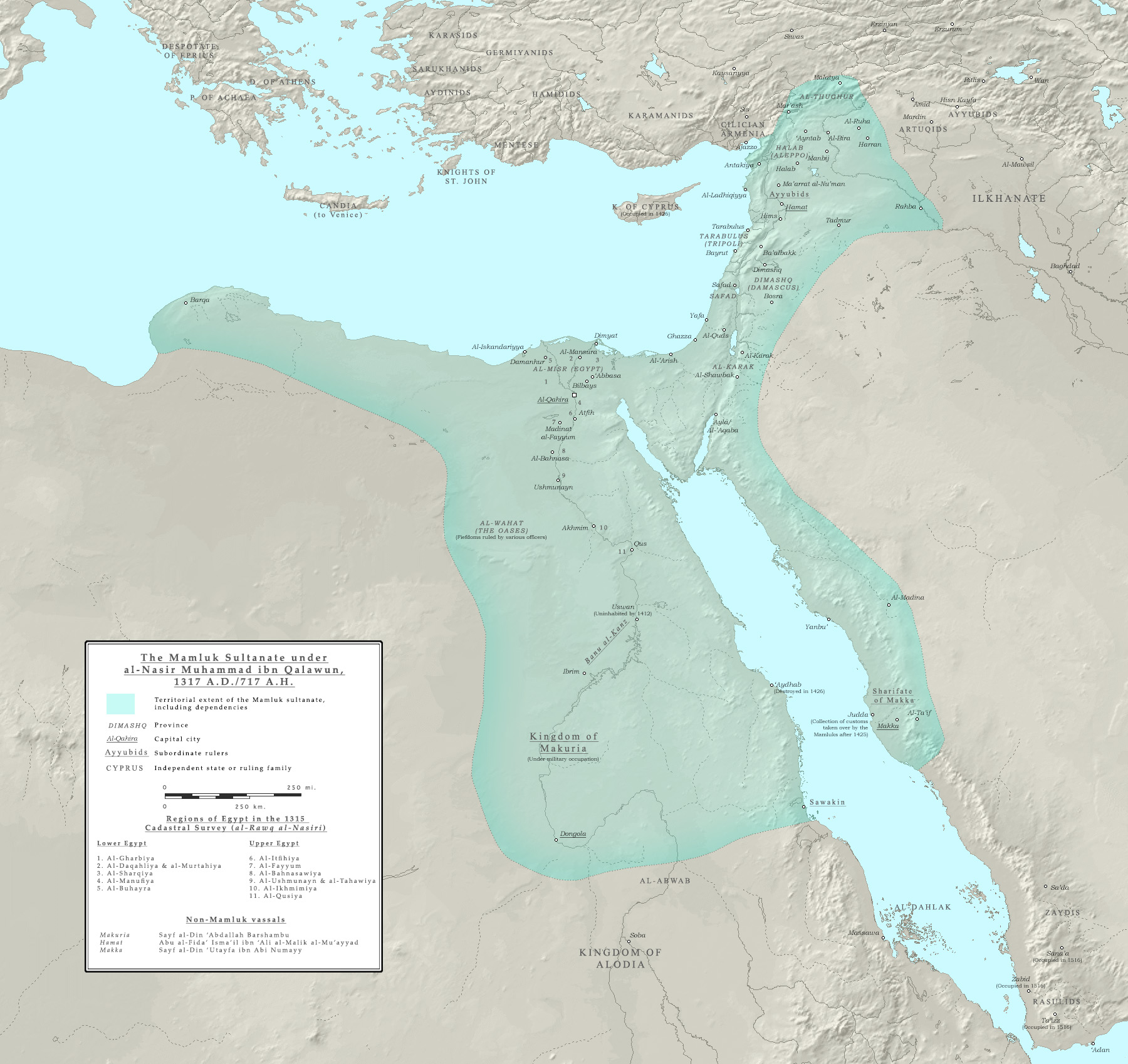
- Extent of the Mamluk Sultanate under Sultan Al-Nasir Muhammad
- Status: Sultanate with ceremonial caliphate
- Capital: Cairo
- Official languages: Arabic
- Minority languages: Mamluk-Kipchak (Note: Among Mamluk caste.); Circassian (Note: Among Mamluk caste.); Oghuz Turkic (Note: Among Mamluk caste.)
- Religion: State religion: Sunni Islam; Other: Christianity; Shia Islam; Alawism; Judaism
- Demonym: Mamluk
- Government: Semi-feudal stratocratic elective monarchy
- Caliph
  - 1261: Al-Mustansir (first)
  - 1262–1302: Al-Hakim I
  - 1406–1414: Abū al-Faḍl Al-Musta'in
  - 1508–1516: Al-Mutawakkil III (last)
- Sultan
  - 1250: Shajar al-Durr (first)
  - 1250–1257: Aybak
  - 1260–1277: Baybars
  - 1516–1517: Tuman Bay II (last)
- History
  - Murder of Turanshah: 2 May 1250
  - Barquq overthrows al-Salih Hajji; Burji rule begins: November 1382
  - Ottoman conquest of Cairo: 22 January 1517
Preceded by
Abbasid Caliphate
Ayyubid dynasty
Kingdom of Jerusalem
Principality of Antioch
County of Tripoli
Makuria
Armenian Kingdom of Cilicia
Tahirid Sultanate
Succeeded by
Ottoman Empire

The Mamluk Sultanate, (Note: Arabic: سلطنة المماليك, romanized: Salṭanat al-Mamālīk) also known as Mamluk Egypt or the Mamluk Empire, was a state that ruled Egypt, the Levant and the Hejaz from the mid-13th to early 16th centuries, with Cairo as its capital. It was ruled by a military caste of mamluks (freed slave soldiers) headed by a sultan. The sultanate was established with the overthrow of the Ayyubid dynasty in Egypt in 1250 and was conquered by the Ottoman Empire in 1517. Mamluk history is generally divided into the Turkic or Bahri period (1250–1382) and the Circassian or Burji period (1382–1517), named after the predominant ethnicity or corps of the ruling Mamluks during these respective eras.

The first rulers of the sultanate hailed from the mamluk regiments of the Ayyubid sultan al-Salih Ayyub (r. 1240–1249), usurping power from his successor in 1250. The Mamluks under Sultan Qutuz and Baybars routed the Mongols in 1260, halting their southward expansion. They then conquered or gained suzerainty over the Ayyubids' Syrian principalities. Baybars also reestablished the Abbasid dynasty of caliphs in Cairo, though their role was ceremonial. By the end of the 13th century, through the efforts of sultans Baybars, Qalawun (r. 1279–1290) and al-Ashraf Khalil (r. 1290–1293), the Mamluks had conquered the Crusader states, expanded into Makuria (Nubia), Cyrenaica, the Hejaz, and southern Anatolia. The sultanate experienced a long period of stability and prosperity during the third reign of al-Nasir Muhammad (r. 1310–1341), before giving way to the internal strife characterizing the succession of his sons, when real power was held by senior emirs.

One such emir, Barquq, overthrew the sultan in 1382 and again in 1390, inaugurating Burji rule. Mamluk authority across the empire eroded under his successors due to foreign invasions, tribal rebellions, and natural disasters, and the state entered into a long period of financial distress. Under Sultan Barsbay, major efforts were taken to replenish the treasury, particularly monopolization of trade with Europe and tax expeditions into the countryside. He also managed to impose Mamluk authority abroad, forcing Cyprus to submit in 1426. The sultanate stagnated after this. Sultan Qaitbay's long and competent reign (r. 1468–1496) ensured some stability, though it was marked by conflicts with the Ottomans. The last effective sultan was Qansuh al-Ghuri (r. 1501–1516), whose reign was known for heavy-handed fiscal policies, attempted military reforms, and confrontations with the Portuguese in the Indian Ocean. In 1516, he was killed in battle against Ottoman sultan Selim I, who subsequently conquered Egypt in 1517 and ended Mamluk rule.

Under Mamluk rule, Cairo reached the peak of its size and wealth before the modern period, becoming one of the largest cities in the world at the time. The sultanate's economy was primarily agrarian, but its geographic position also placed it at the center of trade between Europe and the Indian Ocean. The Mamluks themselves relied on the iqta' system to provide revenues. They were also major patrons of art and architecture: inlaid metalwork, enameled glass, and illuminated Qur'an manuscripts were among the high points of art, while Mamluk architecture still makes up much of the fabric of historic Cairo today and is found throughout their former domains.

== Name ==
The 'Mamluk Sultanate' is a modern historiographical term. Arabic sources throughout the Mamluk period, especially during the Bahri regime, referred to the state as Dawlat al-Atrak, Dawlat al-Turk, or al-Dawla al-Turkiyya, meaning 'State of the Turks'. During Burji rule, it was also referred to as the 'State of the Circassians' (Dawlat al-Jarakisa). These names emphasized the ethnic origin of the rulers, and Mamluk writers did not explicitly highlight their status as slaves, except on rare occasions during the Circassian period.

== History ==
=== Origins ===
The mamluk was a manumitted slave, distinguished from the ghulam, or household slave. After thorough training in martial arts, court etiquette and Islamic sciences, these slaves were freed but expected to remain loyal to their master and serve his household. Mamluks formed part of the military apparatus in Syria and Egypt since at least the 9th century, rising to become the Tulunid and Ikhshidid governing dynasties in these regions.

Mamluk regiments constituted the backbone of Egypt's military under Ayyubid rule, beginning under Sultan Saladin (r. 1174–1193), who replaced the Fatimid Caliphate's black African infantry with mamluks. Each Ayyubid sultan and high-ranking emir had a private mamluk corps. Most of the mamluks in the Ayyubids' service were ethnic Kipchak Turks from Central Asia, who, upon entering service, were converted to Sunni Islam and taught Arabic. After their manumission, mamluks were given a position in either the courtly administration or the army.

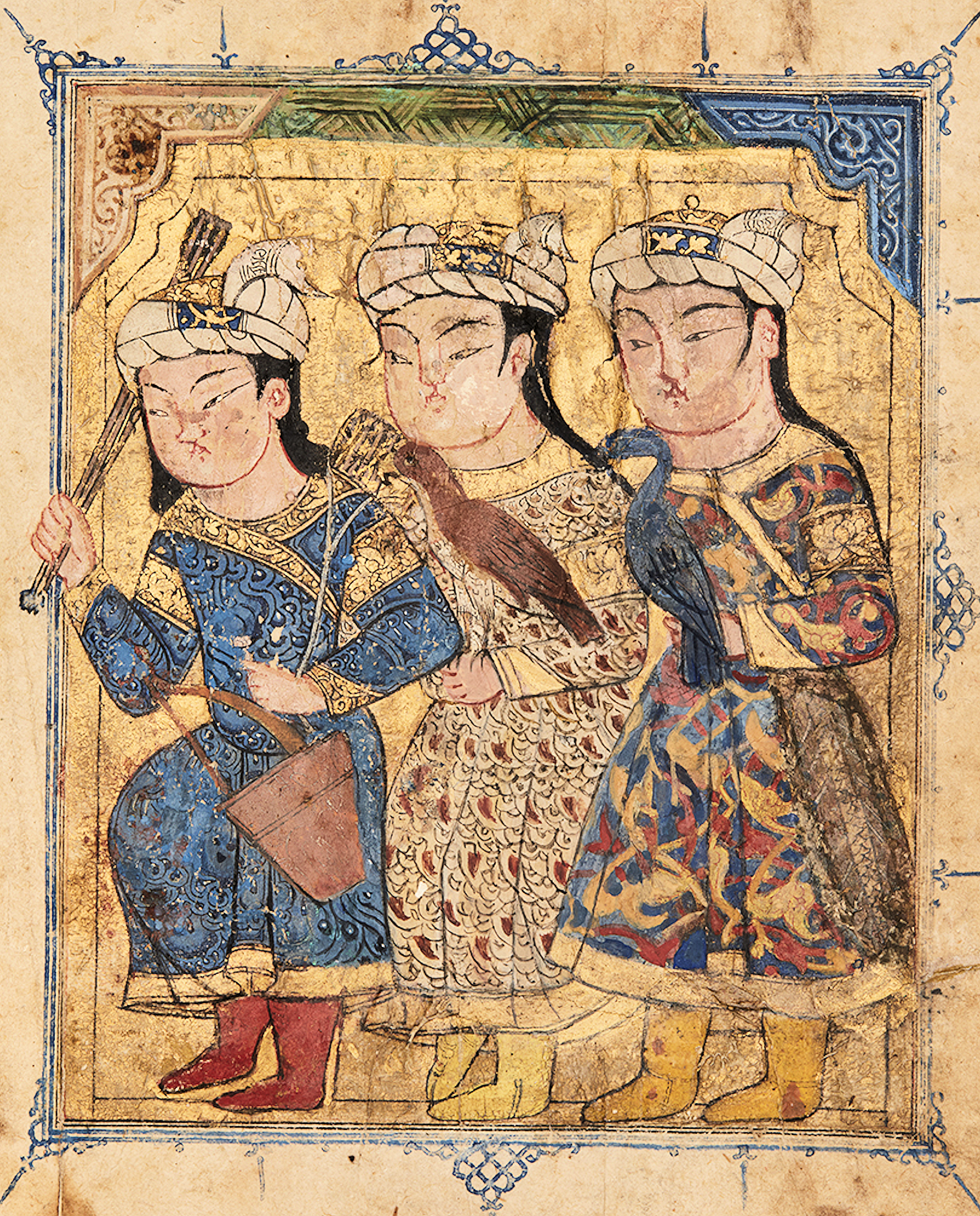
Frontispiece of Sulwan al-Muta' fi ‘Udwan al-Atba’ by Ibn Zafar al-Siqilli, Mamluk Egypt or Syria, circa 1330.

The Ayyubid sultan as-Salih Ayyub (r. 1240–1249) had acquired about one thousand mamluks, who were called the Salihiyya (sing. 'Salihi') after their master. Upon his accession, he promoted the Salihiyya, provisioning them through confiscated iqtaʿat (akin to fiefs; sing. iqtaʿ) from his predecessors' emirs and creating a loyal paramilitary apparatus so dominant that contemporaries viewed Egypt as "Salihi-ridden", according to historian Winslow William Clifford. While historian Stephen Humphreys asserts the Salihiyya's increasing dominance of the state did not personally threaten al-Salih due to their fidelity, Clifford believes the Salihiyya's autonomy fell short of such loyalty.

=== Rise to power ===
==== Conflict with the Ayyubids ====
In 1249, Louis IX of France captured Damietta during the Seventh Crusade. As the Crusaders advanced, al-Salih died and was succeeded by his Jazira (Upper Mesopotamia)-based son al-Mu'azzam Turanshah. Turanshah challenged the Salihiyya's dominance in the paramilitary apparatus by promoting his Kurdish retinue from the Jazira and Syria as a counterweight. On 11 February 1250, the Bahriyya (sing. Bahri), a junior regiment of the Salihiyya commanded by Baybars, defeated the Crusaders at the Battle of al-Mansura. On 6 April, Egypt's forces annihilated the Crusader army, capturing Louis IX. The victorious Turanshah promoted his own entourage and mamluks, the 'Mu'azzamiya', at the expense of the Salihiyya. On 2 May 1250, disgruntled Salihi emirs assassinated Turanshah at his camp in Fariskur.

An electoral college dominated by the Salihiyya convened to choose Turanshah's successor among the Ayyubid emirs, with opinion largely split between an-Nasir Yusuf of Damascus and al-Mughith Umar of al-Karak. Consensus settled on al-Salih's widow, Shajar al-Durr. She ensured the Salihiyya's paramilitary dominance and inaugurated patronage and kinship ties with them. She cultivated especially close ties with the Jamdari (pl. Jamdariyya) and Bahri corps. Her and the military's preference to preserve the Ayyubid state were evident when the army, supported by the Bahriyya and Jamdariyya, rebuffed the attempt of the Salihi mamluk and atabeg al-askar (commander of the military), Aybak, to monopolize power. The Bahriyya compelled Aybak to share power with al-Ashraf Musa, a grandson of Sultan al-Kamil (r. 1213–1238).

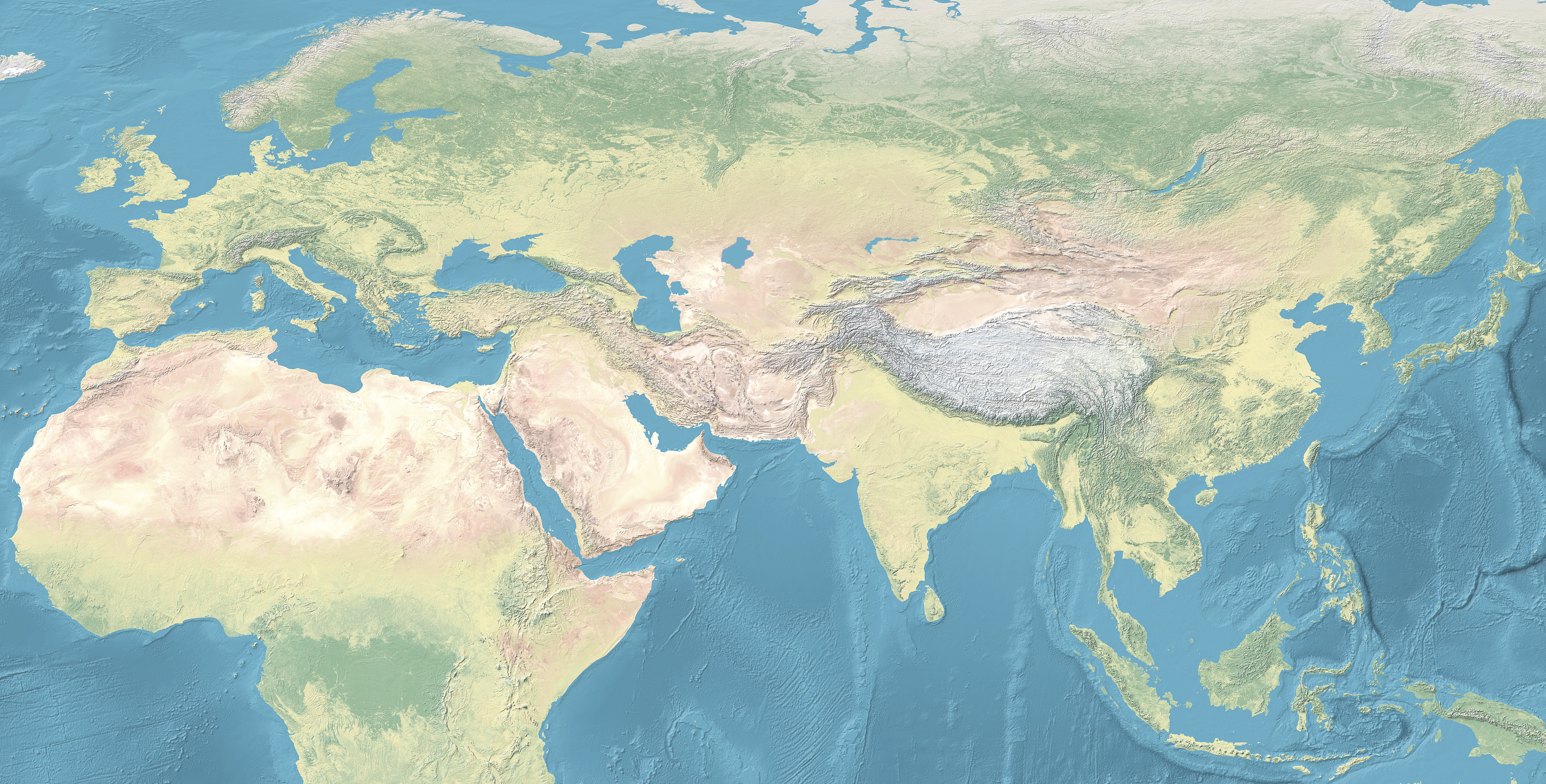
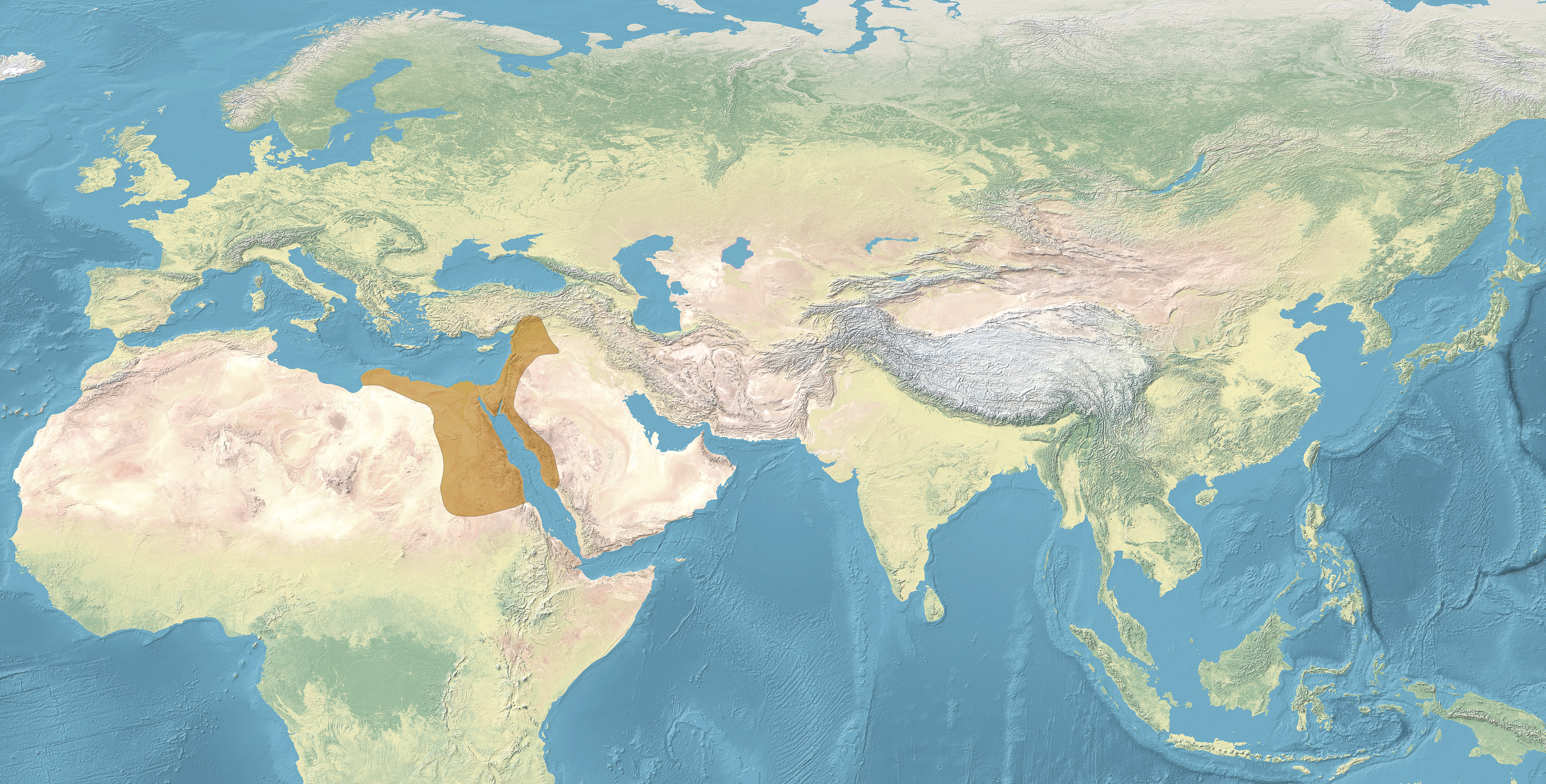
The Mamluk Sultanate and some of the main contemporary polities c. 1300. Most of the Asian continent was occupied by the Mongol Empire by that time, with Turkic polities occupying South and Western Asia, the other main one being the Delhi Sultanate in India

Aybak was the main bulwark against the Bahri and Jamdari emirs, and his promotion as atabeg al-askar led to Bahri rioting in Cairo, the first of many intra-Salihi clashes about his ascendancy. The Bahriyya and Jamdariyya were represented by their patron, Faris al-Din Aktay, a principal organizer of Turanshah's assassination. Shajar al-Durr viewed Aktay as a counterweight to Aybak. Aybak moved against the Bahriyya by shutting their Roda headquarters in 1251 and assassinating Aktay in 1254. Afterward, Aybak purged the Salihiyya of dissidents, causing a temporary exodus of Bahri mamluks to Gaza.

Aybak was assassinated on 10 April 1257, possibly on orders from Shajar al-Durr, who was assassinated a week later. Their deaths left a power vacuum in Egypt, with Aybak's teenage son, al-Mansur Ali, as heir to the sultanate and Aybak's close aide, Sayf al-Din Qutuz, as strongman. The Bahriyya and al-Mughith Umar twice attempted to conquer Egypt in November 1257 and 1258 but were defeated. Qutuz deposed Ali in 1259 and purged or arrested the Mu'izziya and any remaining Bahri mamluks in Egypt to eliminate potential opposition. The surviving Mu'izzi and Bahri mamluks rallied around Baybars, who had established an opposing shadow state in Gaza.

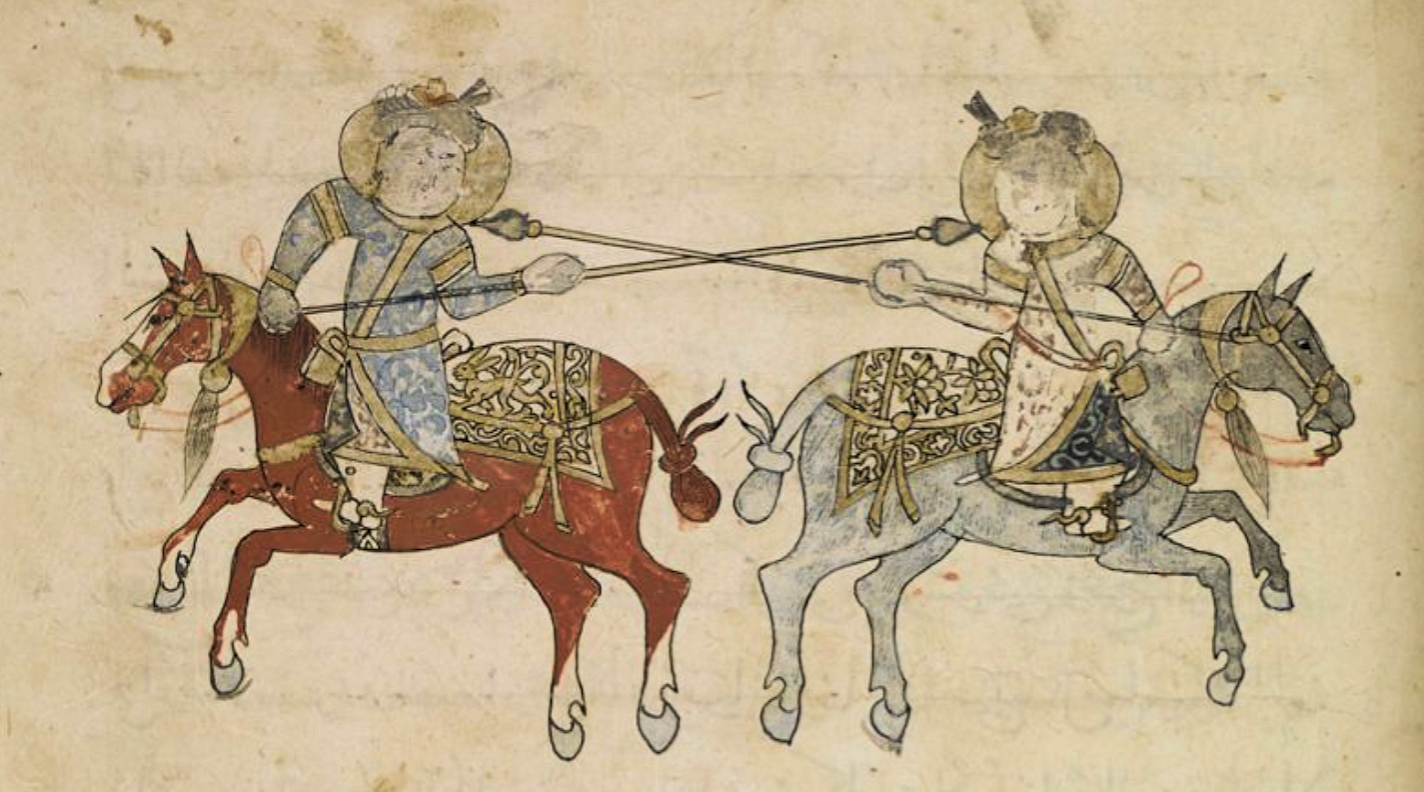
Horsemen with lances. Nihāyat al-su'l (horsemanship manual) by Aḥmad al-Miṣrī ("the Egyptian"), dated 1371, Mamluk Egypt or Syria.

While mamluk factions struggled over power, the Mongols under Hulagu Khan had sacked Baghdad, the intellectual and spiritual center of the Islamic world, in 1258, and proceeded westward, capturing Aleppo and Damascus. Qutuz sent reinforcements to his erstwhile Ayyubid enemy an-Nasir Yusuf in Syria, and reconciled with Baybars, who was allowed to return to Egypt, to face the common threat. With their unified army, Qutuz and Baybars entered Palestine and routed the Mongols under Kitbuqa at the Battle of Ain Jalut in September 1260. Afterward, the Mamluks conquered Damascus and other Syrian cities. Upon his triumphant return to Cairo, Qutuz was assassinated in a Bahri plot. Baybars then assumed power in October 1260, inaugurating Bahri rule.

=== Bahri rule (1250–1382) ===
==== Reign of Baybars ====
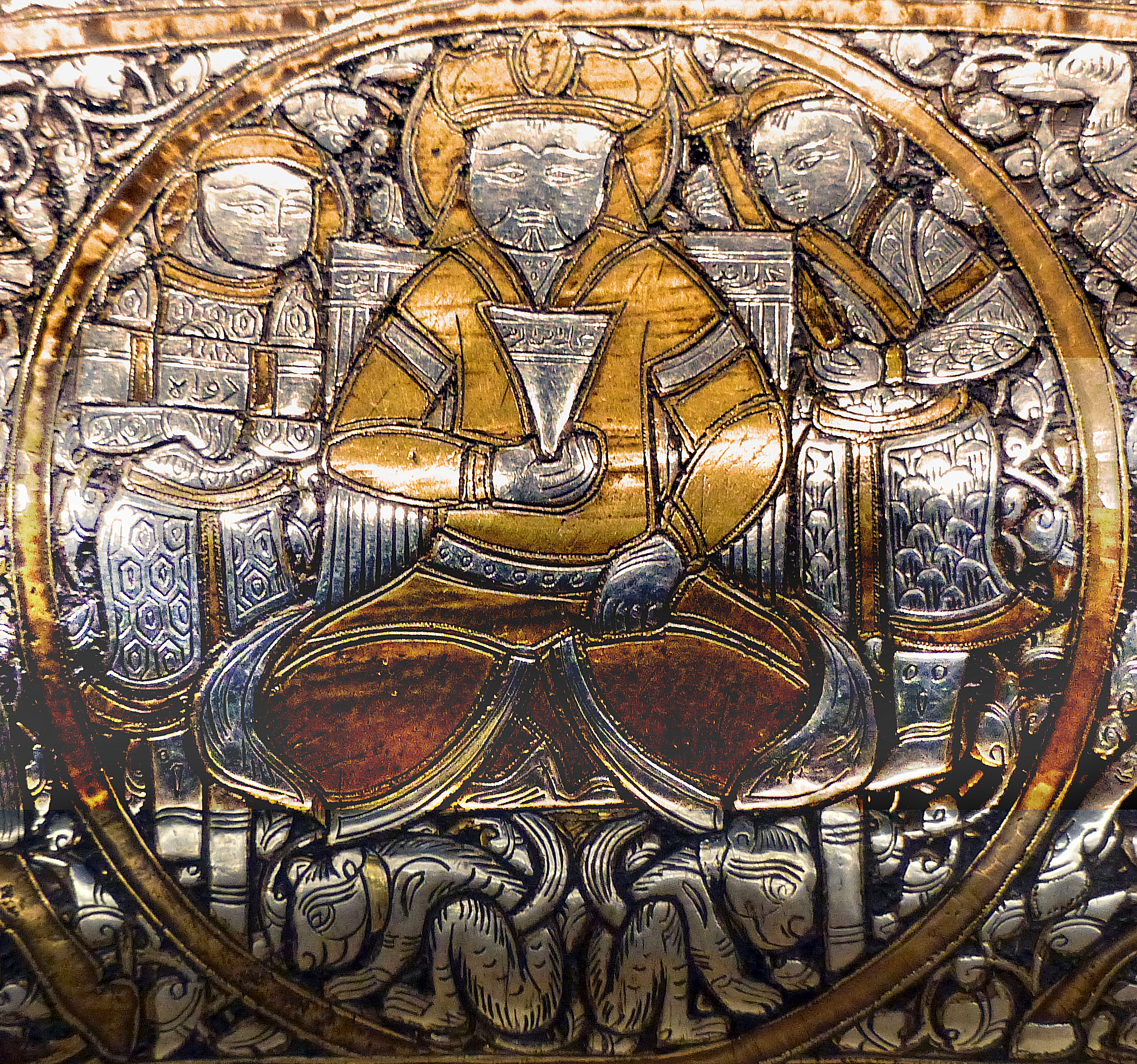
Enthroned ruler and attendants in the Baptistère de Saint Louis (1320–1340). This is a probable depiction of Sultan Baybars.

In 1263, Baybars deposed al-Mughith, thereby consolidating his authority over Islamic Syria. Baybars expanded the army from 10,000 cavalry to 40,000, with a 4,000-strong royal guard at its core. The new force was rigidly disciplined and highly trained in horsemanship, swordsmanship and archery. He established a barid (postal network) across Egypt and Syria, which entailed the wide scale building of roads and bridges along the route. His military and administrative reforms cemented the power of the Mamluk state. He diplomatically engaged the Mongols to stifle their potential alliance with Christian Europe, sow divisions between the Mongol Ilkhanate and Golden Horde empires, and maintain the flow of Turkic mamluks from Mongol-controlled Central Asia.

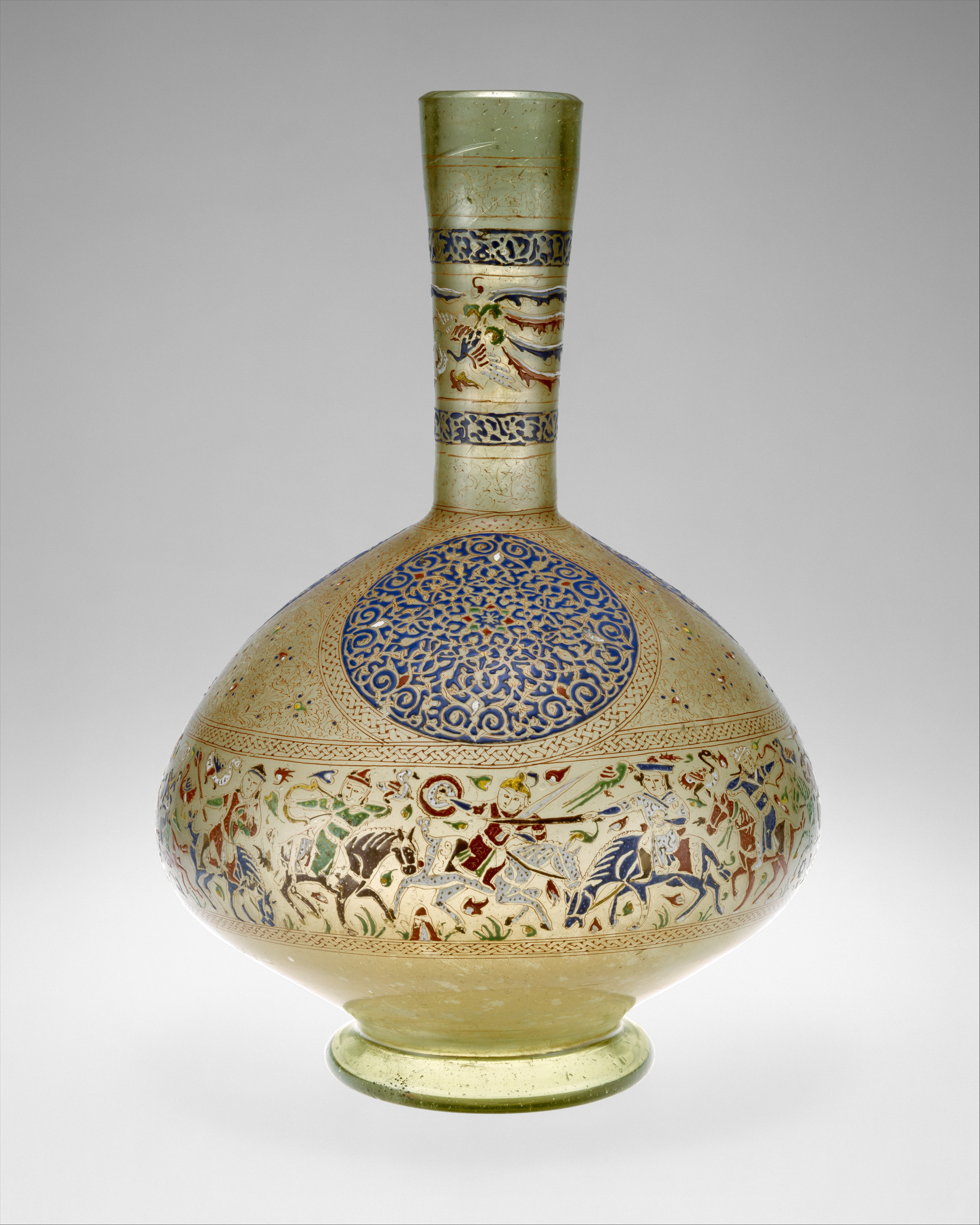
Enameled and gilded bottle with the scene of battle. Egypt, late 13th century. Metropolitan Museum of Art

With his power consolidated by 1265, Baybars launched expeditions against the Crusader fortresses across Syria, capturing Arsuf in 1265, and Halba and Arqa in 1266. Baybars captured and destroyed fortresses along the Syrian coast to prevent their potential future use by new waves of Crusaders. He often established new cities further inland, irreversibly changing settlement patterns in the region, as was the case, for example, with Ascalon whose inhabitants were moved to al-Majdal Asqalan.

In August 1266, the Mamluks launched a punitive expedition against the Armenian Cilician Kingdom for its alliance with the Mongols, laying waste to numerous Armenian villages and significantly weakening the kingdom. At around the same time, Baybars captured Safed from the Knights Templar, and shortly after, Ramla, both cities in inner Palestine. Unlike the coastal fortresses, the Mamluks strengthened and utilized the inland cities as major garrisons and administrative centers. In 1268, the Mamluks captured Jaffa before conquering the Crusader stronghold of Antioch on 18 May. In 1271, Baybars captured the major Krak des Chevaliers fortress from the County of Tripoli. Despite an alliance with the Isma'ili Shia Assassins, in July 1273, the Mamluks, who by then considered the Assassins' independence problematic, wrested control of their fortresses in the Jabal Ansariya range, including Masyaf. In 1277, Baybars launched an expedition against the Ilkhanids, routing them in Elbistan in Anatolia, but withdrew to avoid overstretching his forces and risk being cut off from Syria by a larger incoming Ilkhanid army.

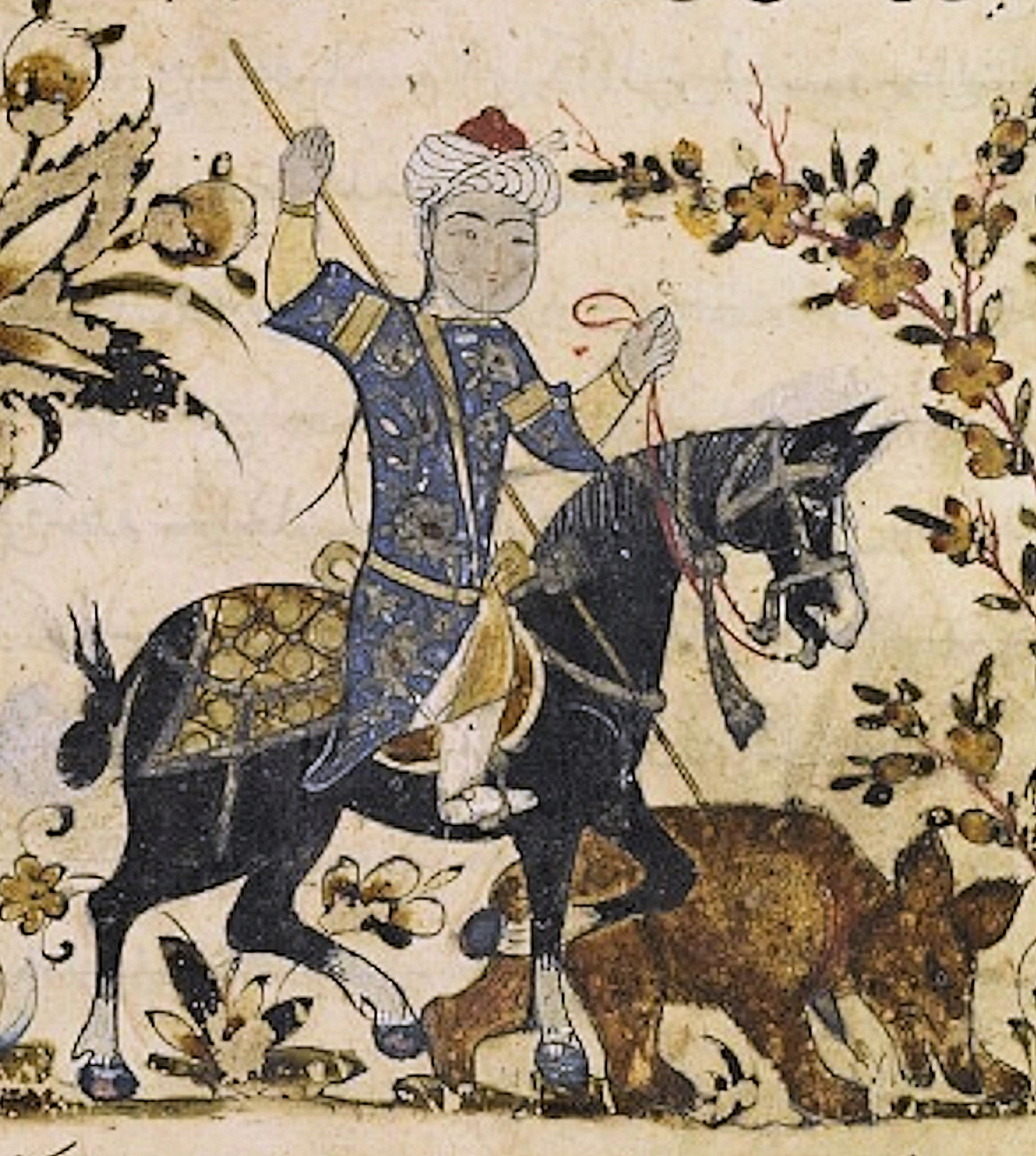
Horseman impales a bear. Nihāyat al-suʾl by Aḥmad al-Miṣrī ("the Egyptian"), dated 1371, Mamluk Egypt or Syria. He is wearing the kallawtah headgear.

To Egypt's south, Baybars had initiated an aggressive policy toward the Christian Nubian kingdom of Makuria. In 1265, the Mamluks invaded northern Makuria, forcing the Nubian king into their vassalage. Around that time, the Mamluks had conquered the Red Sea areas of Suakin and the Dahlak Archipelago. In 1268, the Makurian king, David I, overthrew the Mamluks' vassal and in 1272, raided the Mamluk Red Sea port of Aydhab. In 1276, the Mamluks defeated King David of Makuria in the Battle of Dongola and installed their ally Shakanda as king. This brought the fortress of Qasr Ibrim under Mamluk suzerainty. The conquest of Nubia was not permanent and the process of invading the region and installing vassal kings was repeated by Baybars's successors. Nonetheless, Baybars' initial conquest led to the annual expectation of tribute from the Nubians by the Mamluks until the Makurian kingdom's demise in the mid-14th century. Furthermore, the Mamluks received the submission of King Adur of al-Abwab further south.

Baybars attempted to establish his Zahirid house as the state's ruling dynasty by appointing his four-year-old son al-Sa'id Baraka as co-sultan in 1264. This represented a break from the Mamluk tradition of choosing the sultan by merit rather than lineage. In July 1277, Baybars died en route to Damascus, and was succeeded by Baraka.

==== Early Qalawuni period ====
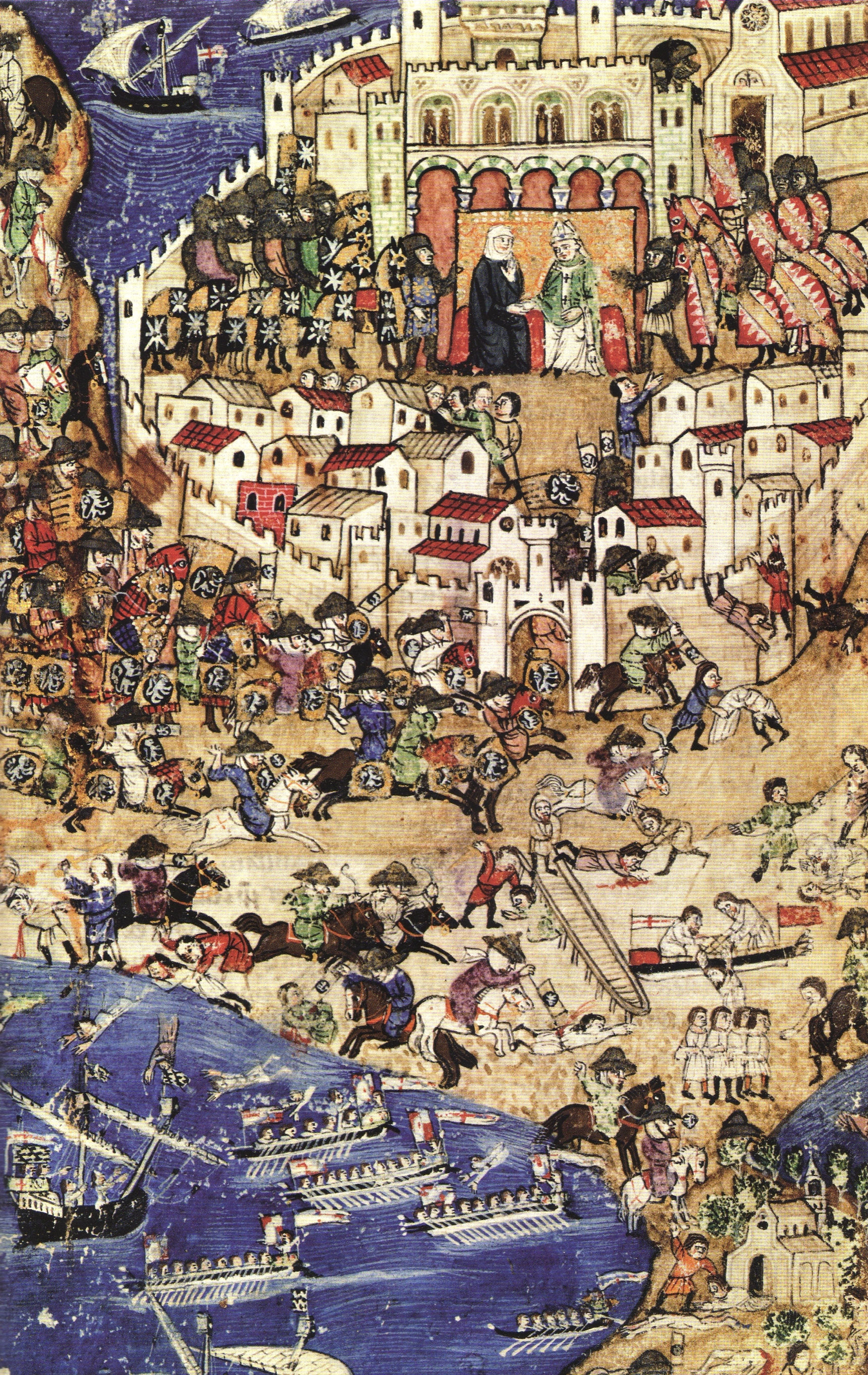
The siege of Tripoli, led against the Crusaders by the Mamluks of Qalawun in 1289

Baraka was ousted in a power struggle ending with Qalawun, a top deputy of Baybars, as sultan in November 1279. The Ilkhanids launched a massive offensive against Syria in 1281. The Mamluks were outnumbered by the 80,000-strong Ilkhanid-Armenian-Georgian-Seljuk coalition, but routed the coalition at the battle of Homs, confirming Mamluk dominance in Syria. The Ilkhanids' rout enabled Qalawun to proceed against Crusader holdouts in Syria and in May 1285, he captured and garrisoned the Marqab fortress.

Qalawun's early reign was marked by policies intended to garner support from the merchant class, the Muslim bureaucracy and the religious establishment. He eliminated the illegal taxes that burdened the merchants and commissioned extensive building and renovation projects for Islam's holiest sites, such as the Prophet's Mosque in Medina, the al-Aqsa Mosque in Jerusalem and the Ibrahimi Mosque in Hebron. His building activities later shifted to more secular and personal purposes, including his large, multi-division hospital complex in Cairo. After the détente with the Ilkhanids, Qalawun suppressed internal dissent by imprisoning dozens of high-ranking emirs in Egypt and Syria. He diversified the hitherto mostly Turkic mamluk ranks by purchasing numerous non-Turks, particularly Circassians, forming out of them the Burjiyya regiment.

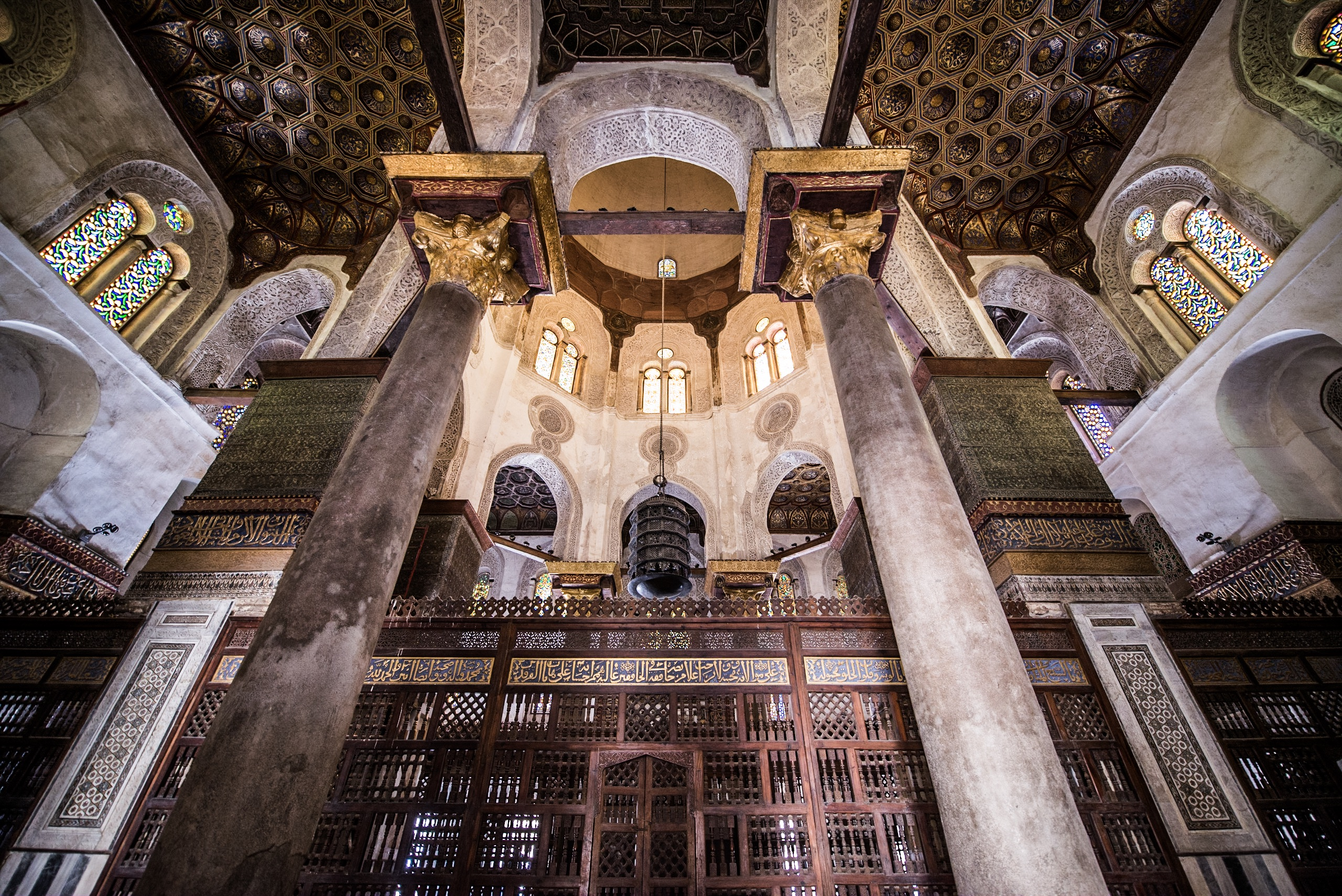
Interior of the Mausoleum of Sultan Qalawun in Cairo (1284–1285)

Qalawun was the last Salihi sultan and after his death in 1290, his son, al-Ashraf Khalil, drew legitimacy by emphasizing his lineage from Qalawun. Like his predecessors, Khalil's main priorities were organizing the state apparati, defeating the Crusaders and Mongols, integrating Syria, and preserving the flow of new mamluks and weaponry into the empire. Baybars had purchased 4,000 mamluks, Qalawun 6,000–7,000 and by the end of Khalil's reign, there was an estimated total of 10,000 mamluks in the sultanate. In 1291, Khalil captured Acre, the last major Crusader stronghold in Palestine and Mamluk rule consequently extended across all of Syria.

Khalil's death in 1293 led to a period of factional strife, with Khalil's prepubescent brother, al-Nasir Muhammad, being overthrown the following year by an ethnic Mongol mamluk of Qalawun, al-Adil Kitbugha, who in turn was succeeded by a Greek mamluk of Qalawun, Husam al-Din Lajin. To consolidate control, Lajin redistributed iqtaʿat to his supporters. He was unable to keep power and al-Nasir Muhammad was restored as sultan in 1298, ruling over a fractious realm until being toppled by Baybars II, a Circassian mamluk of Qalawun, who was wealthier, and more pious and cultured than his immediate predecessors.

Early into al-Nasir Muhammad's second reign, the Ilkhanids, whose leader Mahmud Ghazan was a Muslim convert, had invaded Syria and routed a Mamluk army near Homs in the Battle of Wadi al-Khaznadar in 1299. Ghazan largely withdrew from Syria shortly after and the residual Ilkhanid force retreated in 1300 at the approach of the rebuilt Mamluk army. Another Ilkhanid invasion in 1303 was repulsed after a Mamluk victory at the Battle of Marj al-Suffar in the plains south of Damascus.

==== Third reign of al-Nasir Muhammad ====
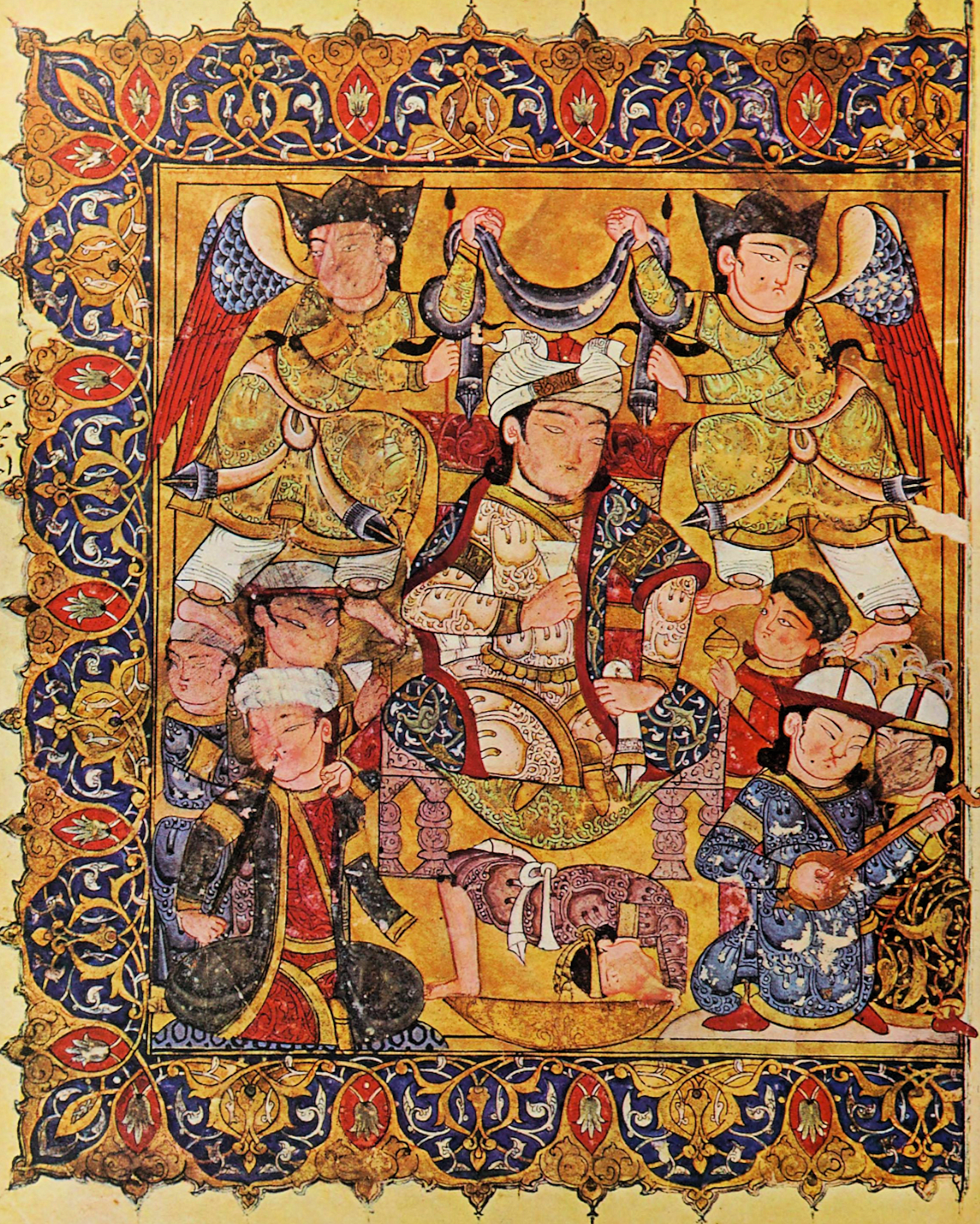
Mamluk court scene, with possible depiction of Mamluk Sultan al-Nasir Muhammad. Probably Egypt, dated 1334. Maqamat of al-Hariri. "In the paintings the facial cast of these [ruling] Turks is obviously reflected, and so are the special fashions and accoutrements they favored". The brimmed hats in the bottom right corner are Mongol. Al-Nasir Muhammad was himself of Kipchak (Turkic) and Mongol descent.

Baybars II ruled for roughly one year before al-Nasir Muhammad became sultan again in 1310, this time ruling for over three decades in a period often considered by historians to be the zenith of the Mamluk empire. To avoid the experiences of his previous two reigns where the mamluks of Qalawun and Khalil held sway and periodically assumed power, al-Nasir Muhammad established a centralized autocracy. In 1310, he imprisoned, exiled or killed any Mamluk emirs that supported those who toppled him in the past, including the Burji mamluks. He assigned iqta'at to over thirty of his own mamluks. Initially, he left most of his father's mamluks undisturbed, but in 1311 and 1316, he imprisoned and executed most of them, and again redistributed iqta'at to his own mamluks. By 1316, the number of mamluks decreased to 2,000. Al-Nasir Muhammad further consolidated power by replacing Caliph al-Mustakfi (r. 1302–1340) with his own appointee, al-Wathiq, as well as compelling the qadi (head judge) to issue legal rulings advancing his interests.

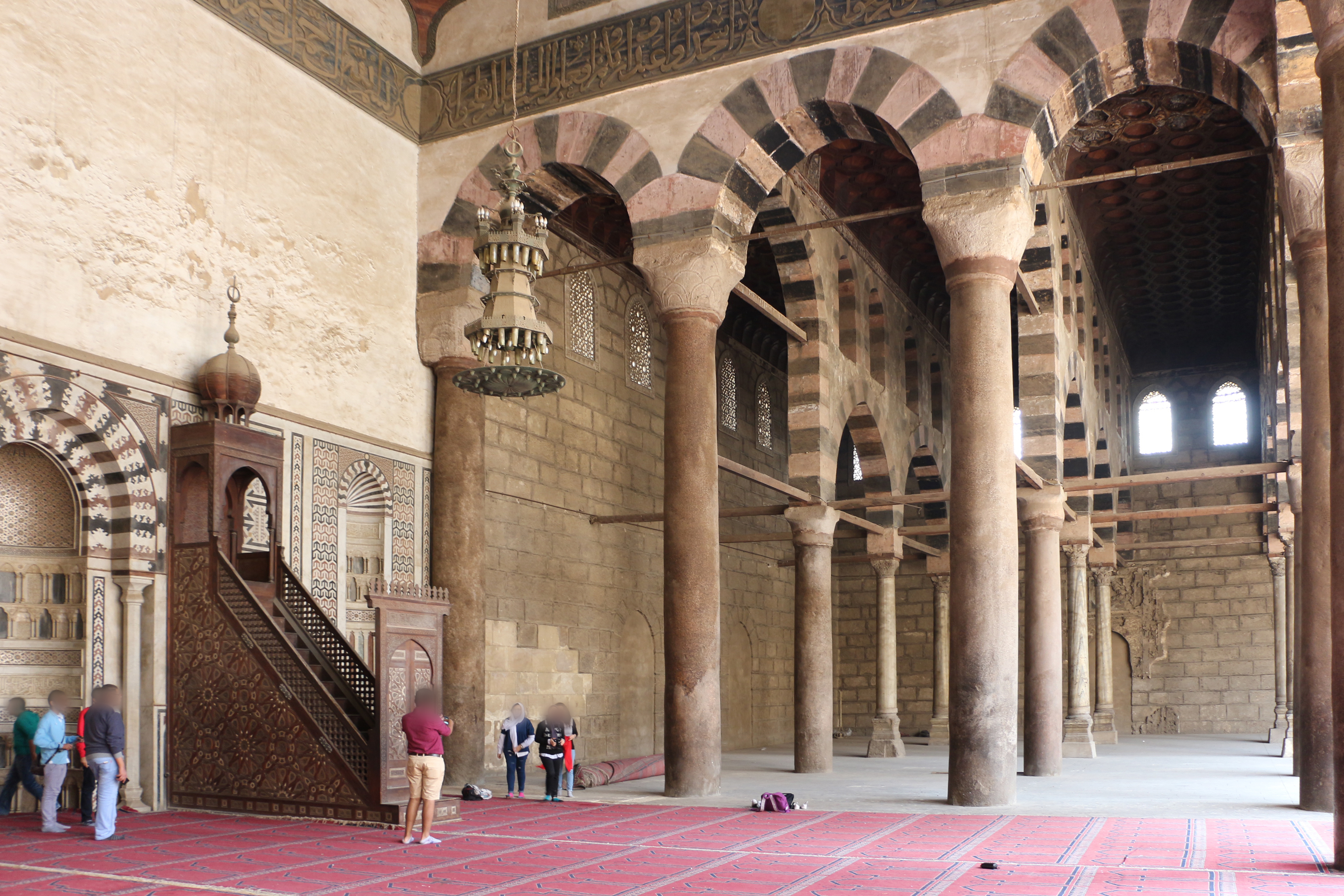
Interior of the Al-Nasir Muhammad Mosque in the Citadel of Cairo (1318–1335)

Under al-Nasir Muhammad, the Mamluks repulsed an Ilkhanid invasion of Syria in 1313 and concluded a peace treaty with the Ilkhanate in 1322, bringing a long-lasting end to the Mamluk–Mongol wars. Afterward, al-Nasir Muhammad ushered in a period of stability and prosperity through the enactment of major political, economic and military reforms ultimately intended to ensure his continued rule and consolidate the Qalawuni–Bahri regime. Concurrent with his reign was the disintegration of the Ilkhanate into several smaller dynastic states and the consequent Mamluk effort to establish diplomatic and commercial relationships with the new states. Amid conditions reducing the flow of mamluks from the Mongol territories to the sultanate, al-Nasir Muhammad compensated by adopting new methods of training, and military and financial advancement that introduced a great level of permissiveness. This led to relaxed conditions for new mamluks and encouraged the pursuit of military careers in Egypt by aspiring mamluks outside of the empire.

==== End of the Bahri regime ====
Al-Nasir Muhammad died in 1341 and his rule was followed by a succession of descendants in a period marked by political instability. Most of his successors, except for al-Nasir Hasan (r. 1347–1351, 1354–1361) and al-Ashraf Sha'ban (r. 1363–1367), were sultans in name only, with the patrons of the leading mamluk factions holding actual power. The first of al-Nasir Muhammad's sons to accede was al-Mansur Abu Bakr, who al-Nasir Muhammad designated as successor. Al-Nasir Muhammad's senior aide, Qawsun, held real power and imprisoned and executed Abu Bakr and had al-Nasir Muhammad's infant son, al-Ashraf Kujuk, appointed instead. By January 1342, Qawsun and Kujuk were toppled, and the latter's half-brother, al-Nasir Ahmad of al-Karak, was declared sultan. Ahmad relocated to al-Karak and left a deputy to govern in Cairo. This unorthodox arrangement, together with his seclusive and frivolous behavior and his execution of loyal partisans, ended with Ahmad's deposition and replacement by his half-brother al-Salih Isma'il in June 1342. Isma'il ruled until his death in August 1345, and was succeeded by his brother al-Kamil Sha'ban. The latter was killed in a mamluk revolt and was succeeded by his brother al-Muzaffar Hajji, who was also killed in a mamluk revolt in late 1347.

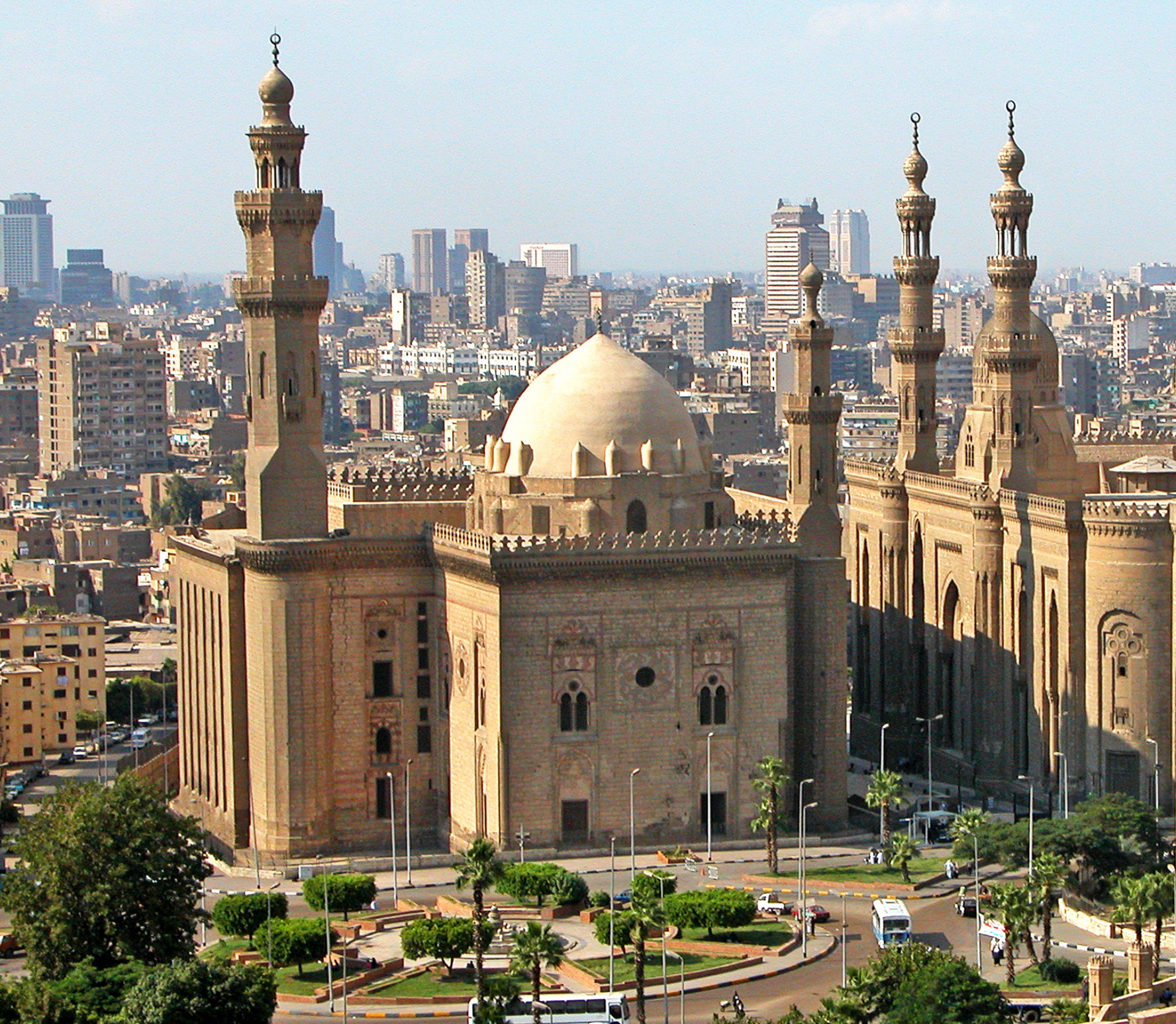
The complex of Sultan Hasan (1356–1363) is the largest and costliest Mamluk building in Cairo, despite being built in a time of plague.

After Hajji's death, the senior emirs hastily appointed another son of al-Nasir Muhammad, the twelve-year-old al-Nasir Hasan. Coinciding with Hasan's first reign, in 1347–1348, the Bubonic Plague arrived in Egypt and other plagues followed, causing mass death in the country, which led to major social and economic changes in the region. In 1351, the senior emirs, led by Emir Taz, ousted and replaced Hasan with his brother, al-Salih Salih. The emirs Shaykhu and Sirghitmish deposed Salih and restored Hasan in 1355, after which Hasan gradually purged Taz, Shaykhu and Sirghitmish and their mamluks from his administration. Hasan recruited and promoted the awlad al-nas (descendants of mamluks who did not undergo the enslavement/manumission process) in the military and administration, a process lasted for the remainder of the Bahri period. This caused resentment among Hasan's own mamluks, led by Emir Yalbugha al-Umari, who killed Hasan in 1361.

Yalbugha became regent to Hasan's successor, the young son of the late sultan Hajji, al-Mansur Muhammad. By then, mamluk solidarity and loyalty to the emirs had dissipated. To restore discipline and unity within the Mamluk state and military, Yalbugha revived the rigorous training of mamluks used under Baybars and Qalawun. In 1365, a Mamluk attempt to annex Armenia, which had since replaced Crusader Acre as the Christian commercial foothold of Asia, was stifled by an invasion of Alexandria by Peter I of Cyprus. The Mamluks concurrently experienced a deterioration of their lucrative position in international trade and the economy declined, further weakening the Bahri regime. Meanwhile, the harshness of Yalbugha's educational methods and his refusal to rescind his disciplinary reforms provoked a mamluk backlash. Yalbugha was killed by his mamluks in an uprising in 1366. The rebels were supported by Sultan al-Ashraf Sha'ban, who Yalbugha had installed in 1363. Sha'ban ruled as the real power in the sultanate until 1377, when he was killed by mamluk dissidents on his way to Mecca perform the Hajj.

=== Burji rule (1382–1517) ===
==== Reign of Barquq ====
Sha'ban was succeeded by his seven-year-old son al-Mansur Ali, though the oligarchy of the senior emirs held the reins of power. Among the senior emirs who rose to prominence under Ali were Barquq and Baraka, both Circassian mamluks of Yalbugha. Barquq was made atabeg al-asakir in 1378, giving him command of the Mamluk army, which he used to oust Baraka in 1380. Ali died in May 1381 and was succeeded by his nine-year-old brother, al-Salih Hajji, with real power held by Barquq as regent. The next year, Barquq toppled al-Salih Hajji and assumed the throne.

His accession was enabled by Yalbugha's mamluks, whose corresponding rise to power left Barquq vulnerable. His rule was challenged by a revolt in Syria in 1389 by the Mamluk governors of Malatya and Aleppo, Mintash and Yalbugha al-Nasiri, the latter a mamluk of Yalbugha. The rebels took over Syria and headed for Egypt, prompting Barquq to abdicate in favor of al-Salih Hajji. The alliance between Yalbugha al-Nasiri and Mintash soon fell apart and factional fighting ensued in Cairo, with Mintash ousting Yalbugha. Barquq was arrested and exiled to al-Karak where he rallied support. In Cairo, Barquq's loyalists took the citadel and arrested al-Salih Hajji. This paved the way for Barquq's usurpation of the sultanate once more in February 1390, firmly establishing the Burji regime. The ruling Mamluks of this period were mostly Circassians drawn from the Christian population of the northern Caucasus.

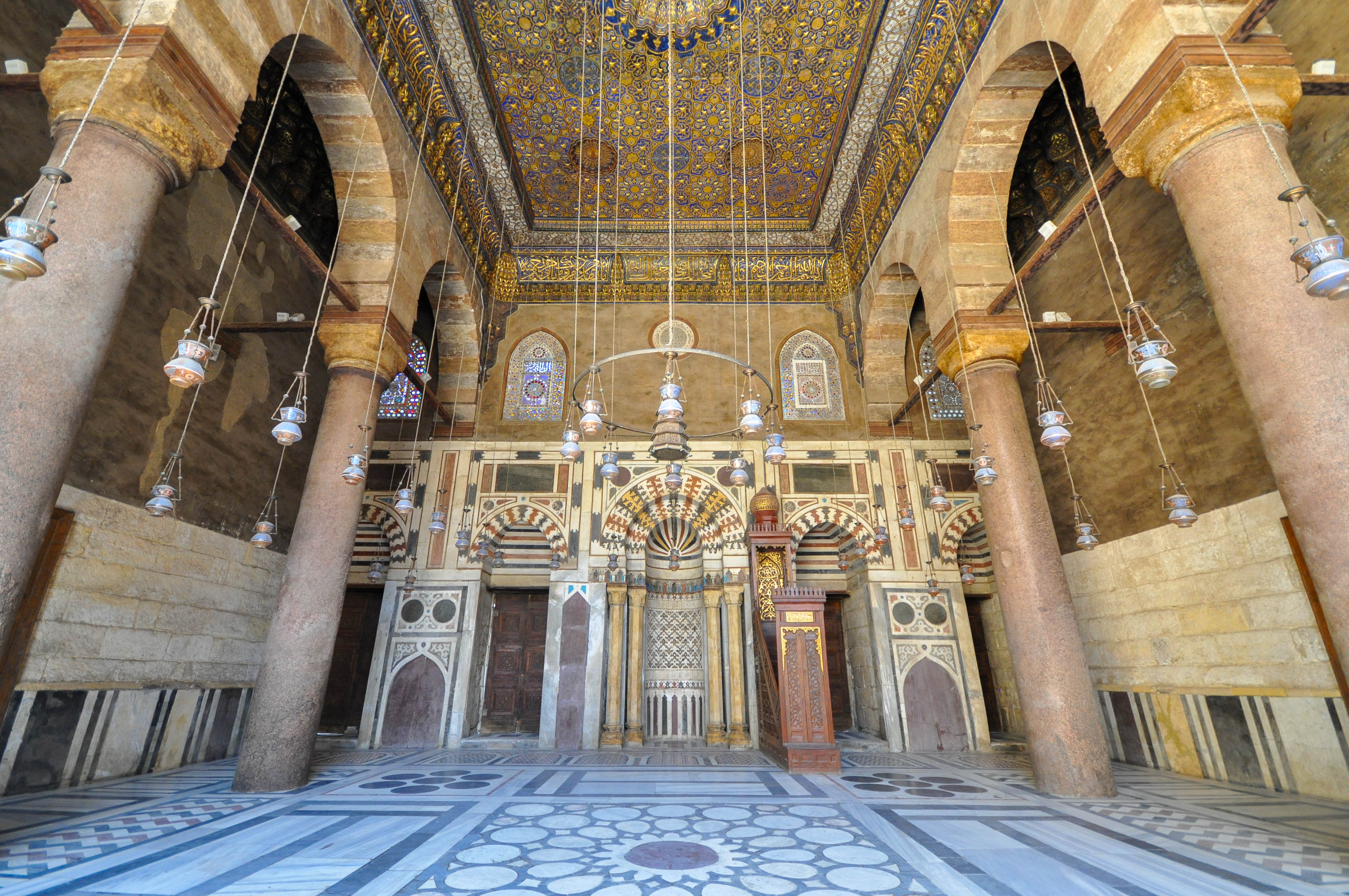
Interior of the Mosque-Madrasa of Sultan Barquq in Cairo (1384–1386)

Barquq solidified power in 1393, when his forces killed the major opponent to his rule, Mintash, in Syria. Barquq oversaw the mass recruitment of Circassians (estimated at 5,000 recruits) into the mamluk ranks and the restoration of the state's authority throughout its realm in the tradition of Baybars and Qalawun. A major innovation to this system was the division of Egypt into three niyabat (sing. niyaba; provinces), similar to the administrative divisions in Syria. The new Egyptian niyabat were Alexandria, Damanhur and Asyut. Barquq instituted this to better control the Egyptian countryside from the rising strength of the Bedouin tribes. He further dispatched the Berber Hawwara tribesmen of the Nile Delta to Upper Egypt to check the Arab Bedouins.

During Barquq's reign, in 1387, the Mamluks had forced the Anatolian entity in Sivas to become a Mamluk vassal. Towards the end of the 14th century, challengers to the Mamluks emerged in Anatolia, including the Ottoman dynasty and the Turkmen allies of Timur, the Aq Qoyunlu and Qara Qoyunlu tribes of southern and eastern Anatolia.

==== Crises and restoration of state power ====
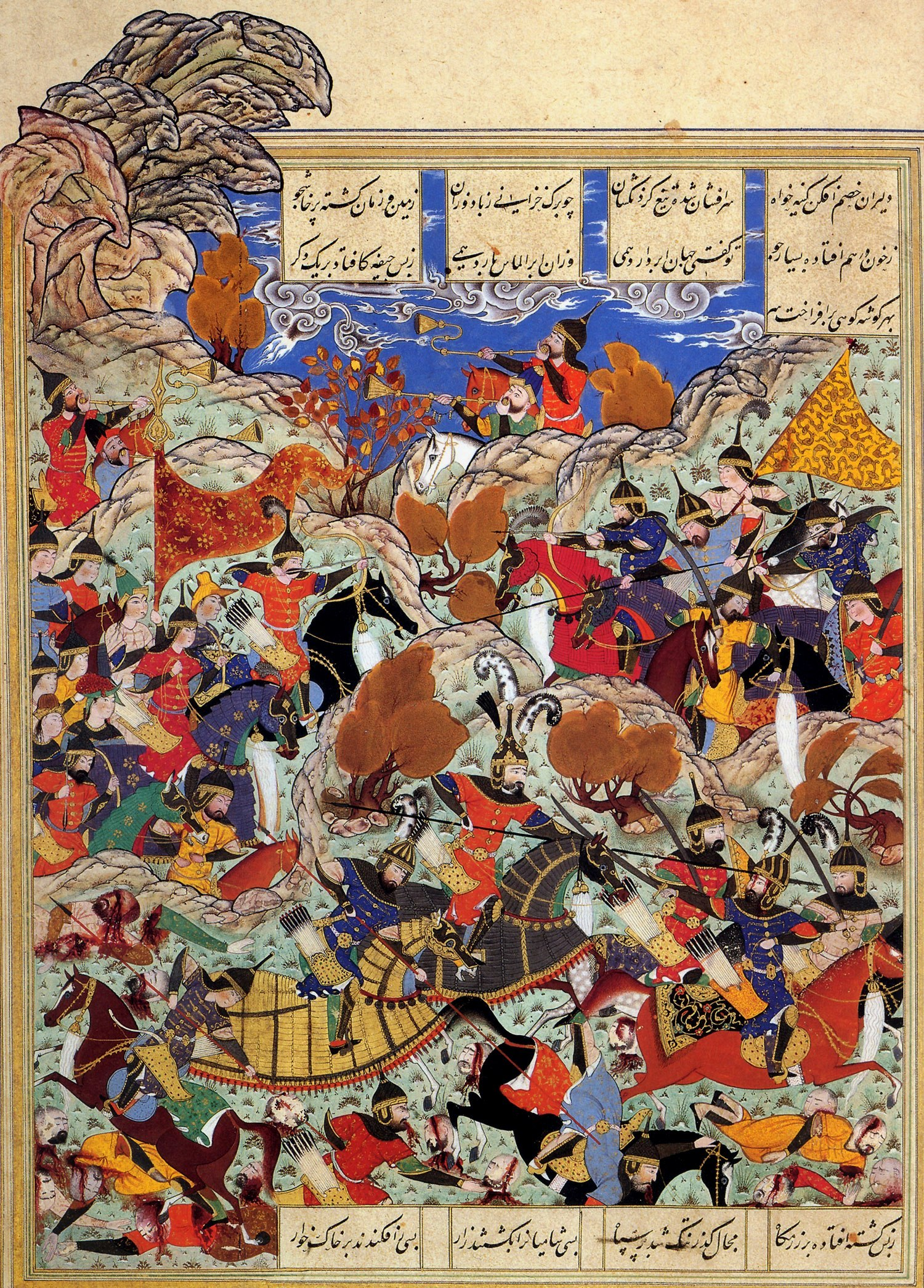
Battle between the troops of Timur (left) and the Mamluk troops of al-Nasir Faraj (right)

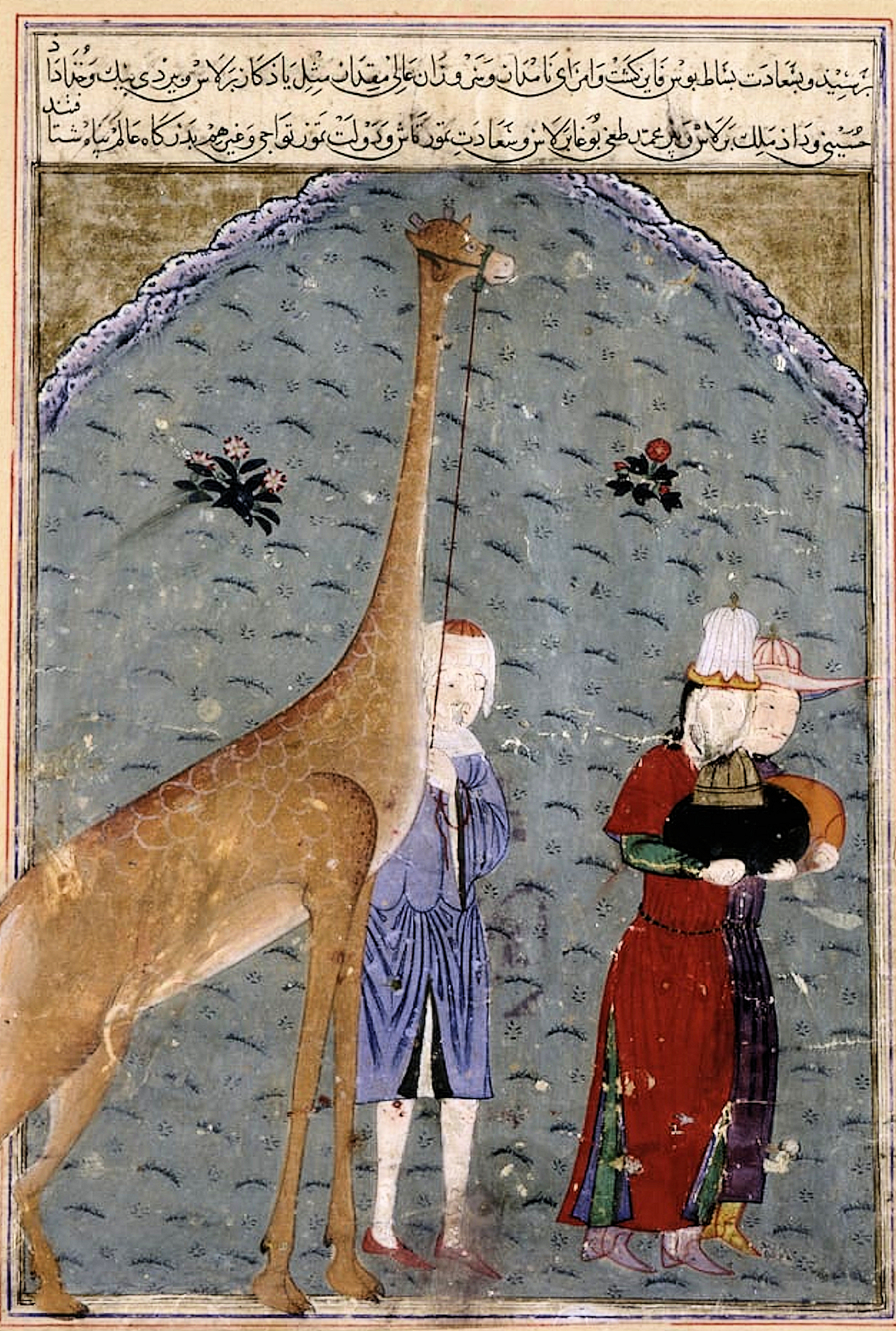
Ambassadors of al-Nasir Faraj present tribute, including a giraffe, to Timur

Barquq died in 1399 and was succeeded by his eleven-year-old son, an-Nasir Faraj. That year, Timur invaded Syria, sacking Aleppo and Damascus. Timur ended his occupation of Syria in 1402 to fight the Ottomans in Anatolia, whom he deemed a more dangerous threat. Faraj held onto power during this turbulent period, which, in addition to Timur's devastating raids, the rise of Turkmen tribes in the Jazira, and attempts by Barquq's emirs to topple Faraj, also saw a famine in Egypt in 1403, a severe plague in 1405 and a Bedouin revolt that practically ended Mamluk control of Upper Egypt between 1401 and 1413. Mamluk authority throughout the sultanate significantly eroded, while the capital Cairo underwent an economic crisis.

Faraj was toppled in 1412 by the Syria-based emirs, Tanam, Jakam, Nawruz and al-Mu'ayyad Shaykh, against whom Faraj had sent seven military expeditions. The emirs could not usurp the throne themselves, and had Caliph al-Musta'in (r. 1406–1413) installed as a puppet sultan; the caliph had the support of the non-Circassian mamluks and legitimacy with the local population. Six months later, Shakyh ousted al-Musta'in after neutralizing his main rival, Nawruz, and assumed the sultanate. Shaykh's main policy was restoring state authority within the empire, which experienced further plagues in 1415–1417 and 1420. Shaykh replenished the treasury through tax collection expeditions akin to raids across the empire to compensate the tax arrears that accumlated under Faraj. Shaykh also commissioned and led military campaigns against the Mamluks' enemies in Anatolia, reasserting the state's influence there.

==== Reign of Barsbay ====
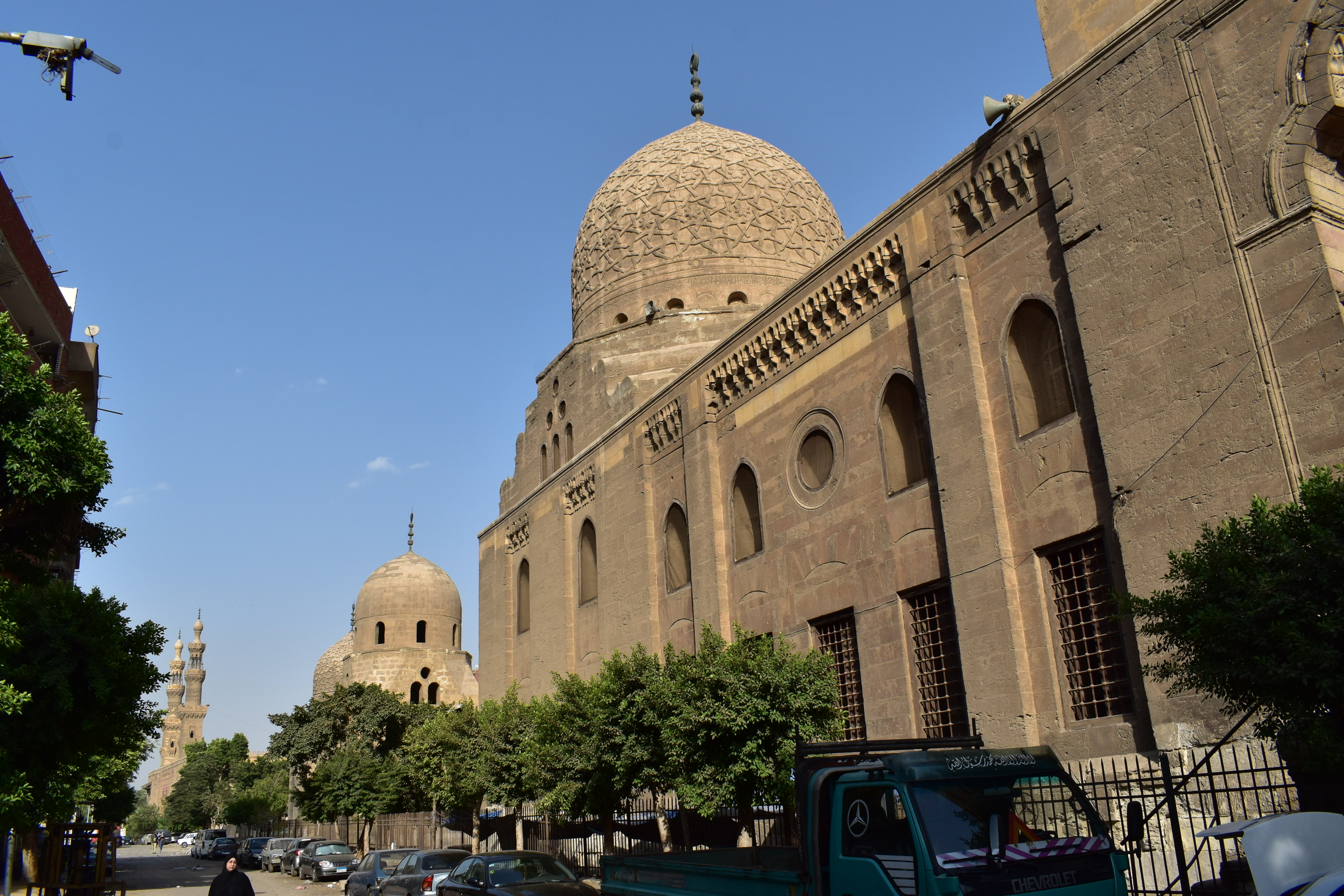
Barsbay's mausoleum complex in Cairo, completed in 1432. The carved dome (center) covers his tomb.

Before Shaykh died in 1421, he attempted to offset the power of the Circassians by importing Turkic mamluks and installing a Turk as atabeg al-asakir to serve as regent for his infant son Ahmad. After his death, a Circassian emir, Tatar, married Shaykh's widow, ousted the atabeg al-asakir and assumed power. Tatar died three months into his reign and was succeeded by Barsbay, another Circassian emir of Barquq, in 1422. Under Barsbay, the Mamluk Sultanate reached its greatest territorial extent and was militarily dominant throughout the region, but his legacy was mixed in the eyes of contemporary commentators who criticized his fiscal methods and economic policies.

Barsbay pursued an economic policy of establishing state monopolies over the lucrative trade with Europe, particularly spices, at the expense of local merchants. European merchants were forced to buy spices from state agents who set prices that maximized revenue rather than promoting competition. This monopoly set a precedent for his successors, some of whom established monopolies over other goods such as sugar and textiles. Barsbay compelled Red Sea traders to offload their goods at the Mamluk-held Hejazi port of Jeddah rather than the Yemeni port of Aden to derive the greatest financial gain from the Red Sea transit route to Europe. Barsbay's efforts at monopolization and trade protection were meant to offset the severe financial losses of the agricultural sector due to the frequent recurring plagues that took a heavy toll on the farmers. In the long term, the monopoly over the spice trade had a negative effect on Egyptian commerce and became a motivation for European merchants to seek alternative routes to the east around Africa and across the Atlantic.

Barsbay undertook efforts protect the caravan routes to the Hejaz from Bedouin raids. He reduced the independence of the Sharifs of Mecca to a minimum, sent troops to occupy the Hejaz and rein in the Bedouin, and took direct control of much of the region's administration. He aimed to secure the Egyptian Mediterranean coast from Catalan and Genoese piracy. Related to this, he launched campaigns against Cyprus in 1425–1426, during which the island's Lusignan king, Janus, was taken captive, because of his alleged assistance to the pirates; the large ransoms paid to the Mamluks by the Cypriots allowed them to mint new gold coinage for the first time since the 14th century. Janus became Barsbay's vassal, an arrangement enforced on his successors for several decades after.

In response to Aq Qoyonlu raids against the Jazira, the Mamluks launched expeditions against them, sacking Edessa and massacring its Muslim inhabitants in 1429 and attacking their capital Amid in 1433. The Aq Qoyonlu consequently recognized Mamluk suzerainty. While the Mamluks succeeded in forcing the Anatolian beyliks to largely submit to their suzerainty, Mamluk authority in Upper Egypt was mostly relegated to the emirs of the Hawwara tribe. The latter had grown wealthy from their burgeoning trade with central Africa and achieved a degree of local popularity due to their piety, education and generally benign treatment of the inhabitants.

==== Successors of Barsbay ====
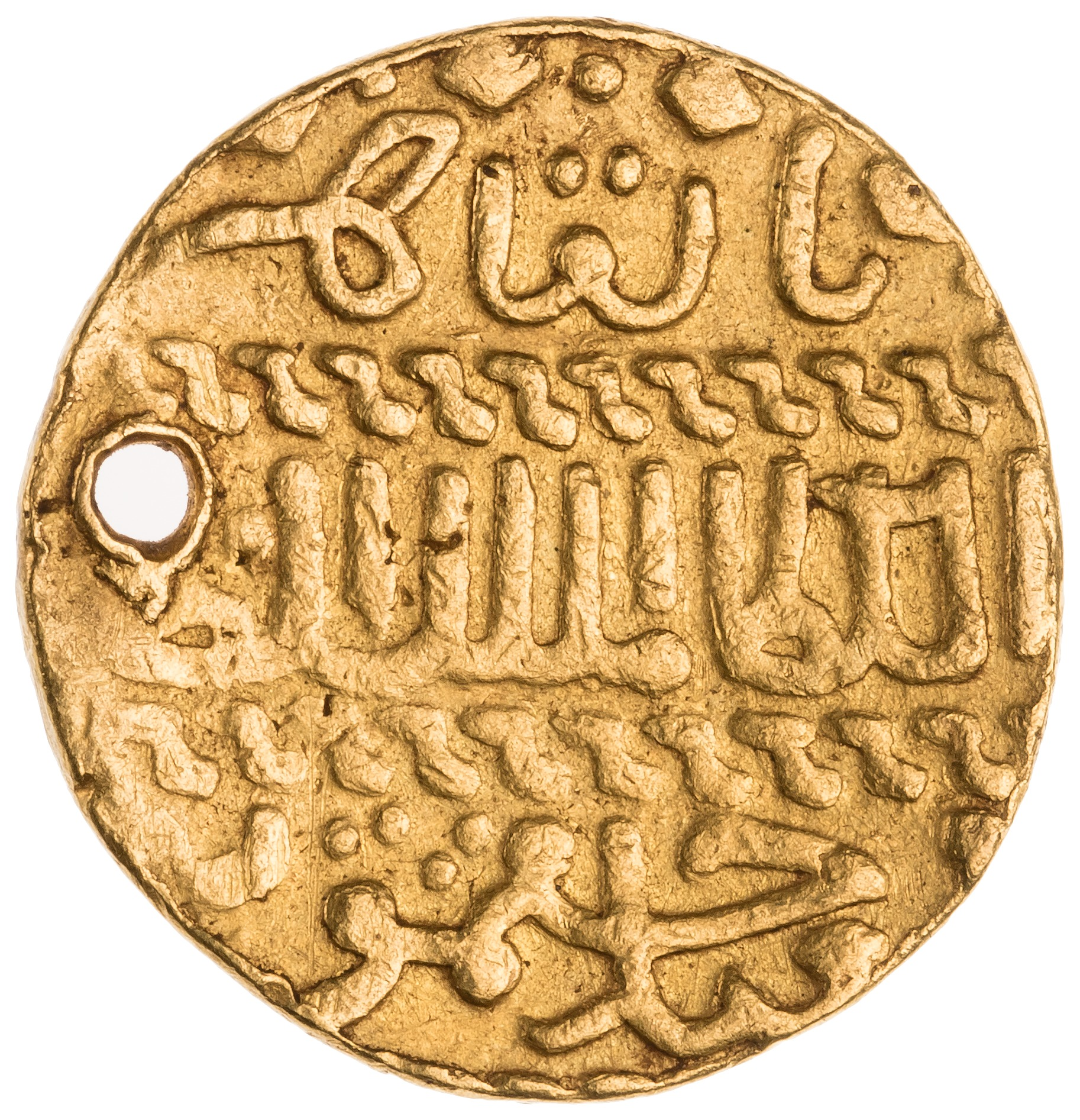
Gold dinar of Mamluk sultan Sayf ad-Din Jaqmaq minted in Cairo between 1438 and 1440

Barsbay died on 7 June 1438 and, per his wishes, was succeeded by his fourteen-year-old son, al-Aziz Yusuf, with a leading emir of Barsbay, Sayf al-Din Jaqmaq, appointed regent. The usual disputes over succession ensued and after three months Jaqmaq won and became sultan, exiling Yusuf to Alexandria. Jaqmaq maintained friendly relations with the Ottomans. His most important foreign military effort was an abortive campaign to conquer Rhodes from the Knights of St. John, involving three expeditions between 1440 and 1444. Domestically, Jaqmaq largely continued Barsbay's monopolies, though he promised to enact reforms and formally rescinded some tariffs. Jaqmaq died in February 1453. His eighteen-year-old son, al-Mansur Uthman, was installed on the throne but soon lost all support when he tried to buy the loyalty of other mamluks with debased coins.

Sayf al-Din Inal, who Barsbay had made his atabeg al-asakir, won enough support to be declared sultan two months after Jaqmaq's death. He ruled when Mehmed II, the Ottoman sultan, conquered Constantinople in 1453 and ordered public celebrations to commemorate the event, much like the celebrations of a Mamluk victory. It is unclear whether Inal and the Mamluks understood the implications of this event. It marked the rise of the Ottomans as a superpower, a status that brought them into increasing conflict with the evermore stagnant Mamluk Sultanate. By then, the state was under severe financial stress and was selling off iqta'at, depriving the treasury of their tax revenues. Coins based on precious metals nearly disappeared from circulation.

Inal died on 26 February 1461. His son, al-Mu'ayyad Ahmad, ruled for a short stint under challenges from the governors of Damascus and Jeddah. A compromise candidate, the Greek Khushqadam al-Mu'ayyadi, was then chosen and eventually neutralized his opposition. His reign was marked by further political difficulties abroad and domestically. Cyprus remained a vassal, but Khushqadam's representative was killed in battle after insulting James II (who had been installed by Inal). At home, Bedouin tribes caused unrest and the sultan's attempts to suppress the Labid tribe in the Nile Delta and against the Hawwara in Upper Egypt had little effect.

==== Reign of Qaitbay ====
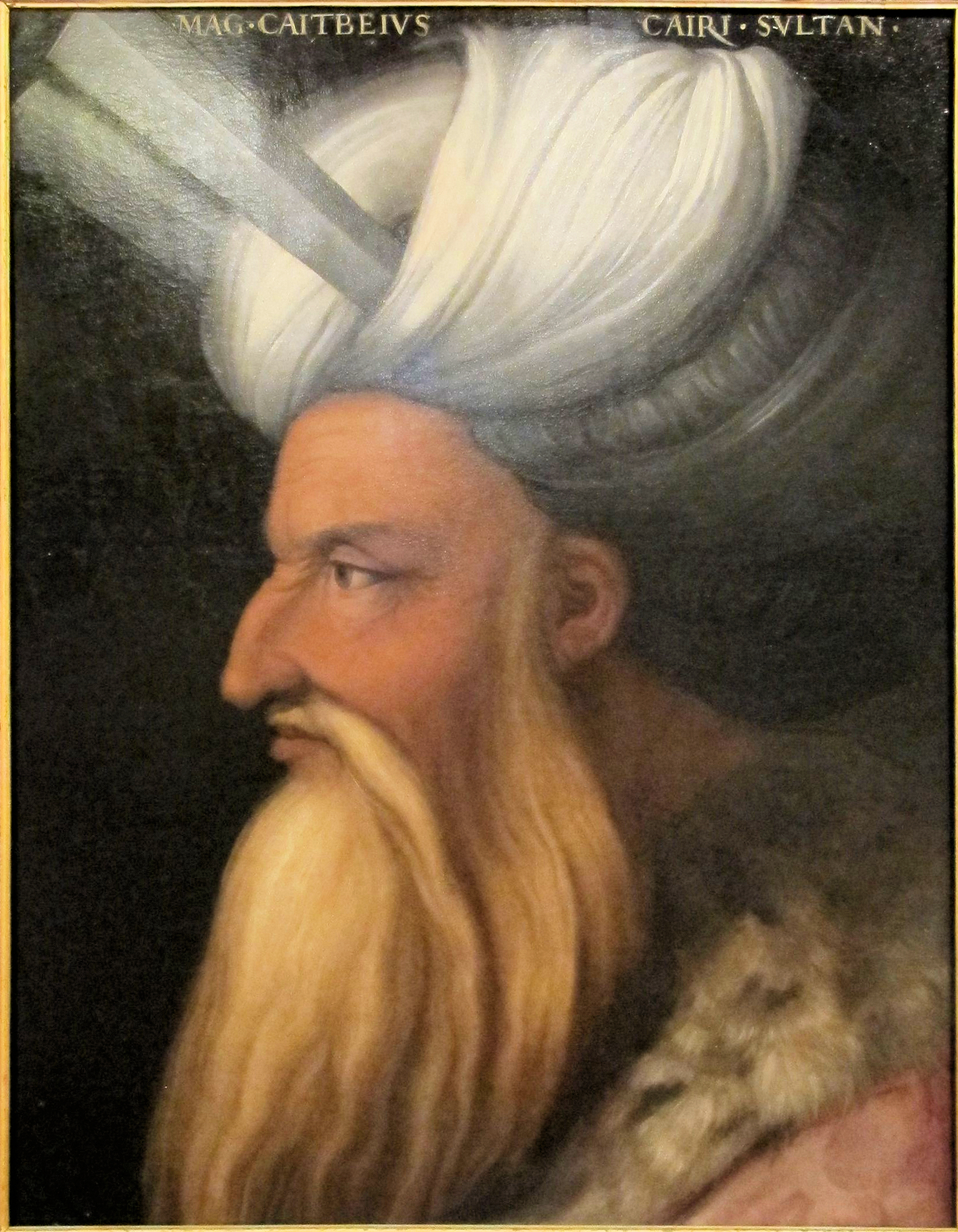
Mamluk Sultan Qaitbay (r.1468-1496, here "Mag Caitbeivs Cairi Svltan", "The great Caitbeius, Sultan of Cairo") by Florentine painter Cristofano dell'Altissimo (16th century), Galleria degli Uffizi.

Khushqadam died on 9 October 1467 and the mamluk emirs initially installed Yalbay al-Mu'ayyadi as his successor. After two months he was replaced by Timurbugha al-Zahiri. Timurbugha was deposed in turn on 31 January 1468, but voluntarily consented to the accession of his second in command, Qaitbay. Qaitbay's 28-year-long reign, the second longest in Mamluk history after al-Nasir Muhammad, was marked by relative stability and prosperity. Historical sources present a sultan whose character was markedly different from other Mamluk rulers. Notably, he disliked engaging in conspiracy, even though this had been a hallmark of Mamluk politics. He had a reputation for being even-handed and treating his colleagues and subordinates fairly, exemplified by his magnanimous treatment of the deposed Timurbugha. These traits seem to have kept internal tensions and conspiracies at bay throughout his reign. While the Mamluk practices of confiscation, extortion, and bribery continued in fiscal matters, under Qaitbay they were practiced in a more systematic way that allowed individuals and institutions to function within a more predictable environment. His engagement with the civil bureaucracy and the ulema (Islamic jurists and scholars) appeared to reflect a genuine commitment to Sunni Islamic law. He was one of the most prolific Mamluk patrons of architecture, second only to al-Nasir Muhammad, and his patronage of religious and civic buildings extended to the provinces beyond Cairo. Nonetheless, Qaitbay operated in an environment of recurring plague epidemics that underpinned a general population decline. Agriculture suffered, the treasury was often stretched thin, and by the end of his reign the economy was still weak.

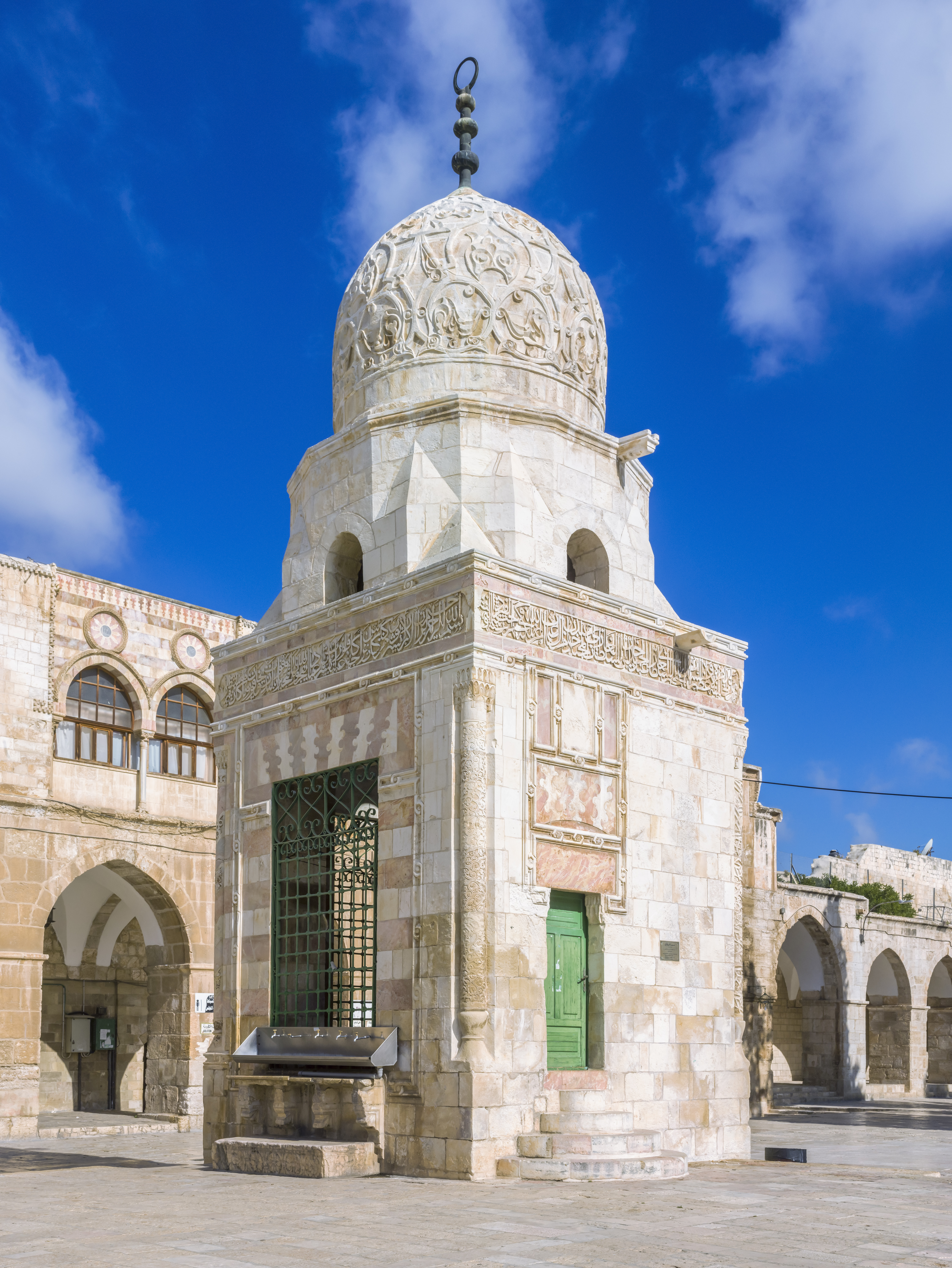
Sabil of Qaitbay at al-Aqsa in Jerusalem (1482)

The challenges to Mamluk dominance abroad were also mounting, particularly in Anatolia, where the Ottomans backed the Dulkadirids under Shah Suwar and Qaitbay supported the Karamanid principality under Ahmad. Shah Suwar was defeated in 1471 by a Mamluk expedition led by Qaitbay's top field commander, Yashbak min Mahdi. Qaitbay later had Shah Suwar executed and replaced by Shah Budaq as a Mamluk vassal and the Ottoman-Mamluk rivalry over the Dulkadirid throne continued. Qaitbay was afterward challenged by the Aq Qoyunlu, who launched an expedition into Mamluk territory around Aleppo in 1472, but were routed by Yashbak. Yashbak was killed the next year assisting an Aq Qoyunlu expedition against the Ottomans, depriving Qaitbay of his most important field commander.

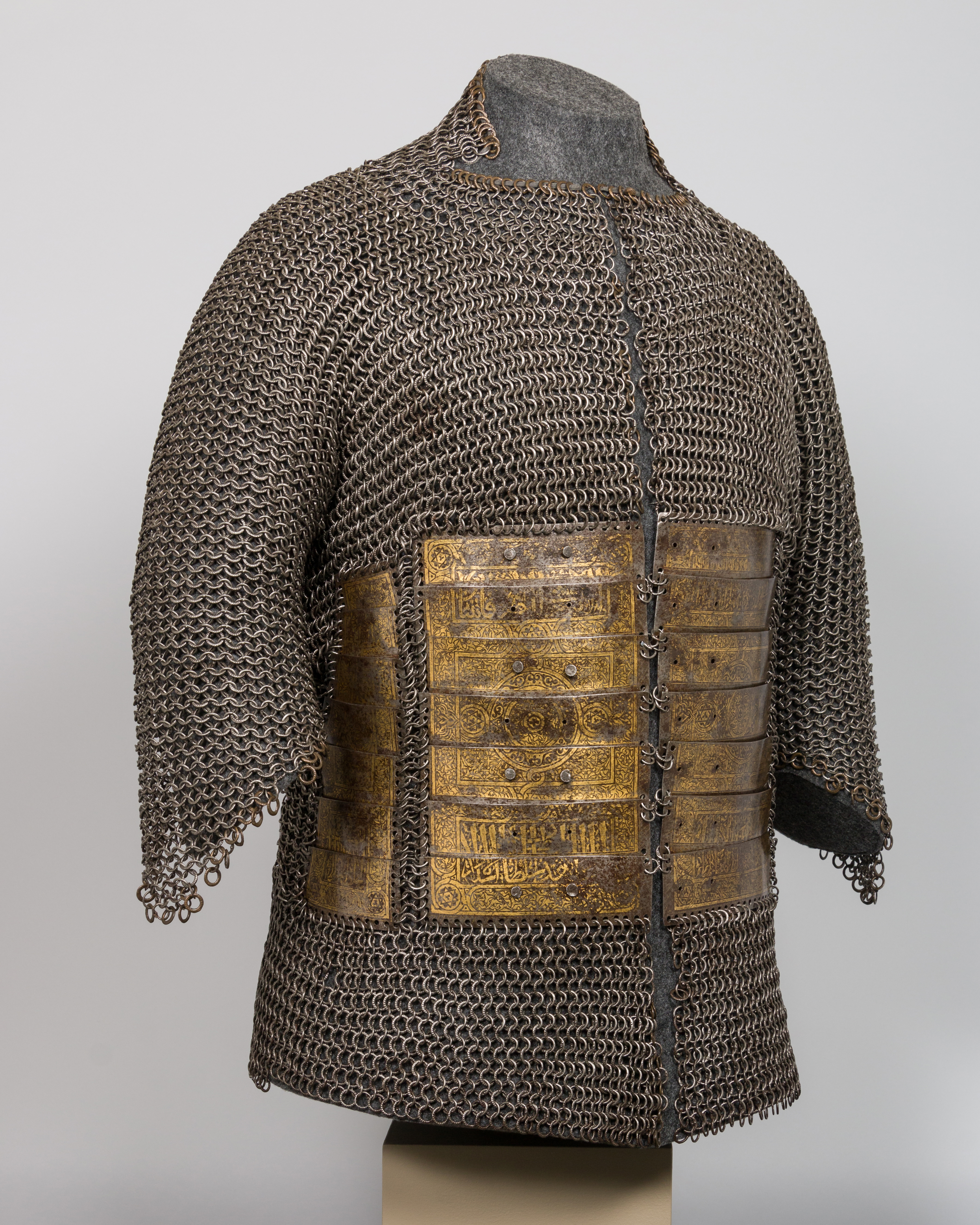
A shirt of mail and plate armor belonging to Sultan Qaitbay, one of the few surviving sets of armor from the Mamluk period.

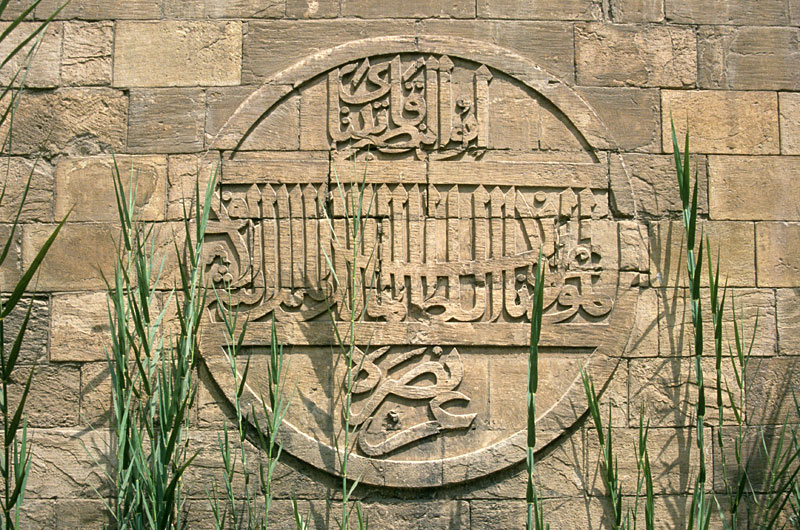
The emblem (Rank) of Qaitbay as seen on the Qantara (bridge) of al-Zahir Baybars in Qalyubiyya, Egypt. Emblems (Ranks) were employed on buildings, glass, wood, pottery, metalwork, coins, and textiles.

In 1489, the Republic of Venice annexed Cyprus. The Venetians promised Qaitbay their occupation would benefit him as well, as their large fleet could better keep the peace in the eastern Mediterranean than the Cypriots. Venice also agreed to continue the Cypriots' yearly tribute of 8,000 ducats to Cairo. A treaty signed between the two powers in 1490 formalized this arrangement. It signaled the Mamluks were now depending partly on the Venetians for naval security.

With the death of Mehmed II in 1481 and the accession of his son, Bayezid II, to the Ottoman throne, Ottoman-Mamluk tensions escalated. Bayezid's claim to the throne was challenged by his brother, Jem. To The latter was granted sanctuary by Qaitbay in Cairo in September 1481, infuriating Bayezid. Qaitbay also supported the Dulkadirid leader, Ala al-Dawla (who had replaced Shah Budaq), against the Ottomans, but Ala al-Dawla was compelled to shift his loyalty to Bayezid c. 1483 or 1484, which soon triggered the start of an Ottoman–Mamluk war over the next six years. By 1491, both sides were exhausted and an Ottoman embassy arrived in Cairo in the spring. An agreement was concluded and the status quo ante bellum was reaffirmed. During the rest of Qaitbay's reign, no further external conflicts took place.

==== Reign of al-Ghuri ====
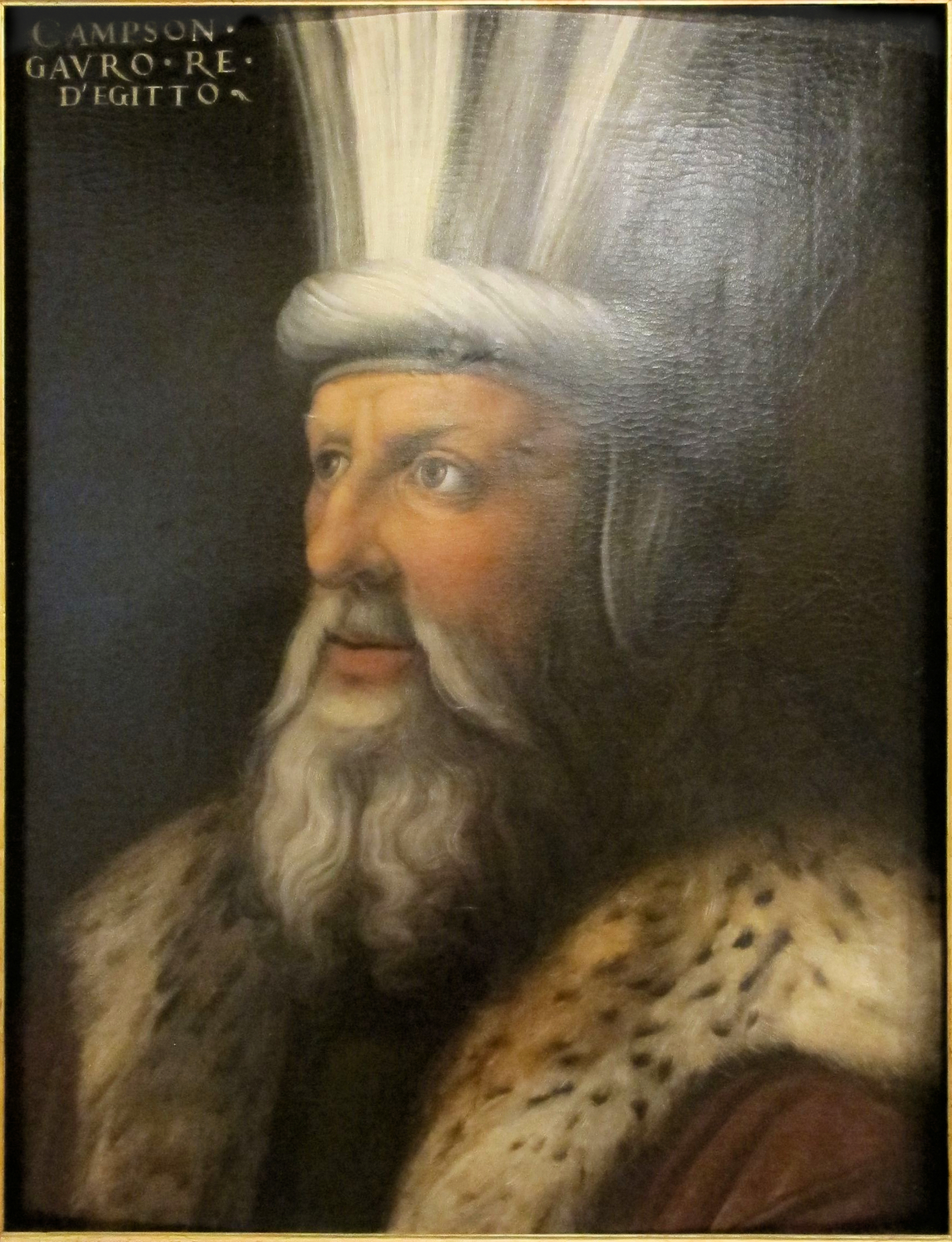
Mamluk Sultan Qansuh al-Ghuri (r. 1501–1516, here "Campson Gavro re d'Egitto", "Campson Gauro, king of Egypt") by Florentine painter Cristofano dell'Altissimo, Galleria degli Uffizi.

Qaitbay's death on 8 August 1496 inaugurated several years of instability. Eventually, following several brief reigns by other candidates, Qansuh al-Ghuri (or al-Ghawri) was placed on the throne in 1501. Al-Ghuri secured his position over several months and appointed new figures to key posts. His nephew, Tuman Bay was appointed dawadar and his second in command. In Syria, al-Ghuri appointed Sibay, a former rival who opposed him in 1504–1505, as governor of Damascus in 1506. The latter remained a major figure during his reign but he acknowledged Cairo's suzerainty and helped to keep the peace.

Al-Ghuri is often viewed negatively by historical commentators, particularly Ibn Iyas, for his draconic fiscal policies. He inherited a state beset by financial problems. In addition to the demographic and economic changes under his predecessors, changes in the organisation of the Mamluk military over time had also resulted in large numbers of soldiers feeling alienated and repeatedly threatening to revolt unless given extra payments, which drained the state's finances. To address the shortfalls, al-Ghuri resorted to heavy-handed and far-reaching taxation and extortion to refill the treasury, which elicited protests that were sometimes violent. He used the raised funds to repair fortresses throughout the region, to commission his own construction projects in Cairo, and to purchase a large number of new mamluks to fill his military ranks.

Al-Ghuri also attempted reforms of the Mamluk military. He recognized the impact of gunpowder technology used by the Ottomans and Europeans, but which the Mamluks had eschewed. In 1507, he established a foundry to produce cannons and created a new regiment trained to use them, known as the 'Fifth Corps' (al-Ṭabaqa al-Khamisa). The latter's ranks were filled by recruits from outside the traditional mamluk system, including Turkmens, Persians, awlad al-nas, and craftsmen. The traditional mamluk army, however, regarded firearms with contempt and vigorously resisted their incorporation into Mamluk warfare, which prevented al-Ghuri from making effective use of them until the end of his reign.

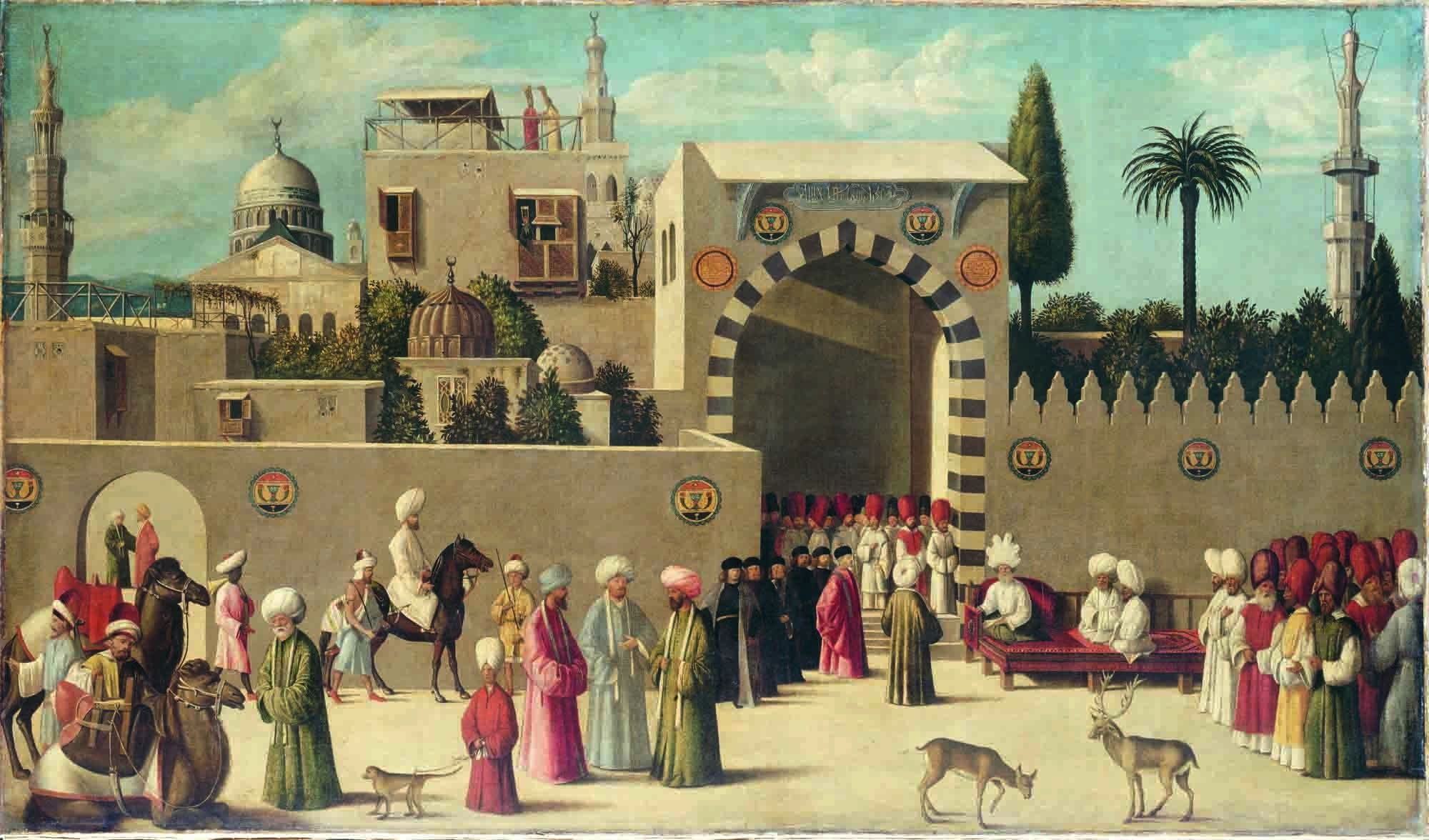
Anonymous 1511 painting depicting a reception of Venetian ambassadors in Damascus during the time of al-Ghuri

In the meantime, Shah Ismail I had emerged in 1501 and forged the Safavid Empire in Iran. The Safavids styled themselves as champions of Twelver Shi'ism, in direct opposition to the Sunnism of the Mamluks and Ottomans. Tensions along this frontier encouraged al-Ghuri to rely more on the Ottomans for aid, a policy that the Venetians ultimately also urged him to follow in order to counter their common foe, the Portuguese.

The latter's expansion into the Indian Ocean was one of the major concerns of al-Ghuri's time. In 1498, the Portuguese navigator Vasco da Gama had circumnavigated Africa and reached India, thus opening a new route for European trade with the east which bypassed the Middle East. This posed a serious threat to Muslim commerce, which was dominant in the area, as well as to the prosperity of Venice, which relied on trade passing from the Indian Ocean to the Mediterranean through Mamluk lands. For over more than a decade, a series of confrontations took place between Portuguese forces in the Indian Ocean and Muslim expeditions sent against them. A Mamluk fleet of fifty ships left from Jeddah in 1506, with assistance of forces from the Gujarat Sultanate. It defeated the Portuguese in 1507 but lost at the Battle of Diu in 1509. In 1515, a joint Ottoman-Mamluk fleet set out under the leadership of Salman Ra'is, but ultimately it did not accomplish much.

==== Fall to the Ottomans ====
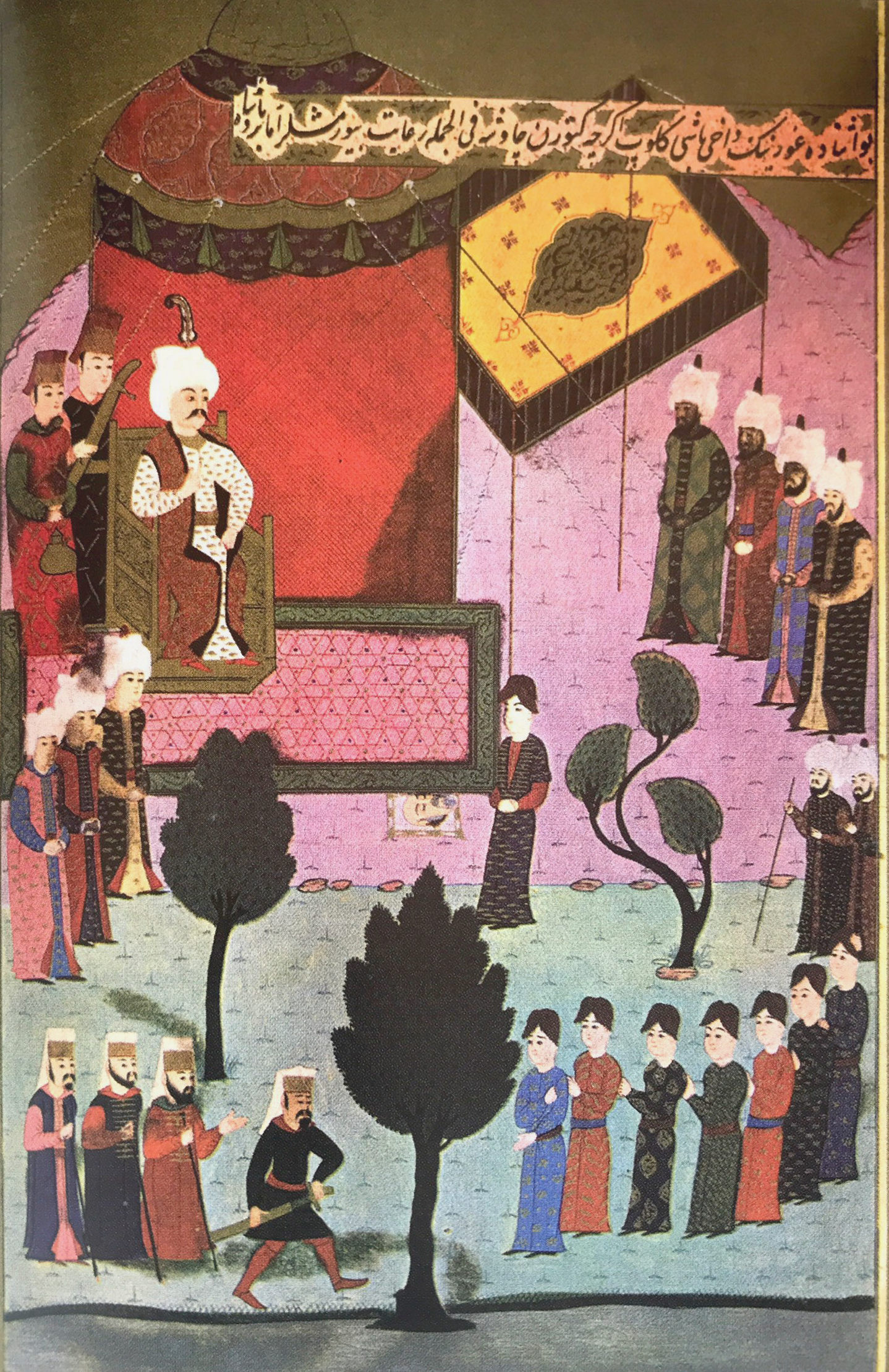
Ottoman painting showing the head of Mamluk Sultan al-Ghuri being remitted to Selim I

Selim I, the new Ottoman sultan, defeated the Safavids decisively at the Battle of Chaldiran in 1514. Soon after, he attacked and defeated the Dulkadirids, a Mamluk vassal, for refusing to aid him against the Safavids. Secure now against Ismail I, in 1516 he drew together a great army aiming at conquering Egypt, but to obscure the fact he presented the mobilisation of his army as being part of the war against Ismail I. The war started in 1516 which led to the later incorporation of Egypt and its dependencies in the Ottoman Empire, with Mamluk cavalry proving no match for the Ottoman artillery and the janissaries. On 24 August 1516, at the Battle of Marj Dabiq, the Ottomans were victorious against an army led by al-Ghuri himself. Khayr Bak, the governor of Aleppo, had secretly conspired with Selim and betrayed al-Ghuri, leaving with his troops part-way during the battle. In the subsequent chaos, al-Ghuri was killed. The surviving Mamluk forces returned to Aleppo but were denied entry to the city and marched back to Egypt, harassed along the way. Syria passed into Ottoman possession, and the Ottomans were welcomed in many places as deliverance from the Mamluks.

The Mamluk Sultanate survived a little longer until 1517. Tuman Bay, whom al-Ghuri had left as deputy in Cairo, was hastily and unanimously proclaimed sultan on 10 October 1516. The emirs rejected his plan to confront the next Ottoman advance at Gaza, so instead he prepared a final defense at al-Raydaniyya to the north of Cairo. In the early days of 1517, Tuman Bay received news that a Mamluk army was defeated at Gaza. The Ottoman attack at al-Raydaniyya overwhelmed the defenders on 22 January 1517 and reached Cairo. Over the following days, furious fighting continued between Mamluks, locals, and Ottomans, resulting in much damage to the city and three days of pillaging. Selim proclaimed an amnesty on 31 January, at which point many of the remaining Mamluks surrendered. Tuman Bay fled to Bahnasa in Middle Egypt with some of his remaining forces.

Selim initially offered the Mamluk sultan peace as an Ottoman vassal, but his messengers were intercepted and killed by mamluks. Tuman Bay, with 4,000 cavalry and some 8,000 infantry, confronted the Ottomans in a final bloody battle near Giza on 2 April 1517, where he was defeated and captured. Selim intended to spare him, but Khayr Bak and Janbirdi al-Ghazali, another former Mamluk commander, persuaded the Ottoman sultan that Tuman Bay was too dangerous to keep alive. Accordingly, the last Mamluk sultan was executed by hanging at Bab Zuwayla, one of Cairo's gates, on 13 April 1517. In reward for his betrayal at Marj Dabiq, Selim installed Khayr Bak as Ottoman governor of Egypt. Janbirdi was appointed governor of Damascus.

=== Mamluks under Ottoman rule ===
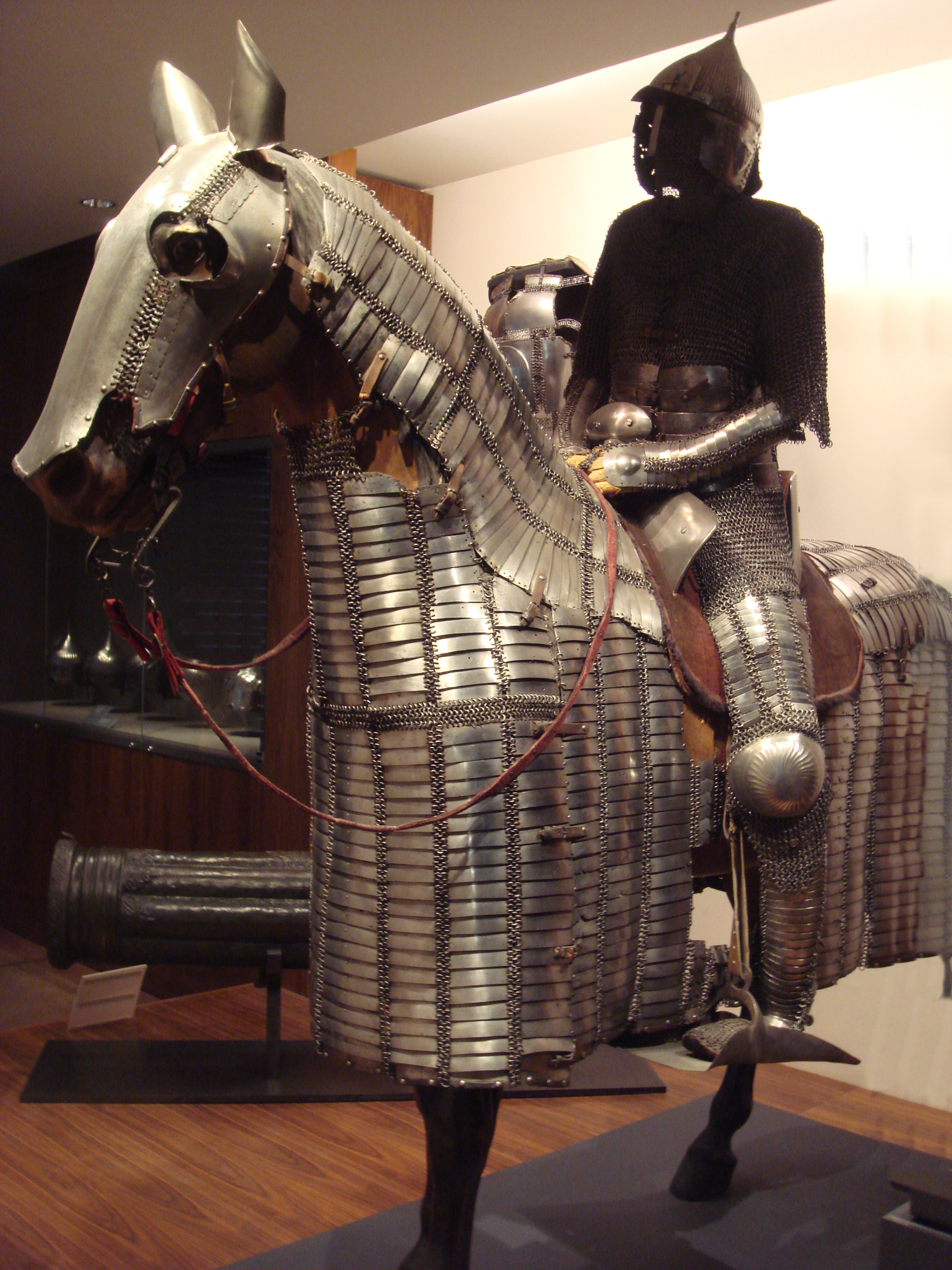
Armour of a Mamluk horseman from the Ottoman period, c. 1550.

While the Mamluk Sultanate ceased to exist with the Ottoman conquest and the recruitment of Royal Mamluks ended, the mamluks as a military-social class survived. They constituted a "self-perpetuating, largely Turkic-speaking warrior class" that continued to influence politics under Ottoman rule. They existed as military units in parallel with the more strictly Ottoman regiments like the janissaries and the azabs. The difference between these Ottoman regiments and the Egyptian mamluk regiments became blurred over time as intermarriage became common, resulting in a more mixed social class.

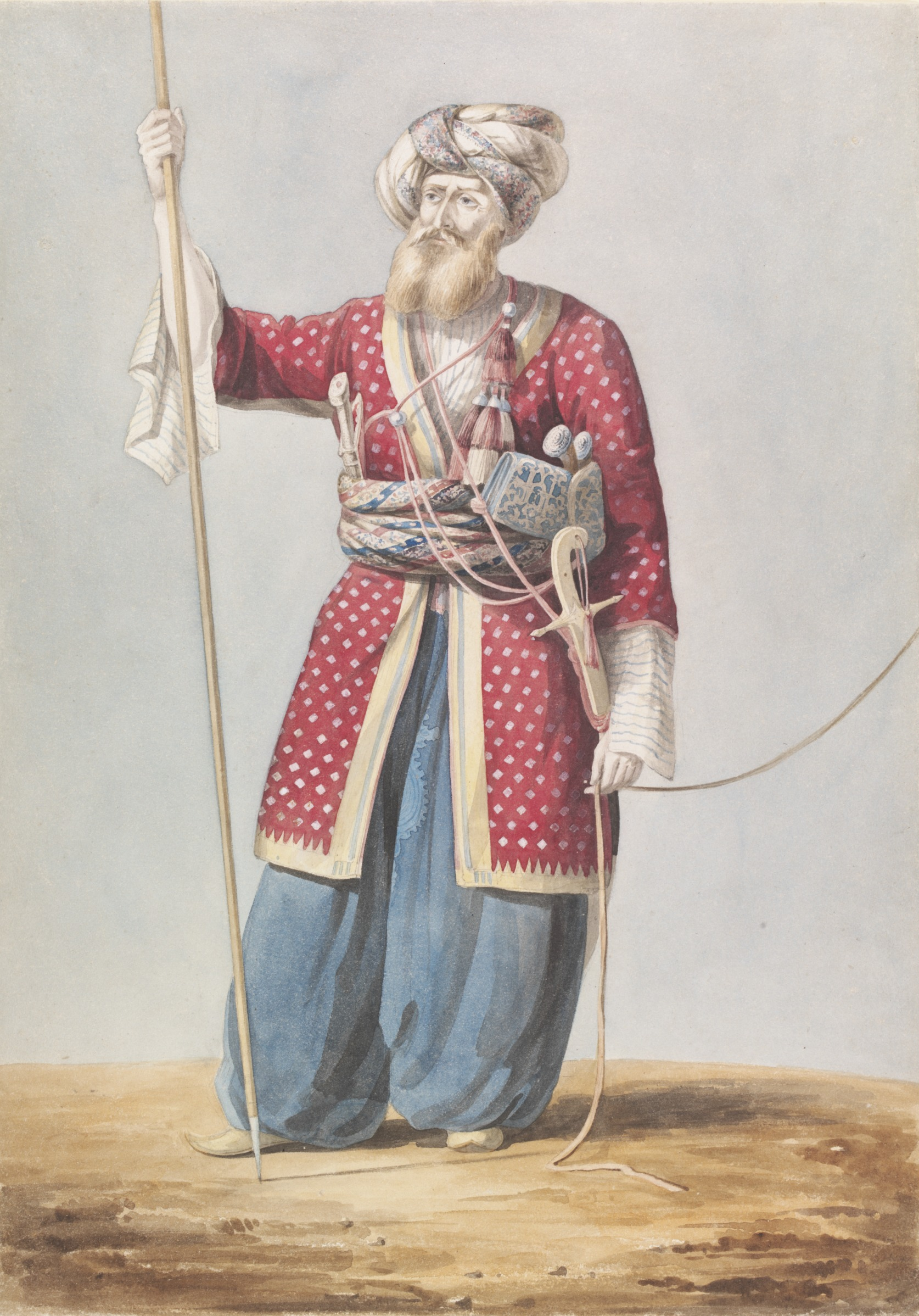
One of the last Mamluks, painted by William Page in 1816–1824

During this period, a number of mamluk 'households' formed, with a complex composition including both true mamluks and awlad al-nas, who could also rise to high ranks. Each household was headed by an ustadh, who could be an Ottoman officer or a local civilian. Their patronage extended to include retainers recruited from other Ottoman provinces as well as allies among the local urban population and tribes. Up to the early 17th century, the vast majority of Egyptian mamluks were still of Caucasian or Circassian origin. In the later 17th and 18th centuries, mamluks from other parts of the Ottoman Empire or its frontiers, such as Bosnia and Georgia, began to appear in Egypt.

Throughout the Ottoman period, powerful mamluk households and factions struggled for control of important political offices and of Egypt's revenues. Between 1688 and 1755, mamluk beys, allied with Bedouin and factions within the Ottoman garrison, deposed at least thirty-four governors. The mamluks remained a dominating force in Egyptian politics until their final elimination at the hands of Muhammad Ali following the Egyptian civil war in 1811.

== Society ==
=== Language ===
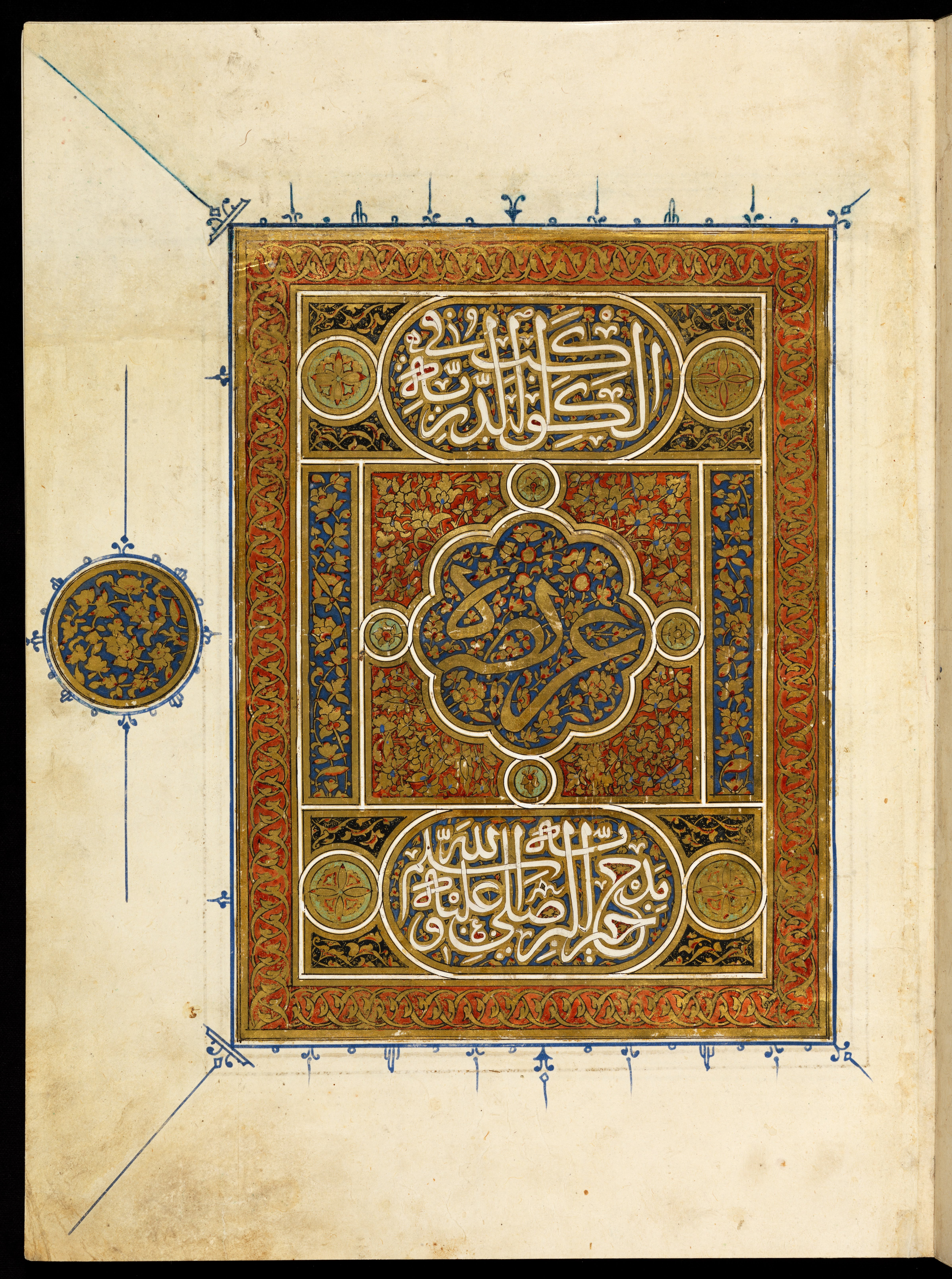
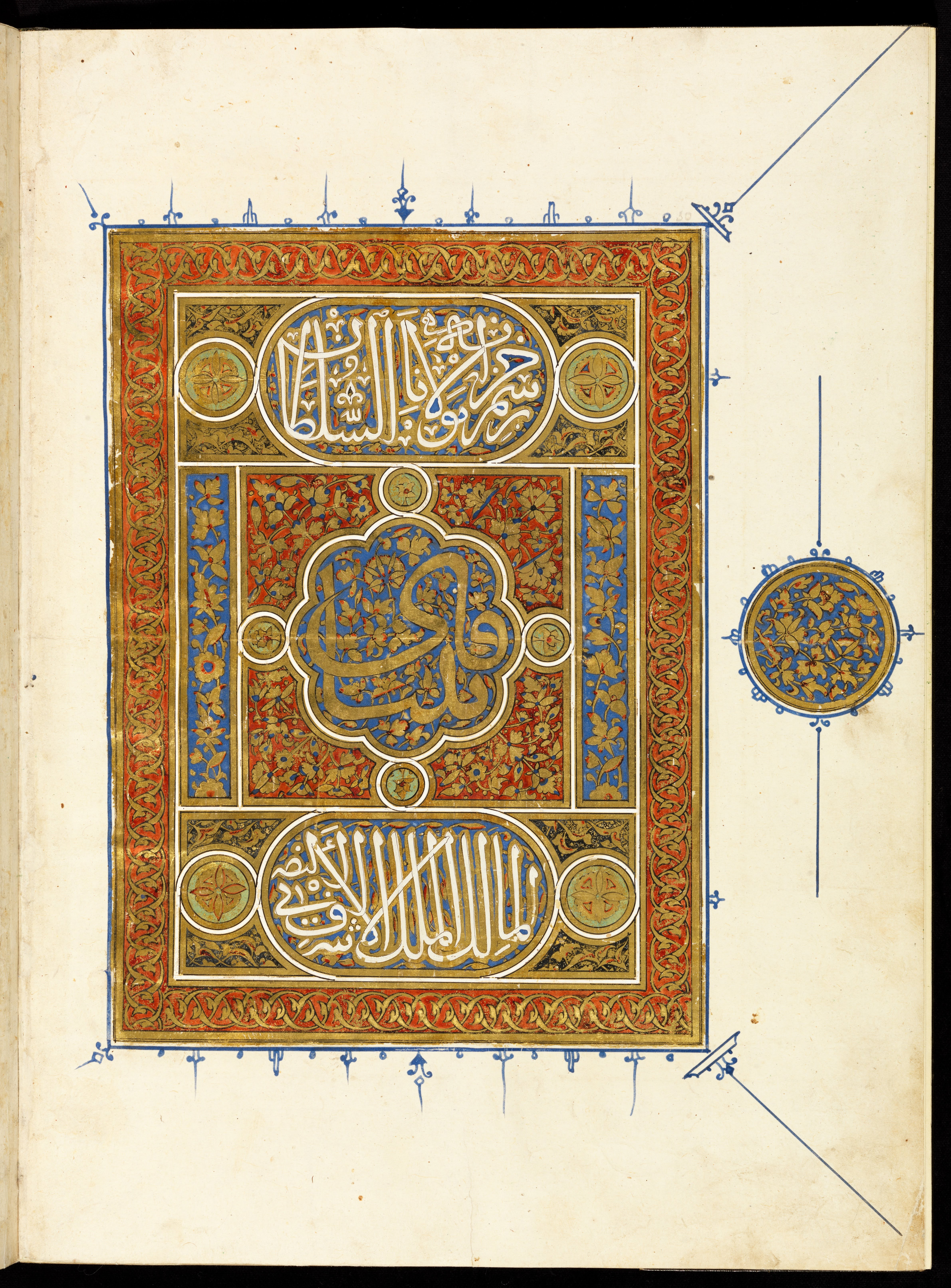
Illuminated frontispiece to the manuscript of Al-Kawākib ad-durriyya by Al-Busiri made for the sultan Qaitbay. Large lobed medallions in the center bear the name of the sultan (right) and blessing on him (left). Above and below on the right is the certificate of commissioning stating the manuscript to have been produced for his library, while opposite, on the facing page, the upper and lower panels contain the title of the work. Chester Beatty Library.

By the time the Mamluks took power, Arabic had already been established as the language of religion, culture and the bureaucracy in Egypt, and was widespread among non-Muslim communities there as well. Arabic's wide usage among Muslim and non-Muslim commoners had likely been motivated by their aspiration to learn the language of the ruling and scholarly elite. Another contributing factor was the wave of Arab tribal migration to Egypt and subsequent intermarriage between Arabs and the indigenous population. The Mamluks contributed to the expansion of Arabic in Egypt through their victory over the Mongols and the Crusaders and the subsequent creation of a Muslim haven in Egypt and Syria for Arabic-speaking immigrants from other conquered Muslim lands. The continuing invasions of Syria by Mongol armies led to further waves of Syrian immigrants, including scholars and artisans, to Egypt. The Mamluk administration used Arabic as the language of diplomacy, even when corresponding with non-Arabic-speaking rulers in Europe and elsewhere.

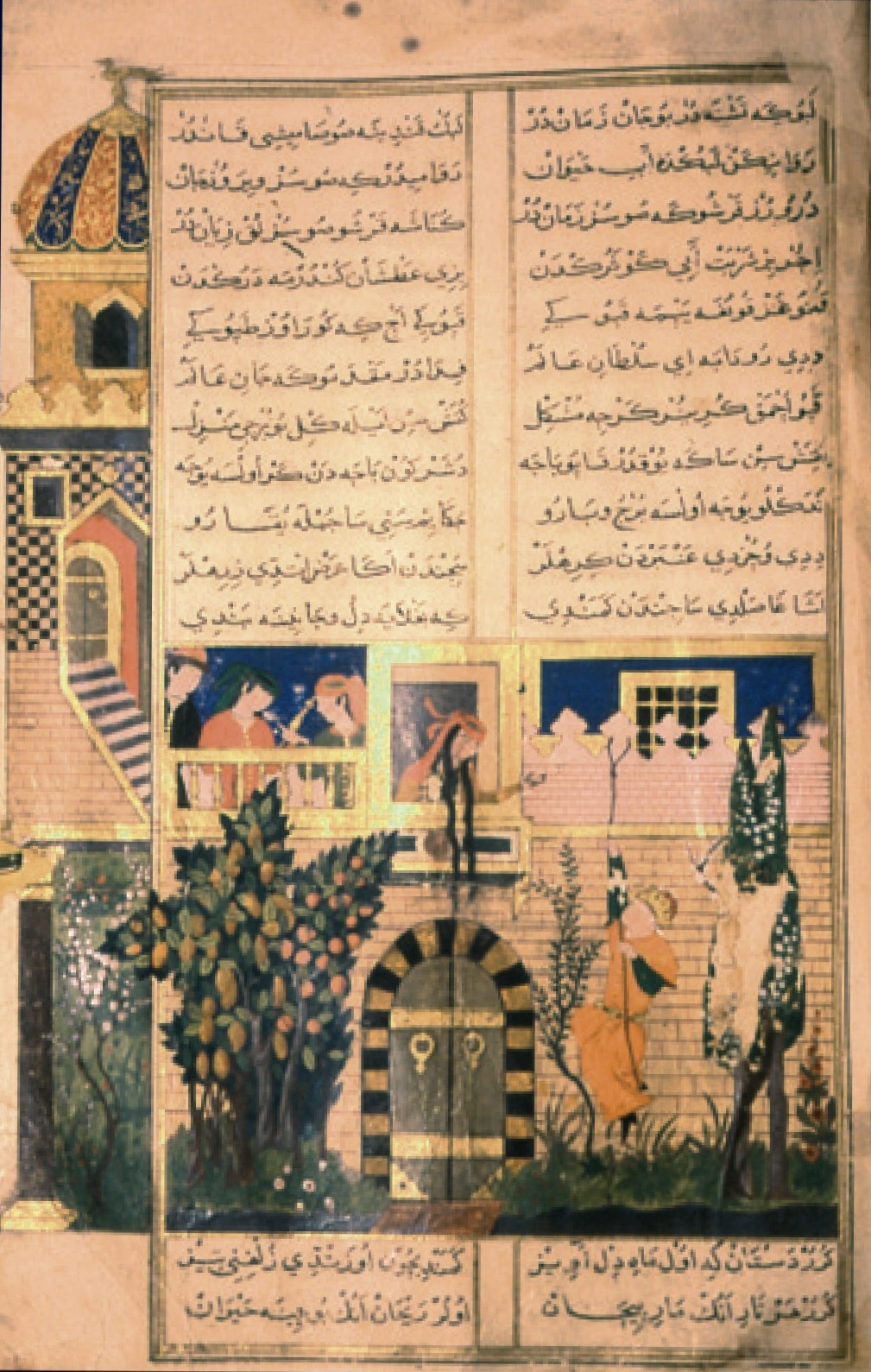
A manuscript of an Oghuz Turkic translation of Ferdowsi’s Shahnameh, dated 1510, created for the library of Qansuh al-Ghawri, translated and copied by Sharīf of Amid.

Although Arabic was used as the administrative language of the sultanate, a variety of Kipchak Turkic, namely the Mamluk-Kipchak language was the spoken language of the Mamluk ruling elite. According to Petry, "the Mamluks regarded Turkish as their caste's vehicle of communication, even though they themselves spoke Central Asian dialects such as Qipjak, or Circassian, a Caucasic language." According to historian Michael Winter, Turkicness was the distinctive aspect of the Mamluk ruling elite, for only they knew how to speak Turkic and had Turkic names, ethnicity served as a major factor separating the mostly Turkic or Turkicized Mamluk elite from their Arabic-speaking subjects. While according to historian Arthur Goldschmit this difference barely mattered to the local Egyptians since they both shared common religion (Sunni Islam) and cultural values, but occasionally the people revolted against rulers that taxed too heavily.

While the Mamluk elite was ethnically diverse, those who were not Turkic in origin were Turkicized nonetheless. As such, the ethnically Circassian Mamluks who gained prominence with the rise of the Burji regime and became the dominant ethnic element of the government, were educated in a Turkic language and were considered to be Turks by the Arabic-speaking population. Kipchak Turkic was also used in writing, but to a lesser extent than Arabic and mainly for a mamluk audience. Over time, it was replaced in this role by Oghuz Turkic due to the growing influence of Turkic Anatolia.

The ruling military elite of the sultanate was exclusive to those of mamluk background, with rare exceptions. Ethnic origin was a key component of an individual mamluk's identity, and ethnic identity manifested itself through given names, dress, access to administrative positions and was indicated by a sultan's nisba. The sons of mamluks, known as the awlad al-nas, did not typically hold positions in the military elite and instead, were often part of the civilian administration or the Muslim religious establishment. Among the Bahri sultans and emirs, there existed a degree of pride of their Kipchak Turkic roots, and their non-Kipchak usurpers such as sultans Kitbuqa, Baybars II and Lajin were often de-legitimized in the Bahri-era sources for their non-Kipchak origins. The Mamluk elites of the Burji period were also apparently proud of their Circassian origins.

=== Religion ===
==== Muslim community ====
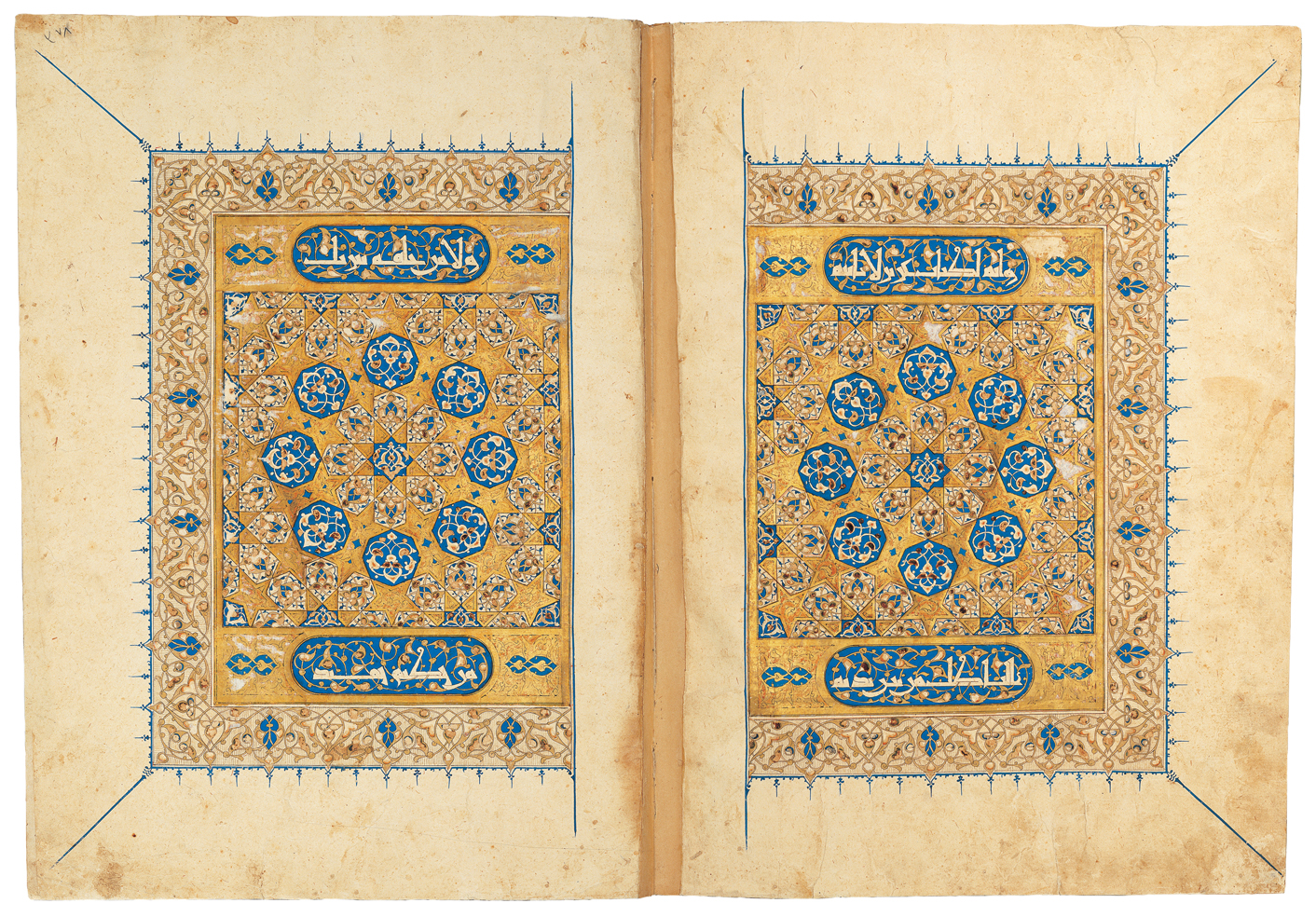
Finispiece from the Qur'an copied by Ahmad ibn Kamal al-Mutatabbib in 1334. This manuscript is part of the National Library of Egypt's Collection of Mamluk Qur'an Manuscripts inscribed in the UNESCO Memory of the World Register

A wide range of Islamic religious expression existed in Egypt during the early Mamluk era, namely Sunni Islam and its major madhabs (schools of jurisprudence) and different Sufi orders, but also small communities of Ismai'li Shia Muslims, particularly in Upper Egypt. There remained a significant minority of Coptic Christians. Under Saladin, the Ayyubids embarked on a program of reviving and strengthening Sunni Islam in Egypt to counter Christianity, which had been reviving under the religiously benign rule of the Fatimids, and Isma'ilism, the branch of Islam of the Fatimid state. Under the Bahri sultans, the promotion of Sunni Islam was pursued more vigorously than under the Ayyubids. The Mamluks were motivated by personal piety or political expediency for Islam was both an assimilating and unifying factor between the Mamluks and the majority of their subjects; the early mamluks had been brought up as Sunni Muslims and the Islamic faith was the only aspect of life shared between the Mamluk ruling elite and its subjects. While the precedent set by the Ayyubids highly influenced the Mamluk state's embrace of Sunni Islam, the circumstances in the Muslim Middle East in the aftermath of the Crusader and Mongol invasions also left Mamluk Egypt as the last major Islamic power able to confront the Crusaders and the Mongols. Thus, the early Mamluk embrace of Sunni Islam also stemmed from the pursuit of a moral unity within their realm based on the majority views of its subjects.

The Mamluks cultivated and utilized Muslim leaders to channel the religious feelings of their Muslim subjects in a manner that did not disrupt the sultanate's authority. Similar to their Ayyubid predecessors, the Bahri sultans favored the Shafi'i madhab, while additionally promoting the other major Sunni madhabs, namely the Maliki, Hanbali and Hanafi. Baybars ended the Ayyubid and early Mamluk tradition of selecting a Shafi'i scholar as qadi al-qudah (chief judge) and instead appointed a qadi al-qudah from each of the four madhabs. This policy was partly motivated to accommodate an increasingly diverse Muslim population whose components had immigrated to Egypt from regions where other madhabs prevailed. The diffusion of the post of qadi al-qudah enabled Mamluk sultans to patronize each madhab and gain more influence over them. Nevertheless, the Shafi'i scholars kept a number of privileges over their counterparts.

The Mamluks embraced the Sufi orders in the empire. Sufism was widespread in Egypt by the 13th century, and the Shadhiliyya was the most popular order. The Shadhiliyya lacked an institutional structure and was flexible in its religious thought, allowing it to easily adapt to its local environment. It incorporated Sunni Islamic piety with its basis in the Qur'an and hadith, Sufi mysticism, and elements of popular religion such as sainthood, ziyarat (visitation) to the tombs of saintly or religious individuals, and dhikr (invocation of God). Other Sufi orders with large numbers of adherents were the Rifa'iyya and Badawiyya. While the Mamluks patronized the Sunni ulema through appointments to government office, they patronized the Sufis by funding zawiyas (Sufi lodges). On the other end of the spectrum of Sunni religious expression were the teachings of the Hanbali scholar Ibn Taymiyya, which emphasized stringent moral rigor based on literal interpretations of the Qur'an and the Sunna, and a deep hostility to the aspects of mysticism and popular religious innovations promoted by the Sufis. While Ibn Taymiyya was not a typical representative of Sunni orthodoxy in the sultanate, he was the most prominent Muslim scholar of the Mamluk era and arrested several times by the Mamluks for his religious teachings, which are still influential in the modern Muslim world. Ibn Taymiyya's doctrines were regarded as heretical by the Sunni establishment patronized by the Mamluks.

==== Christian and Jewish communities ====
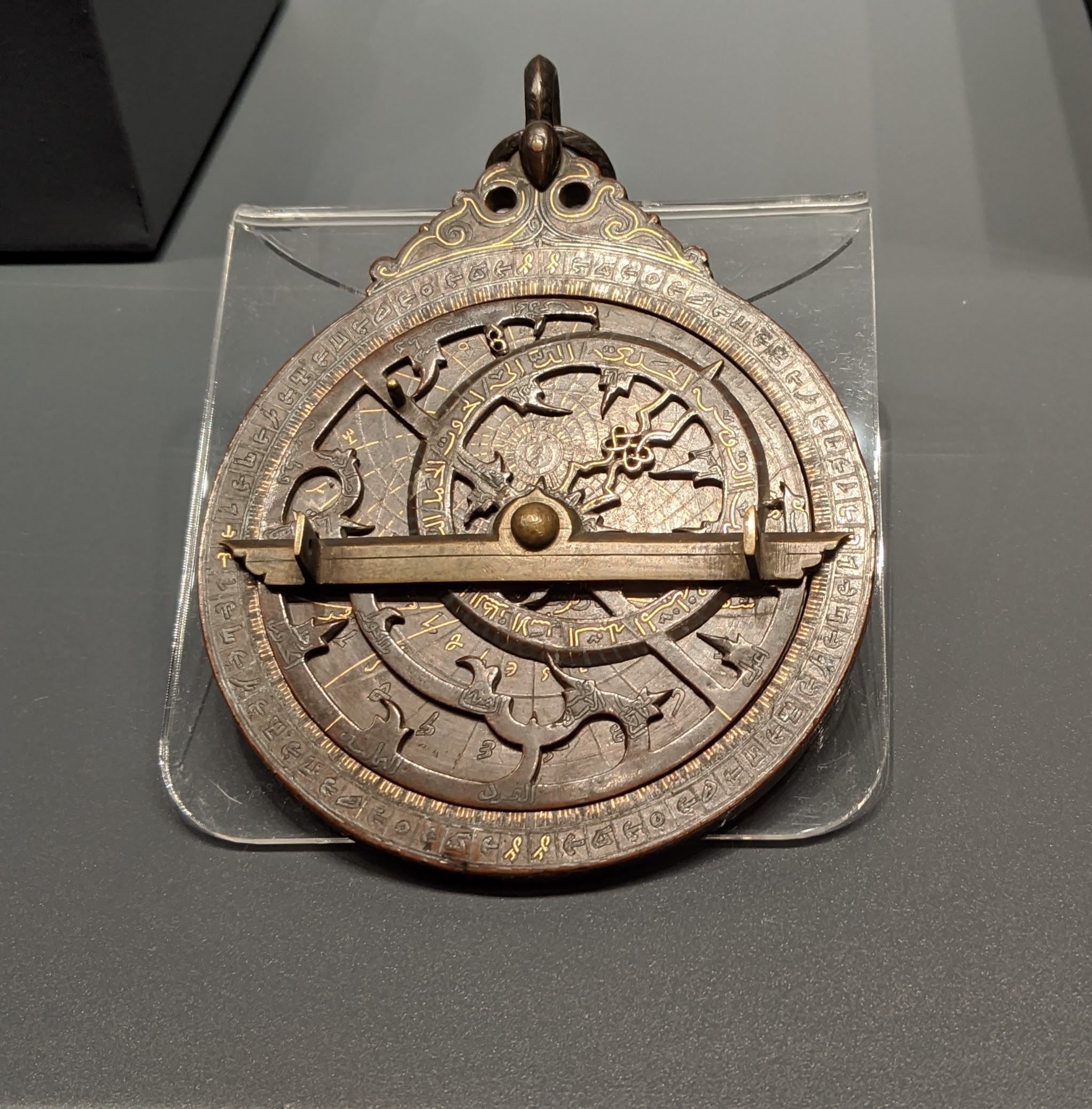
Mamluk-era astrolabe with Coptic numerals, dated 1282/1283. This astrolabe and other items of its kind are proof that Mamluks still used Coptic numerals and Coptic calendar for various practical and scientific purposes. Turkish and Islamic Arts Museum

Christians and Jews in the empire were governed by the dual authority of their respective religious institutions and the sultan. The authority of the former extended to many of the everyday aspects of Christian and Jewish life and was not restricted to the religious practices of the two communities. The Mamluk government, often under the official banner of the Pact of Umar which gave Christians and Jews dhimmi (protected peoples) status, determined the taxes paid by Christians and Jews, including the jizya (poll tax on non-Muslims), permission to construct houses of worship, and the public appearance of Christians and Jews. Jews generally fared better than Christians, and the latter experienced more difficulties under the Mamluks than their Muslim predecessors. The association of Christians with the Mongols, due to the latter's use of Armenian and Georgian Christian auxiliaries, the attempted alliance between the Mongols and the Crusader powers, and the massacres of Muslim communities and the sparing of Christians in cities captured by the Mongols, contributed to rising anti-Christian sentiments in the Mamluk era. The manifestations of anti-Christian hostility were mostly spearheaded at the popular level rather than by the Mamluk sultans. The main source of popular hostility was resentment at the privileged positions many Christians held in the Mamluk bureaucracy.

The Coptic decline in Egypt occurred under the Bahri sultans and accelerated further under the Burji regime. There were several instances of Egyptian Muslim protests against the wealth of Copts and their employment with the state, and both Muslim and Christian rioters burned down each other's houses of worship during intercommunal clashes. As a result of popular pressure, Copts had their employment in the bureaucracy terminated at least nine times between the late 13th and mid-15th centuries, and on one occasion, in 1301, the government ordered the closure of all churches. Coptic bureaucrats were often restored to their positions after tensions passed. Many Copts were forced to convert to Islam or at least adopted outward expressions of Muslim faith to protect their employment and avoid the jizya and official measures against them. A large wave of Coptic conversions to Islam occurred in the 14th century, as a result of persecution, destruction of churches, and to retain employment. By the end of the Mamluk period, the ratio of Muslims to Christians in Egypt may have risen to 10:1.

In Syria, the Mamluks uprooted the local Maronite and Greek Orthodox Christians from the coastal areas to prevent their contact with European powers. The Maronite Church was especially suspected by the Mamluks of collaboration with the Europeans due to the close relations between the Maronite Church and the papacy in Rome and the Christian European powers, particularly Cyprus. The Greek Orthodox Church declined after the Mamluk destruction of its spiritual center, Antioch, and the Timurid destruction of Aleppo and Damascus in 1400. The Syriac Christians also significant declined in Syria due to intra-communal disputes over patriarchal succession and the destruction of churches by the Timurids or local Kurdish tribes. The Mamluks inaugurated a similar decline of the Armenian Orthodox Church after their conquest of the Cilicia in 1374, in addition to the raids of the Timurids in 1386 and the conflict between the Timurids and the Aq Qoyunlu and Kara Qoyonlu tribal confederations in Cilicia.

=== Bedouin relationship with the state ===
Bedouins were a reserve force in the Mamluk military. During the third reign of al-Nasir Muhammad, the Bedouin tribes, particularly those of Syria, such as the Al Fadl, were strengthened and integrated into the economy. Bedouin tribes were also a major supplier of the Mamluk cavalry's Arabian horses. Qalawun purchased horses from the Bedouin of Barqa, which were inexpensive but of high quality, while al-Nasir Muhammad spent extravagantly for horses from Bedouins in Barqa, Syria, Iraq and Bahrayn (eastern Arabia).

Baybars and Qalawun, and the Syrian viceroys of al-Nasir Muhammad during his first two reigns, emirs Salar and Baybars II, were averse to granting Bedouin sheikhs iqtaʿat, and when they did, the iqtaʿat were of low quality. During al-Nasir Muhammad's third reign, the Al Fadl were granted high-quality iqtaʿat in abundance, strengthening the tribe to become the most powerful among the Bedouin of the Syrian Desert. Beyond his personal admiration of the Bedouin, al-Nasir Muhammad's distributed iqtaʿat to the Al Fadl to prevent their defection to the Ilkhanate, which the Al Fadl had frequently done during the early 14th century. Competition over iqtaʿat and the post of amir al-ʿarab (chief commander of the Bedouin) in Syria, led to conflict and rebellion among the tribes, leading to mass bloodshed in Syria in the aftermath of al-Nasir Muhammad's death. The Mamluk leadership in Syria, weakened by the losses of the Black Plague, was unable to quell the Bedouin through military expeditions, so they resolved to assassinate the chiefs of the tribes. The Al Fadl eventually lost favor, to the advantage of the Bedouin tribes around al-Karak under later Bahri sultans.

In Egypt, during al-Nasir Muhammad's third reign, the Mamluks had a similar relationship with the Bedouin. The Isa Ibn Hasan al-Hajjan tribe became powerful there after being assigned massive iqtaʿat. The tribe remained strong after al-Nasir Muhammad's death, but frequently rebelled against the succeeding Bahri sultans. They were restored after each rebellion, before the tribe's sheikh was finally executed in 1353. In Sharqiya in Lower Egypt, the Tha'laba tribes were entrusted to supervise the postal routes, but were often unreliable and joined the Al A'id tribe during their raids. Bedouin tribal wars frequently disrupted trade and travel in Upper Egypt, and destroyed cultivated lands and sugar processing plants. In the mid-14th century, the rival Arak and Banu Hilal tribes of Upper Egypt, became de facto rulers of the region, forcing the Mamluks to rely on them for tax collection. The Bedouin were purged from Upper and Lower Egypt by the campaigns of Shaykhu in 1353.

== Government ==
The Mamluks did not significantly alter the administrative, legal and economic systems they inherited from the Ayyubid state. The Mamluk ruled over essentially the same territory of the Ayyubid state, i.e. Egypt, Syria and the Hejaz. Unlike the collective sovereignty of the Ayyubids, where territory was divided among members of the royal family, the Mamluk state was unitary. Under many Ayyubid sultans, Egypt had paramountcy over the Syrian provinces, but under the Mamluks this paramountcy was consistent and absolute. Cairo remained the capital of the empire and its social, economic and administrative center, with the Citadel of Cairo serving as the sultan's headquarters.

=== Authority of the sultan ===
The Mamluk sultan was the supreme government authority, while he delegated power to provincial governors known as nuwwab al-saltana (deputy sultans, sing. na'ib al-saltana). The vice-regent of Egypt was the top na'ib, followed by the na'ib of Damascus, then Aleppo, then the nuwwab of al-Karak, Safed, Tripoli, Homs and Hama. In Hama, the Mamluks permitted the Ayyubids to continue governing until 1341 (its popular governor in 1320, Abu'l Fida, was granted the honorary title of sultan by al-Nasir Muhammad), but otherwise the nuwwab of the provinces were mamluk emirs.

A consistent accession process occurred with every new sultan. It mostly involved an election by a council of emirs and mamluks (who would proffer an oath of loyalty), the sultan's assumption of the regal title al-malik, a state-organized procession through Cairo led by the sultan, and the reading of the sultan's name in the khutba (Friday prayer sermon). The process was not formalized and the electoral body never defined, but typically consisted of the emirs and mamluks of whichever Mamluk faction held sway; usurpations of the throne by rival factions were relatively common. Despite the electoral nature of accession, dynastic succession was nonetheless a reality at times, especially during the Bahri period, where Baybars' sons Baraka and Solamish succeeded him, before Qalawun usurped the throne and was thereafter succeeded by four generations of direct descendants, with occasional interruptions. Hereditary rule was much less frequent under the Burji regime. Nonetheless, with rare exception, the Burji sultans were all linked to the regime's founder Barquq through blood or mamluk affiliation. The accession of blood relatives to the sultanate was often the result of the decision or indecision of leading Mamluk emirs or the will of the preceding sultan. The latter situation applied to the sultans Baybars, Qalawun, the latter's son, al-Nasir Muhammad and Barquq, who formally arranged for one or more of their sons to succeed them. More often than not, the sons of sultans were elected by the senior emirs with the intention that they serve as convenient figureheads presiding over an oligarchy of the emirs.

Lesser-ranked emirs viewed the sultan as a peer whom they entrusted with ultimate authority and as a benefactor whom they expected to guarantee their salaries and monopoly on the military. When emirs felt the sultan was not ensuring their benefits, disruptive riots, coup plots or delays to calls for service were all likely scenarios. Often, the practical restrictions on a sultan's power came from his own khushdashiyya, defined by historian Amalia Levanoni as "the fostering of a common bond between mamluks who belonged to the household of a single master and their loyalty towards him." The foundation of Mamluk organization and factional unity was based on the principles of khushdashiyya, which was a crucial component of a sultan's authority and power. The sultan also derived power from other emirs, with whom there was constant tension, particularly in peacetime. According to Holt, the factious nature of emirs who were not the sultan's khushdashiyya stemmed from their primary loyalty being to their ustadh. Emirs who were part of the sultan's khushdashiyya also rebelled at times, particularly the nuwwab of Syria who had power bases in their provinces. Typically, the faction most loyal to the sultan were the Royal Mamluks, particularly those whom the sultan had personally recruited and manumitted, as opposed to the qaranis, who were recruited by his predecessors. The qaranis occasionally constituted a hostile faction, such as with as-Salih Ayyub and the Qalawuni successors of al-Nasir Muhammad.

Among the sultan's responsibilities were issuing and enforcing specific legal orders and general rules, making the decision to go to war, levying taxes for military campaigns, ensuring the proportionate distribution of food supplies throughout the empire and, in some cases, overseeing the investigation and punishment of alleged criminals. The sultan or his appointees led the Hajj caravans from Cairo and Damascus to Mecca in the capacity of amir al-hajj (commander of the Hajj caravan). Starting with Qalawun, the sultans monopolized the provision of the Kiswa (mantle) that was annually draped over the Kaaba, in addition to patronizing Jerusalem's Dome of the Rock. Another prerogative, at least of the early Bahri sultans, was to import as many mamluks as possible, preferably those from the territories of the Mongols. The Mamluks' enemies, namely the Mongol states and their Muslim vassals, the Armenians, and the Crusaders, disrupted the flow of mamluks to the sultanate. Unable to meet the military's need for new mamluks, the sultans often resorted to recruiting wafidiyya (Ilkhanid deserters or prisoners of war).

=== Role of the caliph ===
To legitimize their rule, the Mamluks presented themselves as the defenders of Islam, and, beginning with Baybars, sought confirmation of their executive authority from a caliph. The Ayyubids had owed their allegiance to the Abbasid Caliphate, but the latter was destroyed when the Mongols sacked the Abbasid capital Baghdad in 1258 and killed Caliph al-Musta'sim. Three years later, Baybars reestablished the institution of the caliphate by making a member of the Abbasid dynasty, al-Mustansir, caliph, who in turn confirmed Baybars as sultan. The caliph recognized the sultan's authority over Egypt, Syria, the Jazira, Diyar Bakr, the Hejaz and Yemen and any territory conquered from the Crusaders or Mongols.

Al-Mustansir's Abbasid successors continued in their official capacity as caliphs, but held no real power. The less than year-long reign of Caliph al-Musta'in as sultan in 1412 was an anomaly. In an anecdotal testament to the caliph's lack of real authority, a group of rebellious mamluks responded to Lajin's presentation of the Caliph al-Hakim's decree asserting Lajin's authority with the following comment, recorded by Ibn Taghribirdi: "Stupid fellow. For God's sake—who pays any heed to the caliph now?"

The Abbasid presence was nonetheless an important political asset for the legitimacy of the Mamluk rulers and conferred significant prestige on them. The caliphs themselves also continued to be relevant figureheads even to other Muslim rulers until the end of the 14th century; for example, the sultans of Delhi, the Muzaffarid sultan Muhammad, the Jalayirid sultan Ahmad, and the Ottoman sultan Bayezid I all sought diplomas of investiture from the Abbasid caliphs or declared nominal allegiance to them. During the 15th century, however, the institution of the caliphate declined in importance and the caliphs became little more than religious dignitaries who visited the sultan on special occasions. Among other changes, this was exemplified by a shift in the caliph's ceremonial role during the accession of a Mamluk sultan to power: whereas Baybars formally pledged an oath of allegiance (bay'ah) to the Abbasid caliph al-Mustansir in 1261, some or most later caliphs formally performed a pledge of allegiance to the Mamluk sultan instead.

=== Military and administrative hierarchy ===
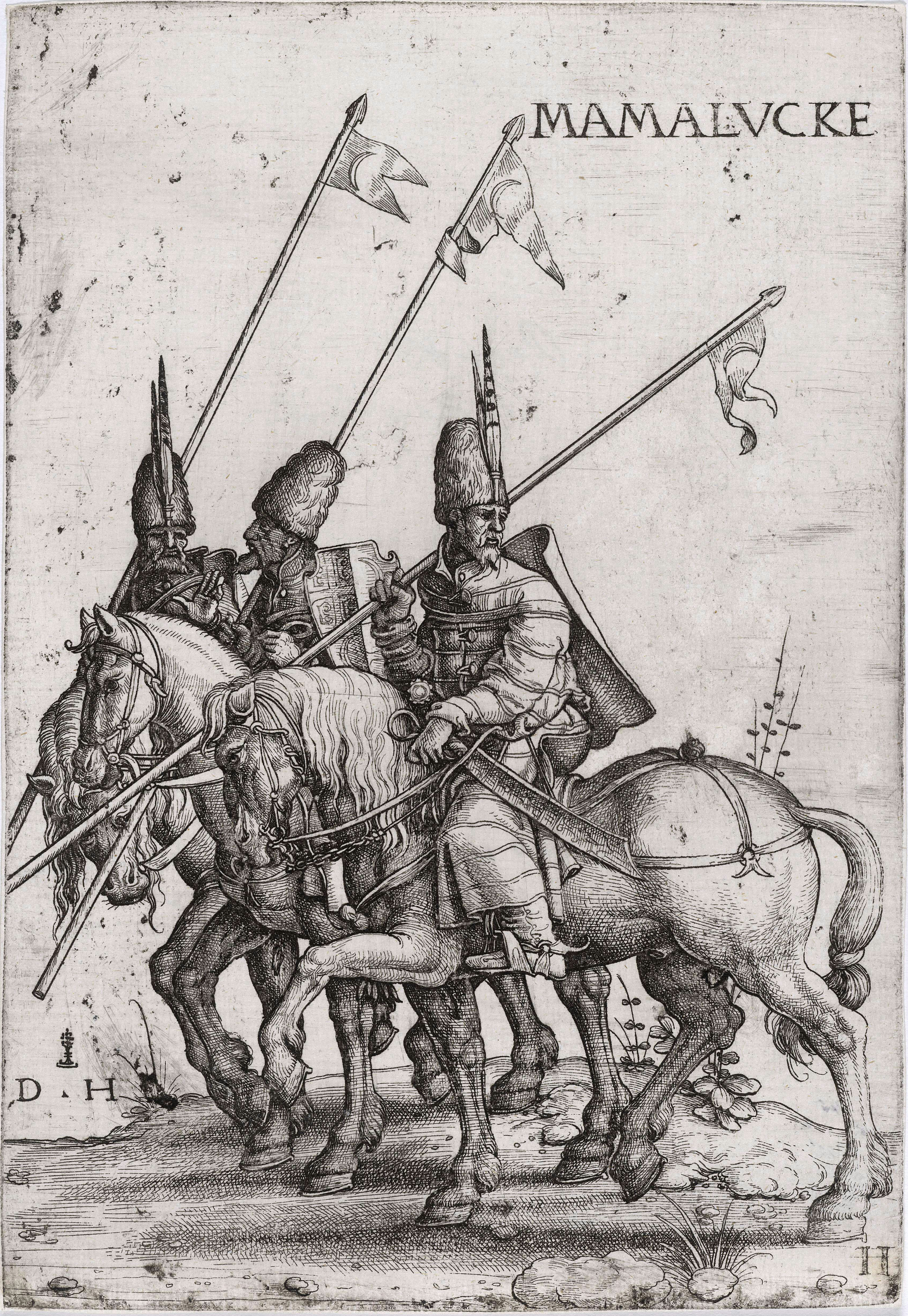
Mamluk lancers, early 16th century (etching by Daniel Hopfer). British Museum.

The sultans were products of the military hierarchy, entry into which was essentially restricted to mamluks. Awlad al-nas could enter and rise high within the hierarchy, but typically did not enter military service. Instead, many entered into mercantile, scholastic or other civilian careers. The army Baybars inherited consisted of Kurdish and Turkic tribesmen, refugees from the Ayyubid armies of Syria, and other troops from armies dispersed by the Mongols. After the Battle of Ain Jalut, Baybars restructured the army into three components: the Royal Mamluk regiment, the soldiers of the emirs, and the halqa (non-mamluk soldiers). The Royal Mamluks, were under the direct command of the sultan and the highest-ranking body within the army, entry into which was exclusive. The lower-ranking emirs had their own corps, akin to private armies, which were also mobilized by the sultan as needed. As emirs were promoted, the number of soldiers in their corps increased, and when rival emirs challenged each other's authority, they often utilized their forces, leading to major disruptions of civilian life. The halqa had inferior status to the mamluk regiments. It had its own administrative structure and was under the direct command of the sultan. The halqa regiments declined in the 14th century when professional non-mamluk soldiers generally stopped joining the force.

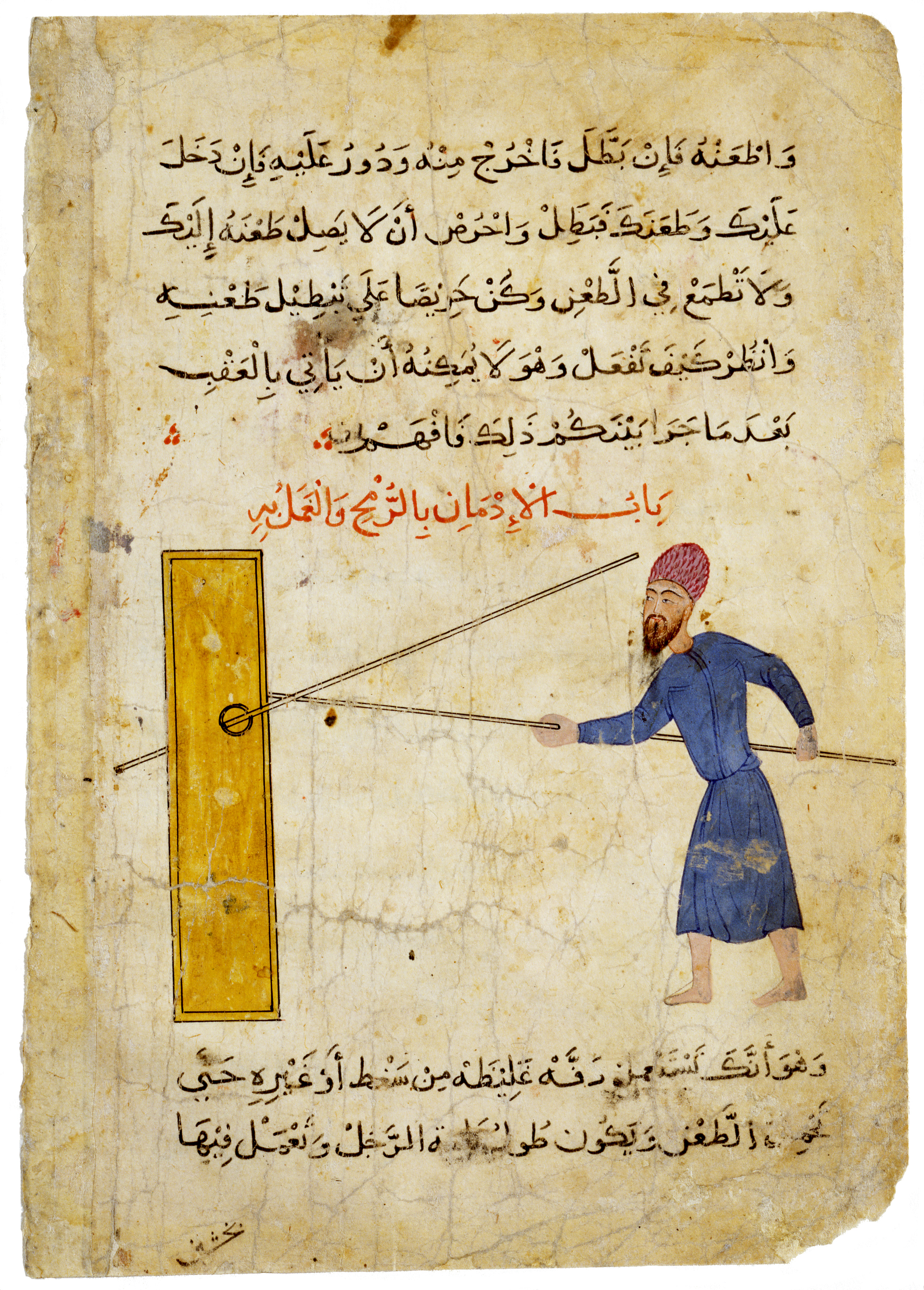
An illustration depicting a Mamluk training with a lance

One of Baybars's early reforms was creating a clear and permanent hierarchy, a system which the Ayyubids had lacked. To that end, he established a ranking system for emirs of ten, forty and one hundred, each indicating the number of mamluks assigned to an emir's command. An emir of one hundred could further be assigned one thousand mounted soldiers during battle. Baybars instituted uniformity within the army and ended the improvised nature of the Ayyubid forces in Egypt and Syria. Baybars and Qalawun standardized the undefined Ayyubid policies of distributing iqtaʿat to emirs. This reform created a clear link between an emir's rank and the size of his iqtaʿ. Baybars started biweekly inspections of the troops to verify sultanic orders were implemented, in addition to the periodic inspections where he distributed new arms to the troops. Beginning under Qalawun, the sultan and the military administration recorded all emirs in the empire and defined their roles as part of the right or left flanks of the army during wartime.

Gradually, as mamluks filled administrative and courtier posts within the state, Mamluk innovations to the Ayyubid hierarchy were developed. The offices of ustadar (majordomo), hajib (chamberlain), amir jandar (commander of the arsenal) and khazindar (treasurer), which existed during the Ayyubid period, were preserved, but Baybars added the offices of dawadar (secretary or adviser), amir akhur (commander of the royal stables), ru'us al-nawab (chief of the mamluk corps) and amir majlis (commander of the audience). These additional offices were largely ceremonial posts and were closely connected to the military hierarchy.

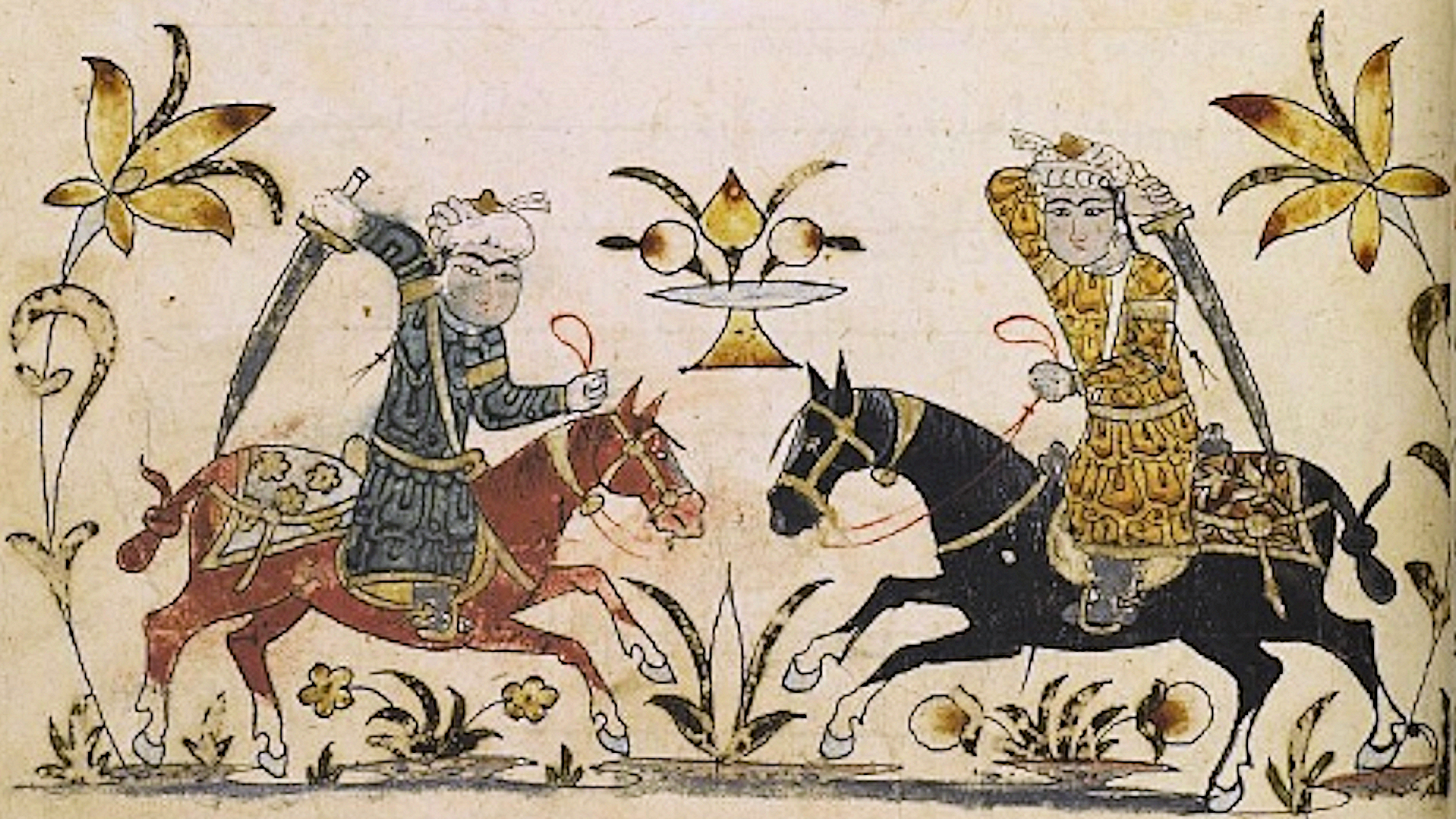
Horsemen wheeling around, with a sword in each one's hand. Nihāyat al-su’l (horsemanship manual) by Aḥmad al-Miṣrī ("the Egyptian"), dated 1371, Mamluk Egypt or Syria.

The ustadar (from the Arabic ustadh al-dar, lit. 'master of the house') was the sultan's chief of staff, responsible for organizing the royal court's daily activities, managing the sultan's personal budget, and supervising all of the buildings of the Citadel of Cairo and its staff. The ustadar was often referred to as the ustadar al-aliya (grand master of the house) to distinguish from his subordinate ustadar saghirs (lesser majordomos) who oversaw specific aspects of the court and citadel, such as the sultan's treasury, private property, and the kitchens of the citadel. Emirs had their own ustadars. The ustadar al-aliya became a powerful office in the late 14th century, particularly under Barquq and al-Nasir Faraj, who transferred the responsibilities of the special bureau for their mamluks to the authority of the ustadar, turning the latter into the state's chief financial official.

== Economy ==
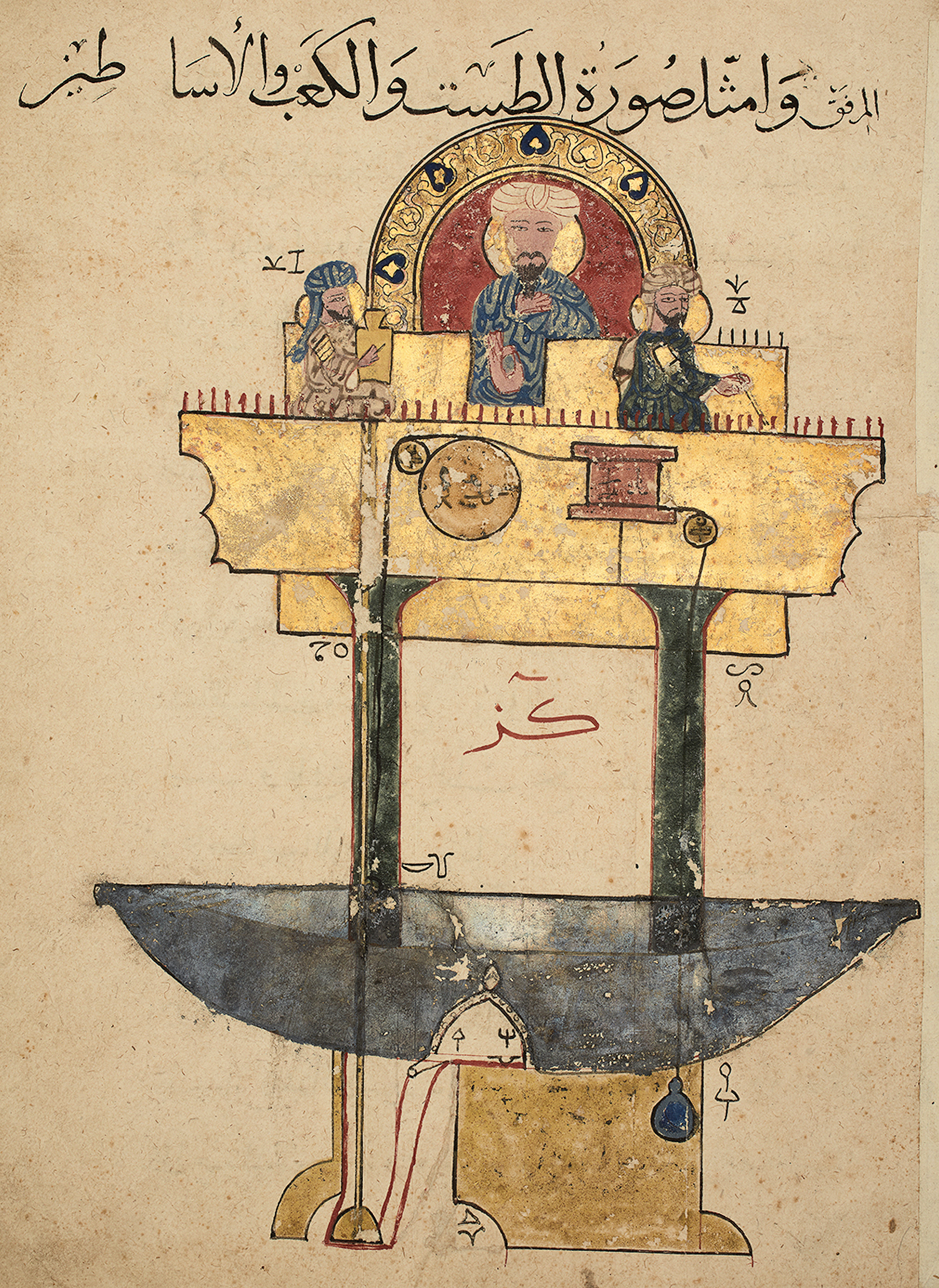
A Blood-Measuring Device: folio from a manuscript of The Book of Knowledge of Ingenious Mechanical Devices (Kitab al-hiyal al-nafisa) of Al-Jazari (1136–1206). Edition created for an amir of Mamluk Sultan Al-Nasir Muhammad in Cairo in 1354.

The Mamluk economy essentially consisted of two spheres: the state economy, which was organized like an elite household and controlled by the caste government headed by the sultan, and the free market economy, which was the domain of society and associated with the local subjects, in contrast to the ethnic outsiders of the ruling elite. The Mamluks introduced greater centralization of the economy by organizing the state bureaucracy in Cairo (Damascus and Aleppo already had organized bureaucracies), and the military hierarchy and its associated iqtaʿ system. In Egypt, the centrality of the Nile River facilitated Mamluk centralization of the region. The Mamluks used the same currency system as the Ayyubids, consisting of gold dinars, silver dirhams and copper fulus, a currency system that was standardized during the Umayyad Caliphate under the reign of Abd al-Malik ibn Marwan. The monetary system during the Mamluk period was highly unstable due to frequent monetary changes enacted by the sultans. Increased circulation of copper coins and the increased use of copper in dirhams often led to inflation.

The Mamluks created an administrative body called the hisba to supervise the market, with a muhtasib (inspector-general) in charge. There were four muhtasibs based in Cairo, Alexandria, al-Fustat and Lower Egypt. The muhtasib in Cairo was the most important and his position akin to a finance minister. The muhtasib inspected weights and measures and the quality of goods, maintained legal trade, and detected price gouging. A qadi or Muslim scholar occupied the post, but in the 15th century, mamluk emirs began to be appointed as muhtasibs to recompense them during cash shortages or as a result of the gradual shift of the muhtasib's role from the legal realm to enforcement.

=== Iqtaʿ system ===
The iqtaʿ system was inherited from the Ayyubids and further organized under the Mamluks to fit their military needs. Iqtaʿat were a central component of the Mamluk power structure. The iqtaʿ of the Muslims differed from the European concept of fiefs in that the iqtaʿ represented a right to collect revenue from a fixed territory and was accorded to an officer (an emir) as income and a financial source to provision his soldiers. Before the Mamluks' rise, there was a growing tendency of iqtaʿ holders to treat their iqtaʿ as personal, heritable property. The Mamluks effectively ended this, with the exception of some areas, mainly in Mount Lebanon, where longtime Druze iqtaʿ holders (see Buhturids), who became part of the halqa, successfully resisted the abolition of their hereditary iqtaʿat. In the Mamluk era, the iqtaʿ was an emir's main income source, and starting in 1337, Iqtaʿ holders sometimes leased or sold rights to their iqtaʿat to non-mamluks to extract more profits. By 1343, the practice was commonplace and by 1347, the sale of iqta'at became taxed. The iqtaʿ was a more stable revenue source than other methods the Mamluks employed, such as tax hikes, the sale of administrative offices, and extortion of the population. According to historian Jo van Steenbergen,

The iqtaʿ system was fundamental in assuring a legitimized, controlled and guaranteed access to the resources of the Syro-Egyptian realm to an upper level of Mamluk society that was primarily military in form and organization. As such it was a fundamental feature of Mamluk society, on the one hand giving way to a military hierarchy that crystallized into an even more developed economic hierarchy and that had substantial economic interests in society at large; on the other hand, it deeply characterized the realm's economic and social development, its agriculture, grain trade, and rural demography in particular.

The system consisted of land assignments from the state in return for military services. Land was assessed by the periodic rawk (cadastral survey), which was a survey of land parcels (measured by feddan units), assessment of land quality, and the annual estimated tax revenue of the parcels, and classification of a parcel's legal status as waqf (endowment) or iqtaʿ. The rawk organized the iqtaʿ system and the first was carried out in 1298 under Lajin. A second and final rawk was completed in 1315 under al-Nasir Muhammad and influenced political and economic developments of the Mamluk Sultanate until its fall in the early 16th century.

Gradually, the iqtaʿ system was expanded, and increasingly larger areas of kharaj (taxable lands) were appropriated as iqtaʿ lands to meet the fiscal needs of the military, namely payment of emirs and their subordinates. The state resolved to increase allotments by dispersing an emir's iqtaʿat across several provinces and for short terms. This led to iqtaʿ holders neglecting the administrative oversight, maintenance, and infrastructure of their iqtaʿat, and concentrating solely on collecting taxes, resulting in less productivity.

=== Agriculture ===
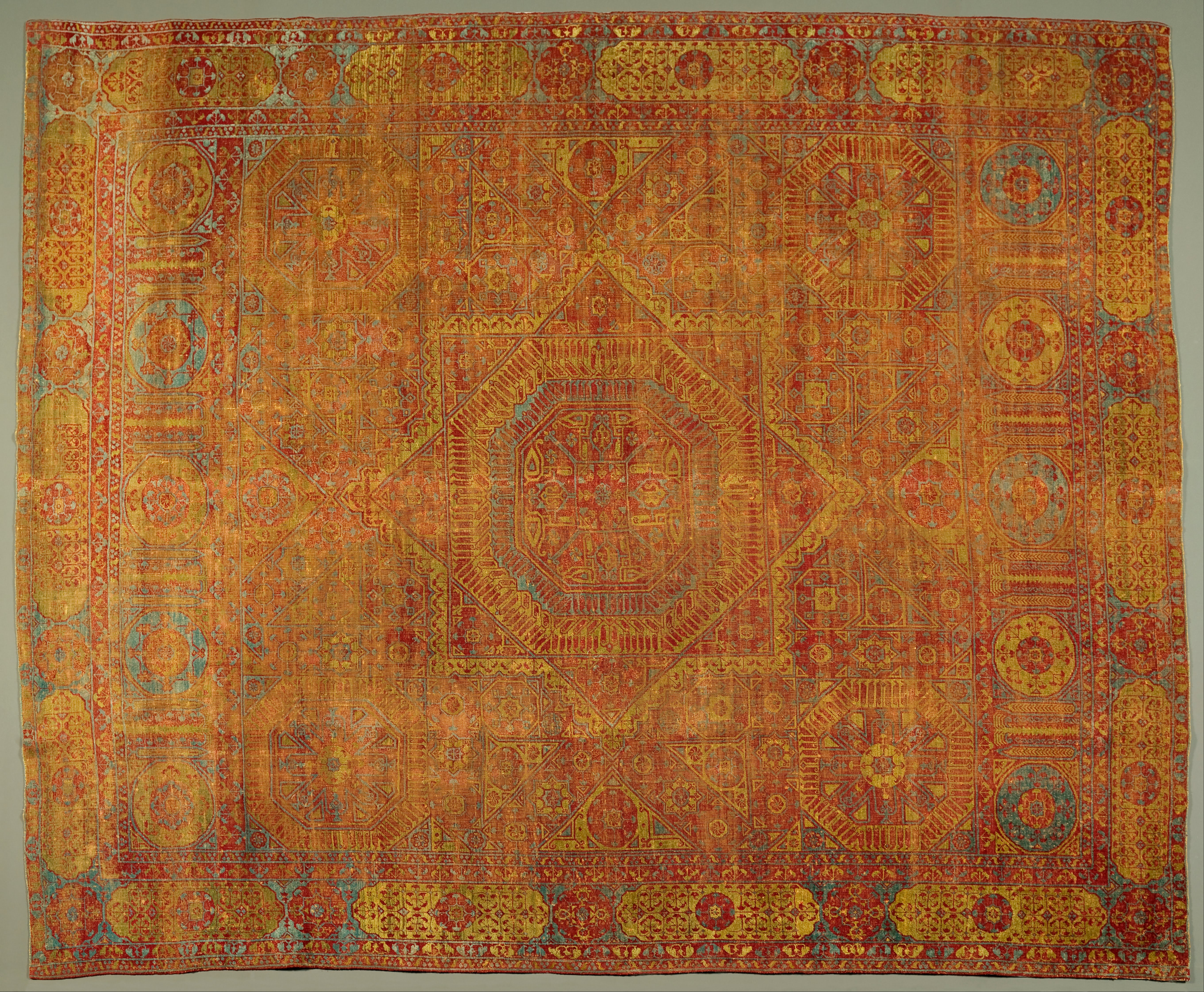
Mamluk Wool Carpet, Egypt, c. 1500–1550. Museum of Islamic Art, Doha

Agriculture was the primary source of revenue in the Mamluk economy. Agricultural products were the main exports of Mamluk Egypt, Syria and Palestine. Moreover, the major industries of sugar and textile production depended on crops (sugar cane and cotton). Every agricultural commodity was taxed by the state, with the sultan's treasury taking the largest share of the revenues; emirs and major private brokers followed. An emir's main source of income were the agricultural products of his iqtaʿ.

In Egypt, Mamluk centralization of agricultural production was more thorough than in Syria and Palestine. All agriculture in Egypt depended on a single source of irrigation, the Nile, and the measures and rights to irrigation were determined by the river's flooding, whereas in Syria and Palestine, there were multiple sources of mostly rain-fed irrigation, and measures and rights were determined at the local level. Centralization in Syria and Palestine was also more complicated than in Egypt due to the diversity of those regions' geography and their frequent invasions. The state's role in Syro-Palestinian agriculture was restricted to the fiscal administration and to the irrigation networks and other rural infrastructure. Although the degree of centralization was not as high as in Egypt, the Mamluks imposed sufficient control over the Syrian economy to derive significant revenues. The maintenance of the Mamluk army in Syria relied on the state's control over Syrian agricultural revenues.

Among the responsibilities of a Mamluk provincial or district governor were repopulating abandoned areas to foster agricultural production, protecting the lands from Bedouin raids, increasing productivity in barren lands (likely through the upkeep and expansion of existing irrigation networks), and devoting special attention to the cultivation of the more arable low-lying regions. To ensure rural life was undisturbed by Bedouin raiding, which disrupted agricultural work or damaged crops and agrarian infrastructure and thus decreased revenues, the Mamluks attempted to prevent Bedouin armament and confiscate existing weapons from them.

=== Trade and industry ===
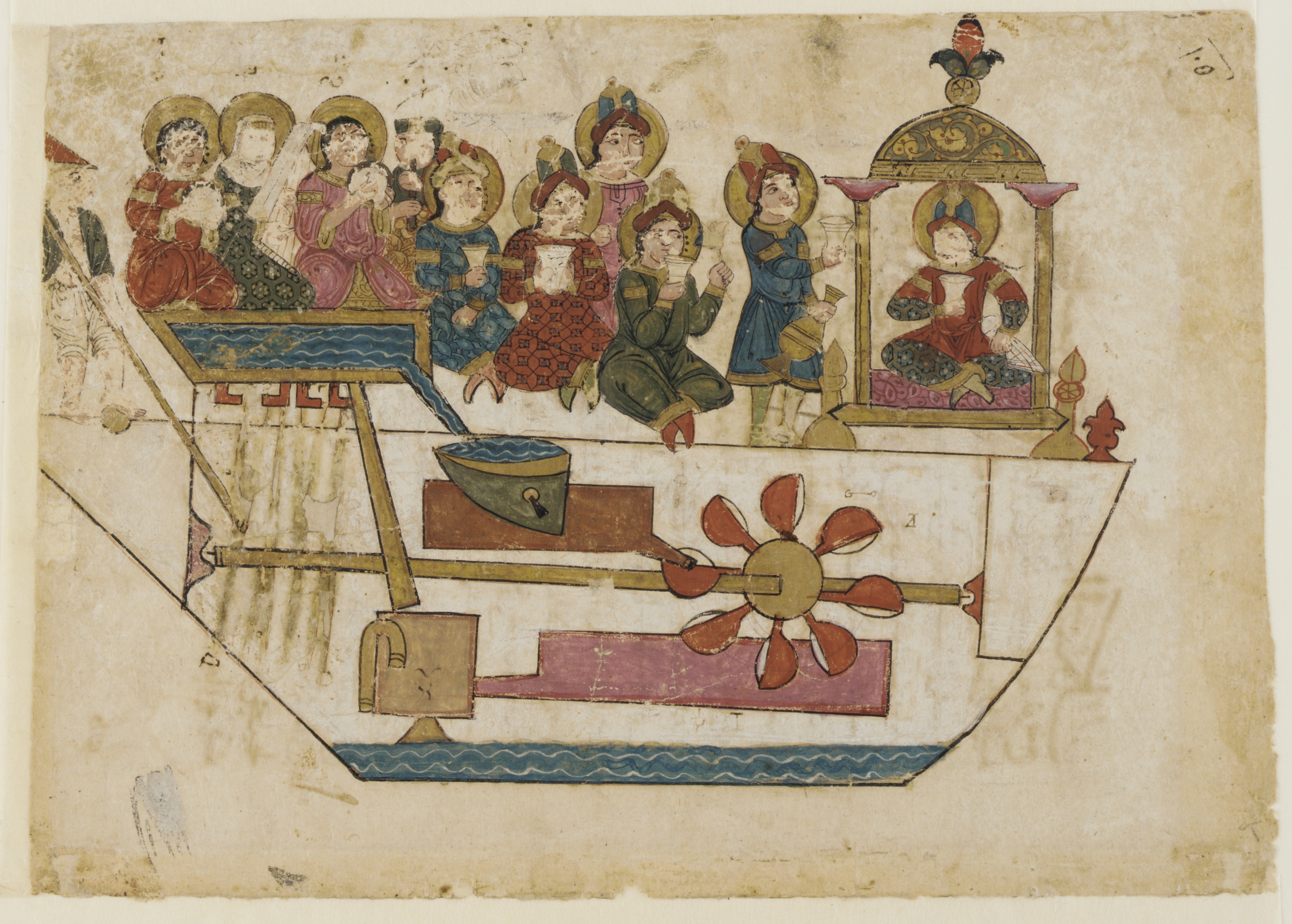
Al-Jazarī (d. 1206), The Musical Boat. Mamluk period, 1315.

Egypt and Syria played a central transit role in international trade in the Middle Ages. Early into their rule, the Mamluks expanded the empire's role in foreign trade, with Baybars signing a commercial treaty with Genoa and Qalawun signing a similar agreement with Ceylon. By the 15th century, internal upheaval from Mamluk power struggles, diminishing iqtaʿ revenue from plagues, and the encroachment of abandoned farmlands by Bedouin tribes had led to a financial crisis in the sultanate. To compensate these losses, the Mamluks applied a three-pronged approach: taxing the urban middle classes, boosting production and sale of cotton and sugar to Europe, and profiting from their transit position in the trade between Europe and the Far East. The last was the Mamluks' most lucrative policy and was accomplished by cultivating trade ties with Venice, Genoa and Barcelona, and increasing tariffs on commodities. At this time, the long-established trade between Europe and the Islamic world began to make up a significant part of state revenues as the Mamluks taxed the merchants operating or passing through the empire's ports.

Mamluk Egypt was a major producer of textiles and a supplier of raw materials for Western Europe. The frequent outbreaks of the Black Plague led to a decline in the production of textiles, silk products, sugar, glass, soaps, and paper, which coincided with the Europeans' increasing production of these goods. Trade continued nonetheless and despite papal restrictions on trade with the Muslims during the Crusades. Mediterranean trade was dominated by spices, such as pepper, muscat nuts and flowers, cloves and cinnamon, as well as medicinal drugs and indigo. These goods originated in Persia, India, and Southeast Asia and made their way to Europe via the Mamluk ports of Syria and Egypt. These ports were frequented by European merchants, who in turn sold gold and silver ducats and bullion, silk, wool and linen fabrics, furs, wax, honey, and cheeses.

Under Barsbay, a state monopoly was established on luxury goods, namely spices, with the state setting prices and collecting a percentage of the profits. In 1387, Barsbay established direct control over Alexandria, the principal Egyptian commercial port, transferring its tax revenues to his personal treasury (diwan al-khass) instead of the imperial treasury, which was linked with the military's iqtaʿ system. In 1429, he ordered the spice trade to Europe be conducted through Cairo before goods reached Alexandria to end the direct transportation of spices from the Red Sea to Alexandria. In the late 15th and early 16th centuries, the Portuguese expansion into Africa and Asia significantly decreased the revenues of the Mamluk–Venetian monopoly on trans-Mediterranean trade. This contributed to and coincided with the fall of the sultanate.

== Culture ==
=== Art ===
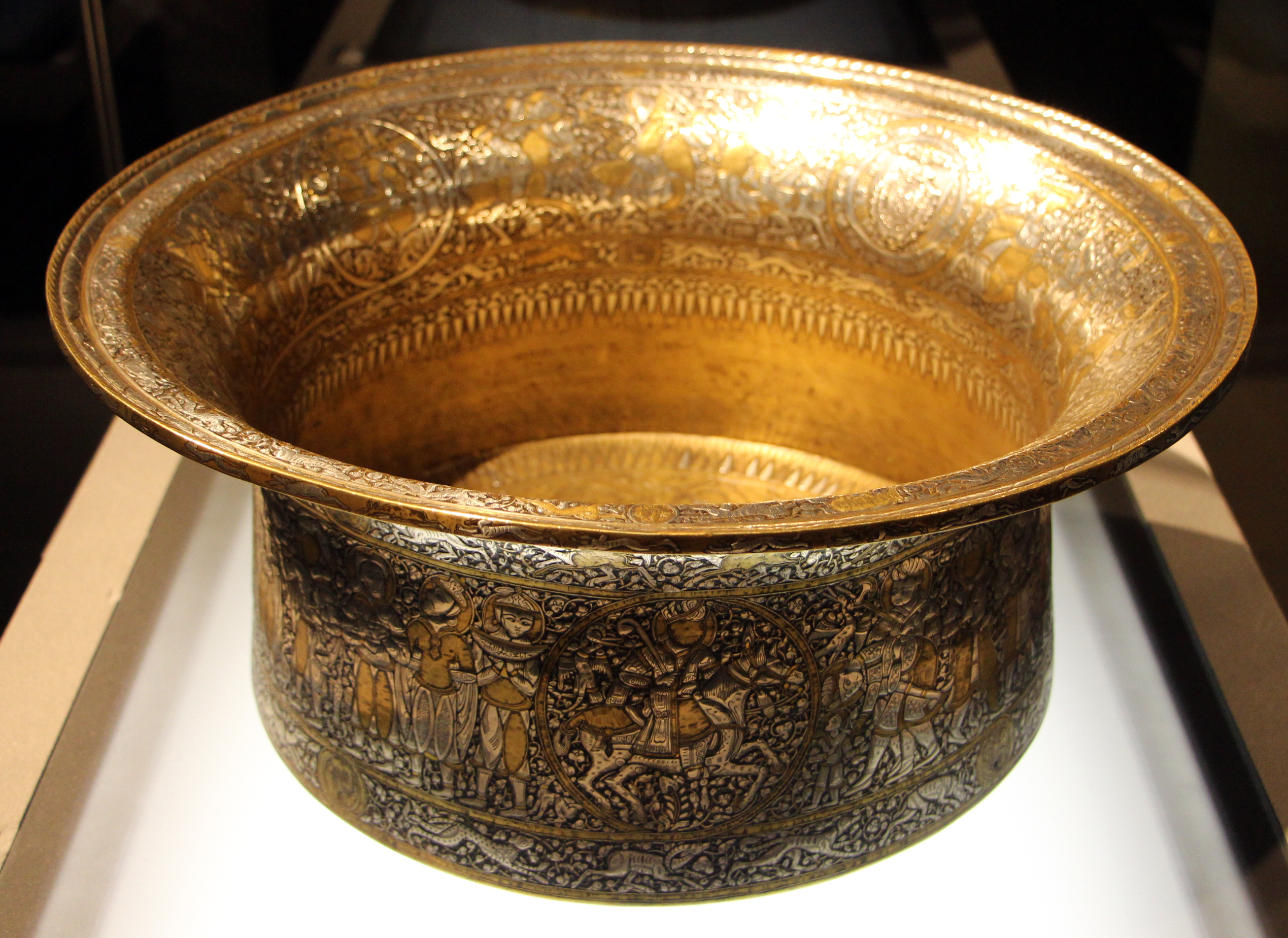
Baptistère de Saint Louis, basin from the reign of al-Nasir Muhammad (r. 1285–1341), which from the 17th century was used as a baptismal font for French kings. Louvre

Mamluk decorative arts—especially enameled and gilded glass, inlaid metalwork, woodwork, and textiles—were prized around the Mediterranean as well as in Europe, where they had a profound impact on local production. Mamluk glassware influenced the Venetian glass industry. Trade with Iran, India, and China was even more extensive, turning Mamluk cities into centers of both trade and consumption. Imported luxury goods from the East sometimes influenced local artistic vocabularies, as exemplified by the incorporation of Chinese motifs into both objects and architecture. The Mamluks themselves, as former slaves who rose through the ranks by their own efforts, were status-conscious patrons who commissioned luxury objects marked with emblems of their ownership. Architecture was the most significant form of Mamluk patronage, and numerous artistic objects were commissioned to furnish Mamluk religious buildings, such as glass lamps, Qur'an manuscripts, brass candlesticks, and wooden minbars. Decorative motifs in one art form were often applied in other art forms, including architecture.

Patronage varied over time, but the two high points of the arts were the reigns of al-Nasir Muhammad and Qaitbay. Some art forms also varied in importance over time. For example, enameled glassware was a prominent industry during the first half of the Mamluk period but declined significantly in the 15th century. Most of the surviving examples of carpets, by contrast, date from the end of the Mamluk period. Ceramic production was relatively less important overall, in part because Chinese porcelains were widely available.

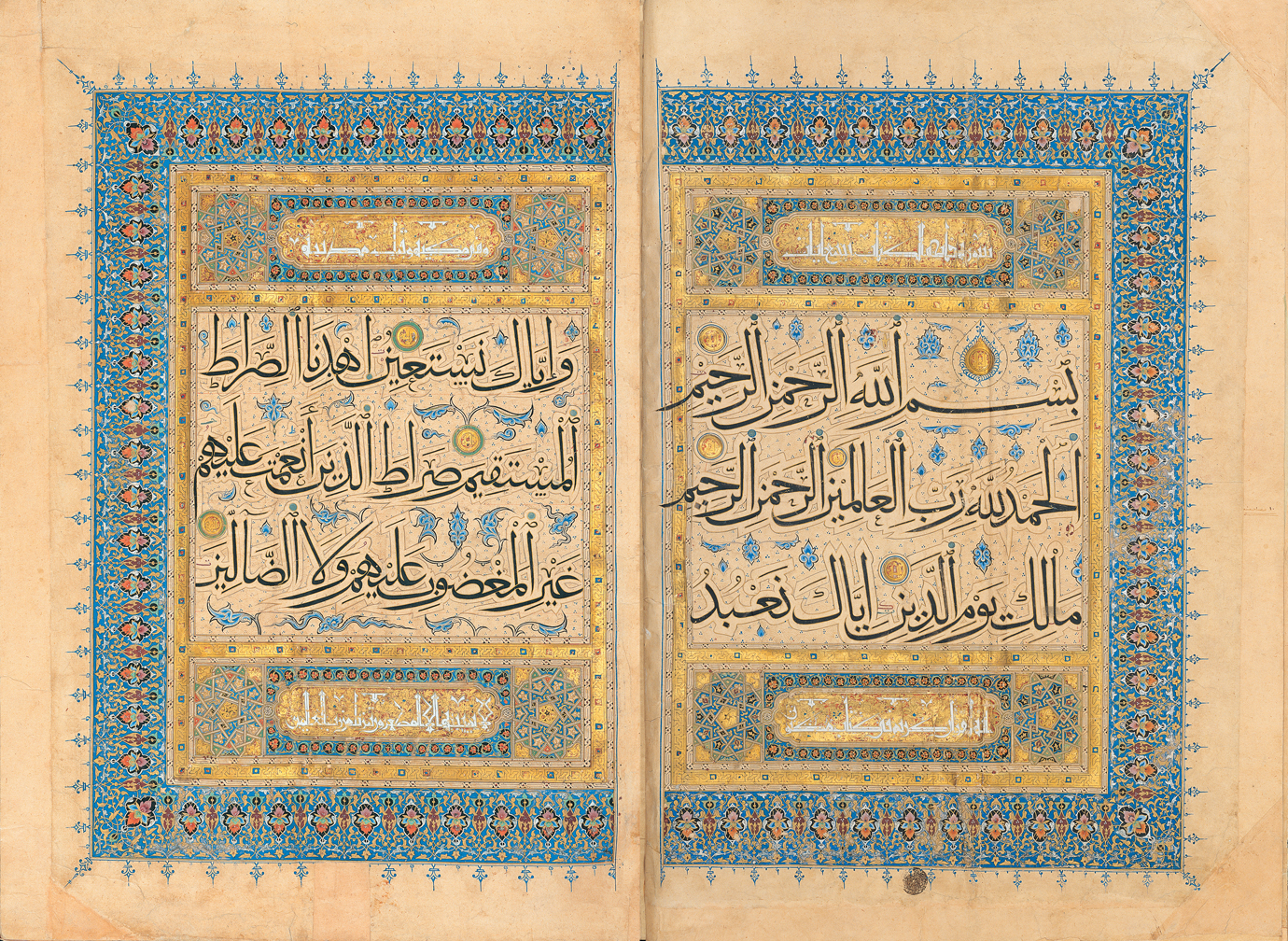
Qur'an commissioned by sultan al-Ashraf Sha'ban, dated to 1372

In the art of manuscript decoration, the Qur'an was the book most commonly produced with a high degree of artistic elaboration. Cairo, Damascus, and Aleppo were among the main centers of manuscript production. Mamluk-period Qur'ans were richly illuminated and exhibit stylistic similarities with those produced under the contemporary Ilkhanids in Iran. The production of high-quality paper at this time also allowed for pages to be larger, which encouraged artists to elaborate new motifs and designs to fill these larger formats. Some manuscripts could be monumental in size; for example, one Qur'an manuscript produced for al-Ashraf Sha'ban measured between 75 and 105 centimetres tall. One of the stylistic features that distinguished Mamluk manuscript decoration was the presence of gilded foliate scrollwork over pastel-coloured backgrounds set within wide margins. Frontispieces were often decorated with star-shaped or hexagonal geometric motifs.

Metalware, whether in the form of ewers, basins, or candlesticks, was widely used in various contexts and many examples have survived today. They were made of brass or bronze with inlaid decoration, though in the later periods decoration was often engraved rather than inlaid. The quality and quantity of metalwork was also generally higher in the early period. One of the best examples of this period is the so-called Baptistère of Saint-Louis (kept at the Louvre today), a large brass basin inlaid with arabesques and horizontal scenes of animals, hunters, and riders playing polo. An example of the later period is a series of candlesticks commissioned by Qaitbay for Muhammad's tomb in the Prophet's Mosque in Medina. They are made of engraved brass, with black bitumen filling parts of the surfaces in order to create contrast with the motifs in polished brass. Their decoration consists almost entirely of Arabic calligraphy, with the thuluth script prominently used.

Glass lamps were another high point of Mamluk art, particularly those commissioned for mosques. Egypt and Syria already possessed a rich tradition of glassmaking before this period and Damascus was the most important production center during the Mamluk period. Coloured glass had been common in the preceding Ayyubid period, but during the Mamluk period enamel and gilding became the most important techniques of decorating glass. Mosque lamps had a bulbous body with a wide flaring neck at the top. They were produced in the thousands and suspended from the ceiling by chains.

=== Architecture ===
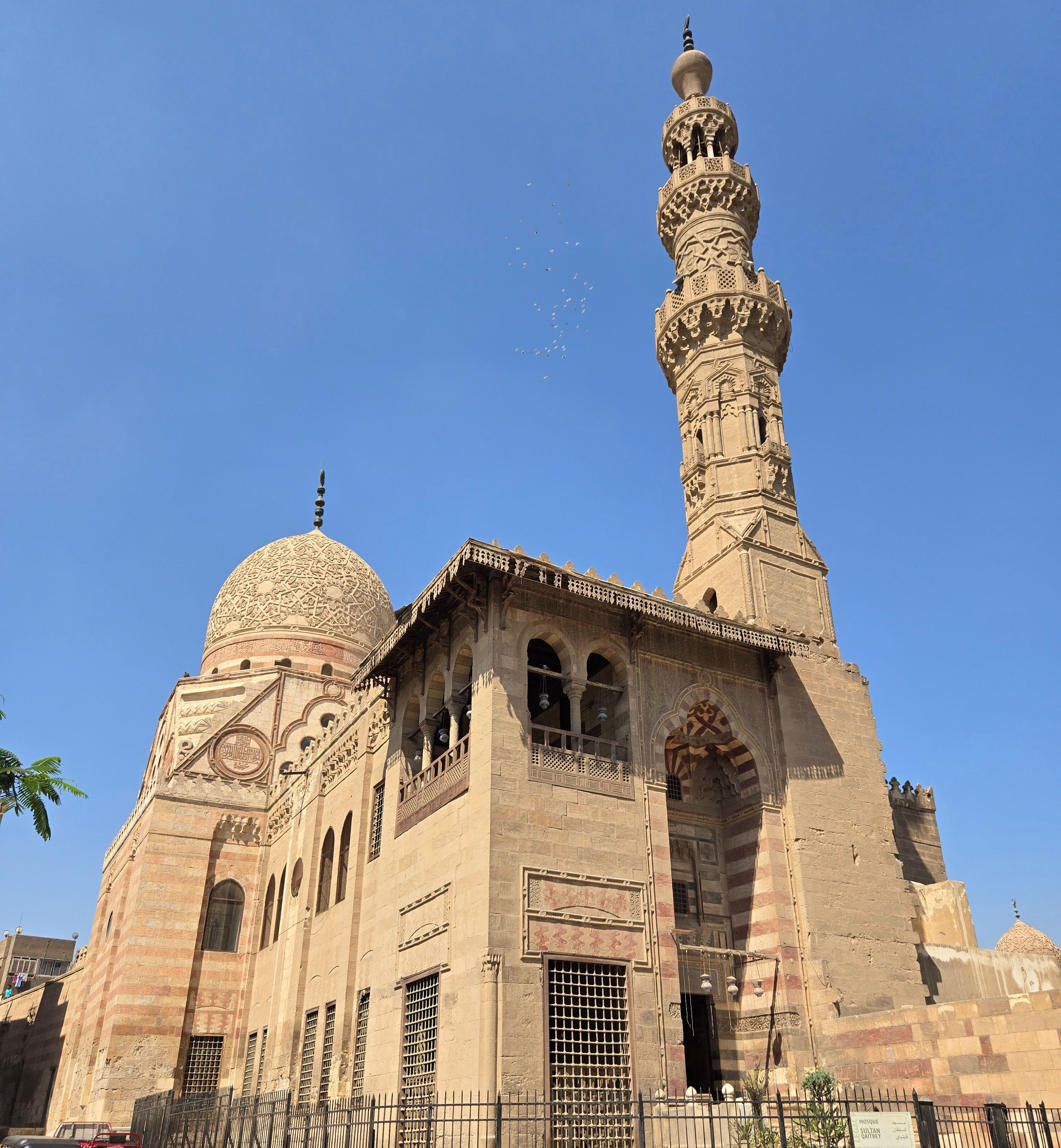
Funerary complex of Sultan Qaitbay (built 1470–1474), one of the finest examples of late Mamluk architecture

Mamluk architecture is distinguished in part by the construction of multi-functional buildings whose floor plans became increasingly creative and complex due to the limited available space in the city and the desire to make monuments visually dominant in their urban surroundings. While Cairo was the main center of patronage, Mamluk architecture also appears in Damascus, Jerusalem, Aleppo, and Medina. Patrons, including sultans and high-ranking emirs, typically set out to build mausoleums for themselves but attached to them charitable structures such as madrasas, zawiyas, sabils (public fountains), or mosques. The revenues and expenses of these charitable complexes were governed by inalienable waqf agreements that also served the secondary purpose of ensuring some form of income or property for the patrons' descendants.

The cruciform or four-iwan floor plan was adopted for madrasas and became more common for new monumental complexes than the traditional hypostyle mosque, though the vaulted iwans of the early period were replaced with flat-roofed iwans in the later period. The decoration of monuments also became more elaborate over time, with stone-carving and colored marble paneling and mosaics (including ablaq) replacing stucco as the most dominant architectural decoration. Monumental decorated entrance portals became common compared to earlier periods, often carved with muqarnas. Influences from Syria, Ilkhanid Iran, and possibly even Venice were evident in these trends. Minarets, which were also elaborate, usually consisted of three tiers separated by balconies, with each tier having a different design than the others. Late Mamluk minarets, for example, most typically had an octagonal shaft for the first tier, a round shaft on the second, and a lantern structure with finial on the third level. Domes also transitioned from wooden or brick structures, sometimes of bulbous shape, to pointed stone domes with complex geometric or arabesque motifs carved into their outer surfaces. The peak of this stone dome architecture was achieved under Qaitbay in the late 15th century.

After the Ottoman conquest of 1517, new Ottoman-style buildings were introduced, however the Mamluk style continued to be repeated or combined with Ottoman elements in many subsequent monuments. Some building types which first appeared in the late Mamluk period, such as sabil-kuttabs (a combination of sabil and kuttab) and multi-storied caravanserais (wikalas or khans), actually grew in number during the Ottoman period. In modern times, from the late 19th century onwards, a neo-Mamluk style also appeared, partly as a nationalist response against Ottoman and European styles, in an effort to promote local 'Egyptian' styles.

=== Emblems and blazons ===
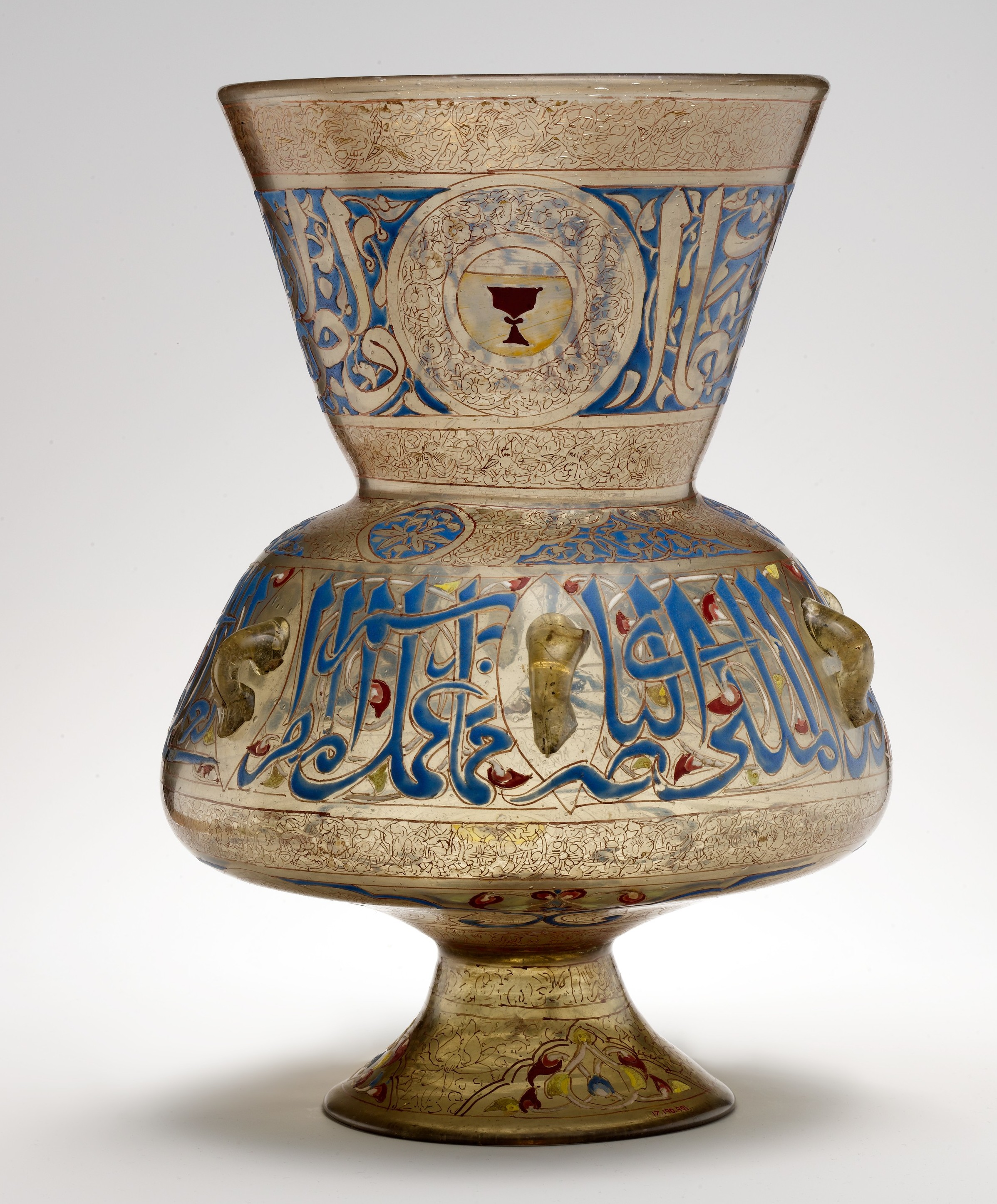
Mosque lamp of Amir Qawsun, dated 1329. Qawsun's blazon, a red cup on a yellow field, is prominently visible on the upper section. Metropolitan Museum of Art.

Mamluk sultans and emirs had personal blazons, which were important symbols of their status and a distinctive cultural feature of the Mamluk ruling class. With the possible exception of the earliest years of the regime, Mamluks chose their own blazons. This was done while they were emirs, and the blazon usually symbolized the office or position they held at this time. The blazon appeared on their banners, and it was retained even after they became sultans. Such blazons were an important feature of Mamluk visual culture, and they are found on all kinds of objects manufactured for Mamluk patrons. They were also featured in Mamluk architecture, though less consistently. This heraldic practice was unique in the medieval Muslim world.

Unlike European heraldry, Mamluk blazons used a much more limited set of images and symbols for their charges: only about forty-five symbols were used. Early Mamluk blazons were simple, usually featuring a single symbol such as a cup, sword, or an animal. Some banners were merely distinguished by patterned fabrics and plain geometric divisions. The blazon of Baybars was a panther, lion, or leopard, while that of Qalawun, according to one author, was a fleur-de-lis. From the late 13th century to the mid-14th century, the crescent moon appears on Mamluk ceramics and some Mamluk coins, either alone or in conjunction with other symbols, though it was rarely used for personal blazons. Starting with al-Nasir Muhammad, epigraphic blazons (with Arabic calligraphy) became part of the heraldic repertoire.

From the late 14th to the mid-15th centuries, blazons became more complex and their shields were usually divided into three parts, with the main symbol placed within each division, sometimes in pairs. After this, late Mamluk blazons became even more elaborate but were more homogenous in style. They were filled with details, including up to five or six different symbols. By this point, they were possibly no longer used as individualized personal blazons but perhaps more as general marks of their social class.

The Mamluk sultans also followed the Ayyubids in using yellow as the official colour associated with the sultan and used on sultanic banners. Baybars is said to have noted the yellow colour of his banners in opposition to the red banners of Bohemund VI. After Selim II conquered Damascus in 1516, a contemporary writer, Ibn Tulun, noted that the rich yellow silk banner of the Mamluks was replaced by the plain red banner of the Ottomans. Red banners are also known to have been used by the Mamluks, as the historian Ibn Taghribirdi (d. 1470) recorded that Sultan al-Mu'ayyad gifted a red banner to one of his vassals in Anatolia.

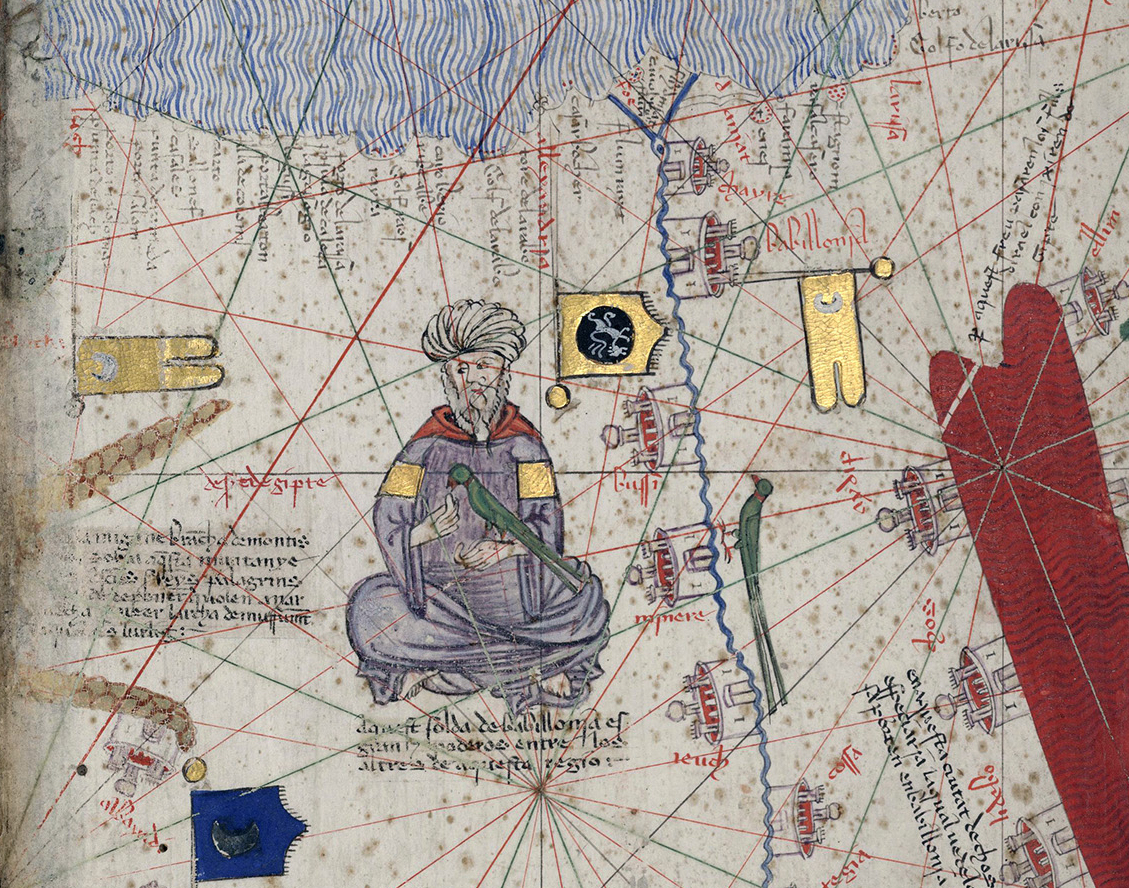
Representation of Mamluk Egypt in the medieval European Catalan Atlas (1375)

Various symbols were also used to represent the Mamluk realm in European sources. The Book of Knowledge of All Kingdoms, written by an anonymous European author after 1360, attributes to Cairo a white flag with a blue crescent moon. In the Catalan Atlas of 1375, created by a Majorcan cartographer (likely Abraham Cresques), the Mamluk empire is symbolized by the drawing of a Muslim ruler shown with a green parrot on his arm, the latter possibly a symbol of nobility. Next to this, an icon symbolizing Babylon (alongside Cairo), is marked by a yellow flag with a crescent moon, with the crescent representing Muslim rule. Nearby, the city of Alexandria is marked with a flag containing the panther symbol of the former Sultan Baybars, whose reputation was known from the Crusades.

== See also ==
- Furusiyya
- Egypt in the Middle Ages
- List of Sunni Muslim dynasties
- Military of the Mamluk Sultanate
- Janibak al-Sufi revolt

== Bibliography ==
- Amitai, Reuven (2006). "The Logistics of the Mamluk-Mongol War, with Special Reference to the Battle of Wadi'l-Khaznadar, 1299 C.E.". In Pryor, John H. (ed.). Logistics of Warfare in the Age of the Crusades. Ashgate Publishing. ISBN 978-0-7546-5197-0.
- Asbridge, Thomas (2010). The Crusades: The War for the Holy Land. Simon and Schuster. ISBN 978-1-84983-770-5.
- Avcıoğlu, Nebahat; Volait, Mercedes (2017). ""Jeux de miroir": Architecture of Istanbul and Cairo from Empire to Modernism". In Necipoğlu, Gülru; Barry Flood, Finbarr (eds.). A Companion to Islamic Art and Architecture. Wiley Blackwell. ISBN 978-1-119-06857-0.
- Ayalon, David (1960). "Al-Baḥriyya". In Gibb, H. A. R.; Kramers, J. H.; Lévi-Provençal, E.; Schacht, J.; Lewis, B. & Pellat, Ch. (eds.). The Encyclopaedia of Islam, Second Edition. Volume I: A–B. Leiden: E. J. Brill. pp. 944–945. OCLC 495469456.
- Ayubi, Nazih N. (1996). Over-stating the Arab State: Politics and Society in the Middle East. Bloomsbury Publishing. ISBN 9780857715494.
- Barker, Hannah (2021). "What Caused the 14th-Century Tatar–Circassian Shift?". Slavery in the Black Sea Region, C.900–1900: Forms of Unfreedom at the Intersection Between Christianity and Islam. Leiden: Brill. pp. 339–363. ISBN 978-90-04-47071-2.
- Behrens-Abouseif, Doris (2007). Cairo of the Mamluks: A History of Architecture and its Culture. Cairo: American University in Cairo Press. ISBN 978-977-416-077-6.
- Behrens-Abouseif, Doris (2009). "The Jalayirid Connection in Mamluk Metalware". Muqarnas. 26 (1): 149–159. doi:10.1163/22118993-90000147. ISSN 0732-2992. JSTOR 27811138.
- Behrens-Abouseif, Doris (2012). The Arts of the Mamluks in Egypt and Syria: Evolution and Impact. V&R unipress GmbH. ISBN 978-3-89971-915-4.
- Behrens-Abouseif, Doris (2014). "Africa". Practising Diplomacy in the Mamluk Sultanate: Gifts and Material Culture in the Medieval Islamic World. I. B. Tauris. ISBN 978-0-85773-541-6.
- Binbaş, İlker Evrim (2014). "A Damascene Eyewitness to the Battle of Nicopolis". In Chrissis, Nikolaos G.; Carr, Mike (eds.). Contact and Conflict in Frankish Greece and the Aegean, 1204–1453: Crusade, Religion and Trade between Latins, Greeks and Turks. Ashgate Publishing. ISBN 978-1-4094-3926-4.
- Blair, Sheila S.; Bloom, Jonathan M. (1995). The Art and Architecture of Islam, 1250–1800. Yale University Press. ISBN 978-0-300-05888-8.
- Bloom, Jonathan; Blair, Sheila (2009). "Flags". Grove Encyclopedia of Islamic Art & Architecture. Vol. 2. Oxford University Press. pp. 75–76. ISBN 978-0-19-530991-1.
- Bosworth, C. E. (1996). New Islamic Dynasties: A Chronological and Genealogical Manual. Edinburgh University Press. ISBN 978-1-4744-6462-8.
- Brummett, Palmira Johnson (1994). Ottoman Seapower and Levantine Diplomacy in the Age of Discovery. Albany: State University of New York Press. ISBN 978-0-7914-1701-0.
- Christ, Georg (2012). Trading Conflicts: Venetian Merchants and Mamluk Officials in Late Medieval Alexandria. Brill. ISBN 978-90-04-22199-4.
- Clifford, Winslow William (2013). Conermann, Stephan (ed.). State Formation and the Structure of Politics in Mamluk Syro-Egypt, 648–741 A.H./1250–1340 C.E. Bonn University Press. ISBN 978-3-8471-0091-1.
- Clot, André (2009) [1996]. L'Égypte des Mamelouks: L'empire des esclaves, 1250–1517 (in French). Perrin. ISBN 978-2-262-03045-2.
- Conermann, Stephan (2021). "Slavery in the Mamluk Sultanate". The Cambridge World History of Slavery: Volume 2, AD 500-AD 1420. Storbritannien: Cambridge University Press. pp. 383–405.
- Cummins, Joseph (2011). History's Greatest Wars: The Epic Conflicts that Shaped the Modern World. Fair Winds Press. ISBN 978-1-61058-055-7.
- Drory, Joseph (2006). "The Prince who Favored the Desert: Fragmentary Biography of al-Nasir Ahmad (d. 745/1344)". In Wasserstein, David J.; Ayalon, Ami (eds.). Mamluks and Ottomans: Studies in Honour of Michael Winter. Routledge. ISBN 9-78-0-415-37278-7.
- Elbendary, Amina (2015). Crowds and Sultans: Urban Protest in Late Medieval Egypt and Syria. American University in Cairo Press. ISBN 978-977-416-717-1.
- Farhad, Massumeh; Rettig, Simon (2016). The Art of the Qu'ran: Treasures from the Museum of Turkish and Islamic Arts. Washington, DC: Smithsonian Institution. ISBN 978-1-58834-578-3.
- Fischel, Walter Joseph (1967). Ibn Khaldūn in Egypt: His Public Functions and His Historical Research, 1382–1406, a Study in Islamic Historiography. University of California Press.
- Fuess, Albrecht (2022). "Why Domenico Had to Die and Black Slaves Wore Red Uniforms: Military Technology and Its Decisive Role in the 1517 Ottoman Conquest of Egypt". In Conermann, Stephan; Şen, Gül (eds.). The Mamluk-Ottoman Transition: Continuity and Change in Egypt and Bilād al-Shām in the Sixteenth Century, 2. Bonn University Press. ISBN 978-3-8470-1152-1.
- Garcin, Jean-Claude (1998). "The Regime of the Circassian Mamluks". In Petry, Carl F. (ed.). The Cambridge History of Egypt, Volume 1. Cambridge University Press. ISBN 978-0-521-06885-7.
- Grainger, John D. (2016). Syria: An Outline History. Pen and Sword. ISBN 978-1-4738-6083-4.
- Haarmann, Ulrich (1998). "Joseph's Law – The Careers and Activities of Mamluk Descendants before the Ottoman Conquest of Egypt". In Philipp, Thomas; Haarmann, Ulrich (eds.). The Mamluks in Egyptian Politics and Society. Cambridge University Press. ISBN 978-0-5215-9115-7.
- Al-Harithy, Howyda N. (1996). "The Complex of Sultan Hasan in Cairo: Reading Between the Lines". In Necıpoğlu, Gülru (ed.). Muqarnas: An Annual on the Visual Culture of the Islamic World, Volume 13. Leiden: Brill. pp. 68–79. ISBN 90-04-10633-2.
- Hathaway, Jane (2012). A Tale of Two Factions: Myth, Memory, and Identity in Ottoman Egypt and Yemen. State University of New York Press. ISBN 978-0-7914-8610-8.
- Hathaway, Jane (2019). "Mamlūks, Ottoman period". In Fleet, Kate; Krämer, Gudrun; Matringe, Denis; Nawas, John; Rowson, Everett (eds.). Encyclopaedia of Islam, Three. Brill. pp. 124–129. ISBN 978-90-04-16165-8.
- Heng, Geraldine (2018). The Invention of Race in the European Middle Ages. Cambridge University Press. ISBN 978-1-108-42278-9.
- El-Hibri, Tayeb (2021). The Abbasid Caliphate: A History. Cambridge History Press. ISBN 9781316634394.
- Hillenbrand, Carole (2007). Turkish Myth and Muslim Symbol: The Battle of Manzikert. Edinburgh: Edinburgh University Press. ISBN 978-0-7486-2572-7.
- Holt, Peter Malcolm; Daly, M. W. (1961). A History of the Sudan: From the Coming of Islam to the Present Day. Weidenfeld and Nicolson. ISBN 978-1-317-86366-3.
- Holt, Peter Malcolm (1984). "Some Observations on the 'Abbāsid Caliphate of Cairo". Bulletin of the School of Oriental and African Studies. 47 (3): 501–507. doi:10.1017/s0041977x00113710. S2CID 161092185.
- Holt, Peter Malcolm (1986). The Age of the Crusades: The Near East from the Eleventh Century to 1517. Addison Wesley Longman. ISBN 978-1-317-87152-1.
- Holt, Peter Malcolm (1991). "Mamlūks". In Bosworth, C. E.; van Donzel, E. & Pellat, Ch. (eds.). The Encyclopaedia of Islam, Second Edition. Volume VI: Mahk–Mid. Leiden: E. J. Brill. pp. 321–330. ISBN 978-90-04-08112-3.
- Holt, Peter Malcolm (2005). "The Position and Power of the Mamluk Sultan". In Hawting, G.R. (ed.). Muslims, Mongols and Crusaders: An Anthology of Articles Published in the Bulletin of the School of Oriental and African Studies. Routledge. ISBN 978-0-415-45096-6.
- Holt, Peter M.; Baker, Raymond William; Smith, Charles Gordon; Hopwood, Derek; Little, Donald P.; Goldschmidt, Arthur Eduard (2025). "Egypt: History: The Mamluk and Ottoman periods (1250–1800)". Encyclopedia Britannica.
- Irwin, Robert (1986). The Middle East in the Middle Ages: The Early Mamluk Sultanate, 1250–1382. Carbondale, Illinois: Southern Illinois University Press. ISBN 0-8093-1286-7.
- Isichei, Elizabeth (1997). A History of African Societies to 1870. Cambridge University Press. ISBN 978-0-521-45599-2.
- Islahi, Abdul Azim (1988). Economic Concepts of Ibn Taimiyah. The Islamic Foundation. ISBN 978-0-86037-665-1.
- James, David (1983). The Arab Book. Chester Beatty Library.
- Johnson, Amy J. (2005). "Cairo". In Shillington, Kevin (ed.). Encyclopedia of African History 3-Volume Set. Routledge. ISBN 978-1-135-45670-2.
- Joinville, Jean (1807). Memoirs of John lord de Joinville. Gyan Books.
- King, David A. (1999). World-Maps for Finding the Direction and Distance to Mecca. Brill. ISBN 978-90-04-11367-1.
- Levanoni, Amalia (1995). A Turning Point in Mamluk History: The Third Reign of Al-Nāṣir Muḥammad Ibn Qalāwūn (1310–1341). Brill. ISBN 978-90-04-10182-1.
- McCarthy, Justin (2014). The Ottoman Turks: An Introductory History to 1923. Routledge. ISBN 978-1-317-89048-5.
- McGregor, Andrew James (2006). A Military History of Modern Egypt: From the Ottoman Conquest to the Ramadan War. Greenwood Publishing Group. ISBN 978-0-2759-8601-8.
- Muslu, Cihan Yüksel (2014). The Ottomans and the Mamluks: Imperial Diplomacy and Warfare in the Islamic World. I.B. Tauris. ISBN 978-0-85773-580-5.
- Nickel, Helmut (1972). "A Mamluk Axe". In Ettinghausen, Richard (ed.). Islamic Art in the Metropolitan Museum of Art. Metropolitan Museum of Art. pp. 213–226. ISBN 978-0-87099-111-0.
- Nicolle, David (2014). Mamluk 'Askari 1250–1517. Osprey Publishing. ISBN 978-1-78200-929-0.
- Northrup, Linda (1998a). From Slave to Sultan: The Career of Al-Manṣūr Qalāwūn and the Consolidation of Mamluk Rule in Egypt and Syria (678–689 A.H./1279–1290 A.D.). Franz Steiner. ISBN 978-3-515-06861-1.
- Northrup, Linda S. (1998b). "The Bahri Mamluk Sultanate". In Petry, Carl F. (ed.). The Cambridge History of Egypt, Vol. 1: Islamic Egypt 640–1517. Cambridge University Press. ISBN 978-0-521-06885-7.
- Paine, Lincoln (2015). The Sea and Civilization: A Maritime History of the World. Knopf Doubleday Publishing. ISBN 978-1-101-97035-5.
- Petry, Carl F. (1981). The Civilian Elite of Cairo in the Later Middle Ages. Princeton University Press. ISBN 978-1-4008-5641-1.
- Petry, Carl F. (1993). Twilight of Majesty: The Reigns of the Mamlūk Sultans Al-Ashrāf Qāytbāy and Qanṣūh Al-Ghawrī in Egypt. University of Washington Press. ISBN 978-0-295-97307-4.
- Petry, Carl F. (1998). "The Military Institution and Innovation in the Late Mamluk Period". In Petry, Carl F. (ed.). The Cambridge History of Egypt, Vol. 1: Islamic Egypt, 640–1517. Cambridge University Press. ISBN 978-0-521-06885-7.
- Petry, Carl F. (2022). The Mamluk Sultanate: A History. Cambridge University Press. ISBN 978-1-108-47104-6.
- Poliak, A. N. (January 1937). "Some Notes on the Feudal System of the Mamlūks". Journal of the Royal Asiatic Society of Great Britain & Ireland. 69 (1): 97–107. doi:10.1017/S0035869X00096179. ISSN 0035-869X.
- Popper, William (1955). Egypt and Syria Under the Circassian Sultans, 1382–1468 A.D.: Systematic Notes to Ibn Taghrî Birdî's Chronicles of Egypt, Volume 1. University of California Press.
- Powell, Eve M. Trout (2012). Tell This in My Memory: Stories of Enslavement from Egypt, Sudan, and the Ottoman Empire. Stanford University Press. ISBN 978-0-8047-8375-0.
- Rabbat, Nasser (2001). "Representing the Mamluks in Mamluk Historical Writing". In Kennedy, Hugh N. (ed.). The Historiography of Islamic Egypt: (c. 950–1800). Brill. ISBN 978-90-04-11794-5.
- Rabbat, Nasser O. (1995). The Citadel of Cairo: A New Interpretation of Royal Mameluk Architecture. Brill. ISBN 978-90-04-10124-1.
- Raymond, André (1993). Le Caire (in French). Fayard. ISBN 978-2-213-02983-2.
- Rodenbeck, Max (1999). Cairo: The City Victorious. Cairo: American University in Cairo Press. ISBN 0-679-44651-6.
- Salibi, Kamal (1967). "Northern Lebanon Under the Dominance of Ġazīr (1517–1591)". Arabica. 14 (2): 144–166. doi:10.1163/157005867X00029. JSTOR 4055631.
- Sanders, Paula (2008). Creating Medieval Cairo: Empire, Religion, and Architectural Preservation in Nineteenth-century Egypt. American University in Cairo Press. ISBN 978-977-416-095-0.
- Setton, Kenneth M. (1969). The Later Crusades, 1189–1311. Wisconsin: University of Wisconsin Press. ISBN 978-0-299-04844-0.
- Sharon, M. (1995). "A New Fâṭimid Inscription from Ascalon and Its Historical Setting". 'Atiqot. 26: 61–86. JSTOR 23457057.
- van Steenbergen, Jo (2005). "Identifying a Late Medieval Cadastral Survey of Egypt". In Vermeulen, Urbain; van Steenbergen, Jo (eds.). Egypt and Syria in the Fatimid, Ayyubid and Mamluk Eras IV. Peeters Publishers. ISBN 978-90-429-1524-4.
- Stilt, Kristen (2011). Islamic Law in Action: Authority, Discretion, and Everyday Experiences in Mamluk Egypt. Oxford University Press. ISBN 978-0-19-960243-8.
- Streusand, Douglas E. (2018). Islamic Gunpowder Empires: Ottomans, Safavids, and Mughals. Routledge. ISBN 978-0-429-96813-6.
- Teule, Herman G. B. (2013). "Introduction: Constantinople and Granada, Christian-Muslim Interaction 1350–1516". In Thomas, David; Mallett, Alex (eds.). Christian-Muslim Relations. A Bibliographical History, Volume 5 (1350–1500). Brill. ISBN 978-90-04-25278-3.
- Turan, Fikret (2007). "The Mamluks and Their Acceptance of Oghuz Turkish as Literary Language: Political Maneuver or Cultural Aspiration?". Turcologica. 69: 37–47.
- Van Steenbergen, Jo (2021). "Nomen Est Omen: David Ayalon, the Mamluk Sultanate, and the Reign of the Turks". In Levanoni, Amalia (ed.). Egypt and Syria under Mamluk Rule: Political, Social and Cultural Aspects. Brill. ISBN 978-90-04-45971-7.
- Varlik, Nükhet (2015). Plague and Empire in the Early Modern Mediterranean World: The Ottoman Experience, 1347–1600. Cambridge University Press. ISBN 978-1-316-35182-6.
- Welsby, Derek (2002). The Medieval Kingdoms of Nubia: Pagans, Christians and Muslims Along the Middle Nile. British Museum. ISBN 978-0-7141-1947-2.
- Williams, Caroline (2018). Islamic Monuments in Cairo: The Practical Guide (7th ed.). American University in Cairo Press. ISBN 978-977-416-855-0.
- Winter, Michael (1998). "The Re-Emergence of the Mamluks Following the Ottoman Conquest". In Philipp, Thomas; Haarmann, Ulrich (eds.). The Mamluks in Egyptian Politics and Society. Cambridge University Press. ISBN 978-0-521-59115-7.
- Yosef, Koby (2012). "Dawlat al-atrāk or dawlat al-mamālīk? Ethnic Origin or Slave Origin as the Defining Characteristic of the Ruling Élite in the Mamlūk Sultanate". Jerusalem Studies in Arabic and Islam. 39. Hebrew University of Jerusalem: 387–410.
- Yosef, Koby (2013). "The Term Mamlūk and Slave Status during the Mamluk Sultanate". Al-Qanṭara. 34 (1). Consejo Superior de Investigaciones Científicas: 7–34. doi:10.3989/alqantara.2013.001.
