= Fakhr al-Din al-Qibti =

Egyptian Emir and Nazir al-Guyush (1261–1332)

Emir Fakhr al-Din al-Qibti
- Native name: فخر الدين القبطي (Egyptian Arabic); Ϥⲉϧⲣ Ⲉⲗⲇⲓⲛ ⲡⲣⲉⲙⲛⲕⲩⲡⲧⲓ (Coptic)
- Born: 1261 likely Cairo, Egyptian Mamluk Sultanate
- Died: 1332 (aged 70–71) Cairo, Egyptian Mamluk Sultanate
- Allegiance: Egyptian Mamluk Sultanate
- Branch: Egyptian army
- Rank: Nazir al-Guyush (Supervisor of armies)

Mahammad bin Fadlallah al-Qibti (Egyptian Arabic: محمد بن فضل الله القبطي; Coptic: Ⲙⲟϩⲁⲙⲙⲉⲧ ⲥⲉⲛϤⲉⲇⲗ Ⲁⲗⲗⲁϩ ⲡⲣⲉⲙⲛⲕⲩⲡⲧⲓ; 1261 – 1332), commonly known as Fakhr al-Din al-Qibti was the Egyptian Supervisor of the armies (Nazir al-Guyush) in the Egyptian Mamluk Sultanate and second in command after the Sultan of Egypt al-Nasir Mahammad bin Qalawun.

== Early life ==
He was born in the year 1261 AD (659 AH) into an Egyptian Christian family. He entered the Egyptian Royal Office/Court (al-Diwan al-Sultani) in his youth, then after a while he converted to Islam and called himself Mahammad, and was nicknamed Fakhr al-Din for the work he would perform in his life to serve the people and the Islamic religion. Mahammad bin Fadlallah al-Qibti proved highly competent in his work in the Royal Court until he began to rise through the ranks until he assumed the position of Supervisor of the Egyptian Armies during the reign of Sultan al-Nasir Mahammad bin Qalawun.

== Career ==
At the beginning, he was the Mamluk scribe (Katib al-Mamalik) until Baha al-Din al-Hilli died, so he took charge of the army in his place, and contacted the service of al-Nasir Mahammad, who was angry with him when he came from al-Karak the third time and decided to appoint Qutb al-Din Ibn Shaykh al-Salamiyya in his place and took four hundred thousand dirhams from him, in Rabi' al-Thani in 712 AH. After a few months, he was returned to his job and ordered to return what was taken from him. He said: “Khund, I left it for you and I want to build a mosque for you in it.” So he built the new mosque for him.

He inspired Sultan al-Nasir Mahammad to dismiss the representative of the Sultanate (Na'ib al-Saltana), Arghun al-Nasiri, in 1327 AD (727 AH). Arghun, the representative, hated him, so Fakhr Al-Din continued to work on him until he went to the Levant. He said to al-Nasir, “One day, kings will be killed by their representatives.” Al-Nasir imagined that Arghun was going to do that, so when he returned, he sent him as a representative in Aleppo. It is said that When Fakhr al-Din died, al-Nasir jokingly said: “For fifteen years, he did not let me do what I want.” Fakhr al-Din was also behind the overthrow of vizier Maghalatawi al-Jamali in 1329 AD (729 AH), and he tempted al-Nasir to suspend these two positions so that he could assume their tasks and powers in addition to his position as the Supervisor of the armies, and to become the one relied upon in matters of state after the Sultan.

During Fakhr al-Din al-Qibti's tenure in office, he began doing good deeds throughout the Sultanate and serving the Egyptian nation with all sincerity. He built a large number of mosques and madrasas (schools), a bimaristan (large hospital), and a school in Nablus, Palestine. He built a second bimaristan in Ramla, Palestine. This is in addition to his mosques and madrasas in Cairo and other cities in Egypt, the most famous of which is his mosque on Roda Island in Cairo. Until Emir Fakhr al-Din al-Qibti became the most powerful man in the Egyptian Mamluk Sultanate without a dispute, as Fakhr al-Din al-Qibti was loved by all the people, and feared by Sultan al-Nasir Mahammad himself, so Sultan Mahammad could not make a decision without referring to Fakhr al-Din. If Fakhr al-Din rejects the decision, the Sultan returns his decision immediately. In one of the situations that indicates this, an emir asked Sultan Muhammad to give him a fief, and the Sultan said to him, “If Ibn Qalawun had written, the judge Fakhr al-Din will not give you.” Fakhr al-Din al-Qibti was the closest man to The Sultan and the most loyal of them, next to the leader Ibrahim bin Shaddad, the Muqadam al-Dawla (close to modern-day interior minister), who also has rural Egyptian origins too.

Emir Fakhr al-Din al-Qibti was a very devout Muslim. He performed Hajj (pilgrimage to Mecca) 10 times, went to Jerusalem often, and visited its sanctities This is in addition to the large number of mosques, schools, and hospitals that he built throughout the Sultanate, especially Egypt and Palestine.

Emir Fakhr al-Din al-Qibti died in 1332 AD during the lifetime of al-Nasir Mahammad ibn Qalawun, who held a magnificent funeral for him.

== Legacy ==
The historian Ibn Hajar al-Asqalani says about Fakhr al-Din al-Qibti:

“Many people in the Nasiri state benefited from him, including emirs, judges, scholars, righteous men, and soldiers. None of the emirs and holars were in his position with Sultan al-Nasir and he used to joke with him and share his secrets with him.”
