= Al-Nasir Muhammad =

Mamluk Sultan of Egypt from 1293 to 1294

Al-Nasir Muhammad الناصر محمد
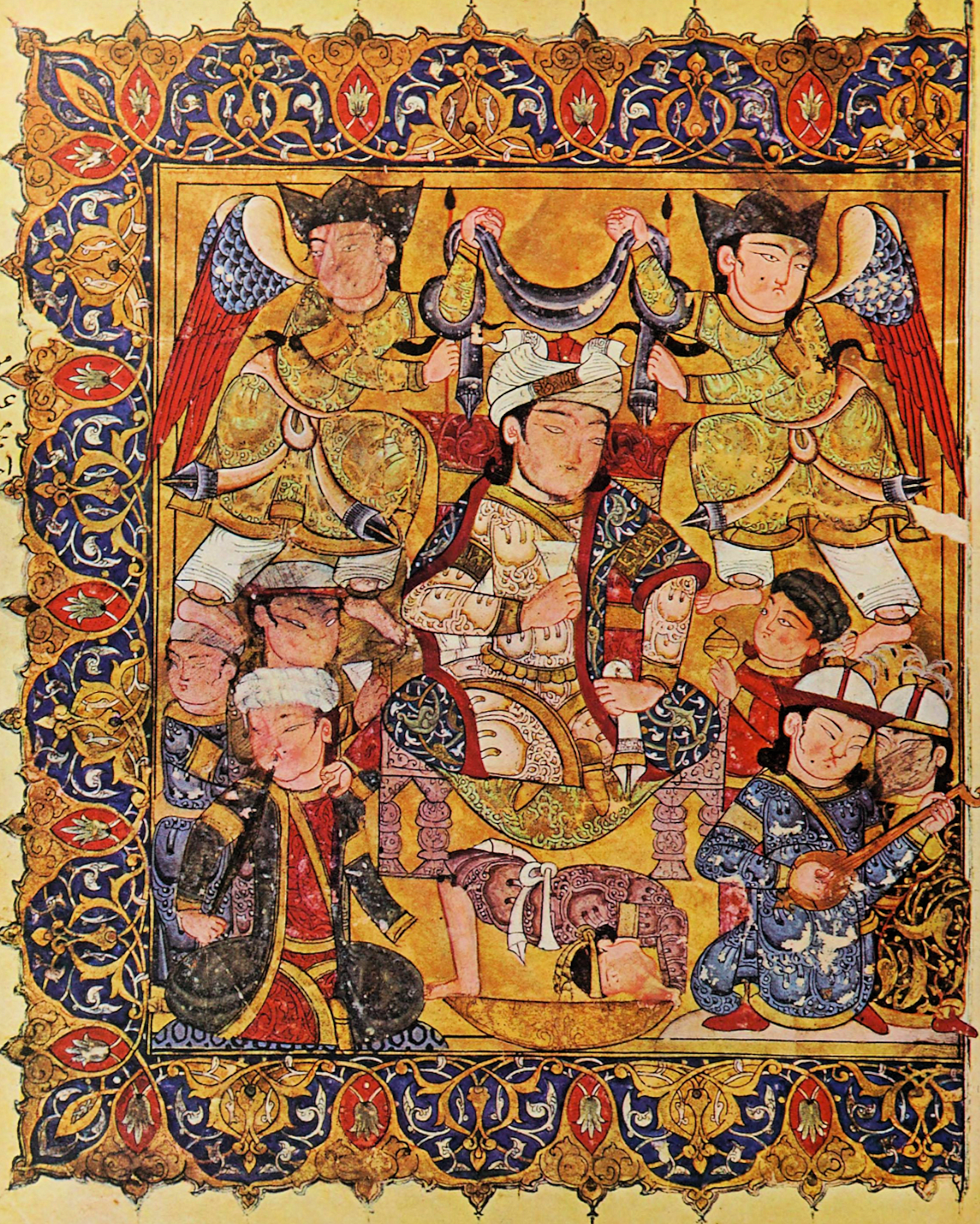
- Possible depiction of Al-Nasir Muhammad and his court. Maqamat of al-Hariri, 1334, probably Egypt. "In the paintings the facial cast of these [ruling] Turks is obviously reflected, and so are the special fashions and accoutrements they favored".

Sultan of Egypt
- 1st reign: December 1293 – December 1294
- Predecessor: Al-Ashraf Khalil
- Successor: Kitbugha
- Regent: Kitbugha
- 2nd reign: 16 January 1299 – March 1309
- Predecessor: Lajin
- Successor: Baybars II
- Regent: Baybars II and Sayf al-Din Salar
- 3rd reign: 5 March 1310 – 7 June 1341
- Predecessor: Baybars II
- Successor: Saif ad-Din Abu-Bakr
- Born: 16 Muḥarram 684/24 March 1285; Cairo, Mamluk Sultanate
- Died: 21 Dhū al-Ḥijja 741/7 June 1341 (age 56); Cairo Egypt
- Consorts: Khawand Ardukin; Tulunbay; Khawand Toghay; Qutlughmalik; Khawand Zadu; Narjis; Ardu; Bayad; Kuda
- Issue: Anuk; Ahmad; Abu Bakr; Ismail; Sha'ban; Ramadan; Hajji; Kujuk; Hasan; Salih; Husayn
Names
- Al-Malik an-Nasir Nasir ad-Din Abu'l Ma'ali Muhammad ibn Qalawun
- House: Qalawuni
- Dynasty: Bahri
- Father: Qalawun
- Mother: Ashlūn bint Shaktāy
- Religion: Sunni Islam

Al-Malik an-Nasir Nasir ad-Din Muhammad ibn Qalawun (Arabic: الملك الناصر ناصر الدين محمد بن قلاوون), commonly known as an-Nasir Muhammad (Arabic: الناصر محمد), or by his kunya: Abu al-Ma'ali (أبو المعالي) or as Ibn Qalawun (1285–1341) was the ninth Mamluk sultan of the Bahri dynasty who ruled Egypt between 1293–1294, 1299–1309, and 1310 until his death in 1341. During his first reign, he was overthrown by Kitbugha and al-Shuja‘i, and during his second reign by Baybars II and Sayf al-Din Salar. During his third reign, he had Baybars executed to suppress further insurgency.

An-Nasir appointed loyal non-Mamluks to senior military positions and removed officers whose loyalty he doubted. He annulled taxes and surcharges imposed on commoners for the benefit of the emirs and officials. He appointed Emir Ibn al-Waziri as the head of the Court of Justice to fight corruption.

== Life ==
An-Nasir Muhammad was the third son of Sultan Qalawun and the brother of Sultan al-Ashraf Khalil. He was born in Cairo at Qal'at al-Jabal (Citadel of the Mountain). His father Qalawun was of Turkic origin from a Kipchak tribe, and his mother Ašlūn was the daughter of a Mongol notable named Šaktāy. Qalawun received the news of an-Nasir's birth during his siege of Margat on the coast of the Levant. An-Nasir Muhammad was raised and behaved in Mongol fashion until the age of 29, until he had a change of mood after an illness in 1315, which led him and his followers to "shave their heads [...] and give up their flowing locks".

An-Nasir Muhammad married a Turkic woman Khawand Toghay, who started as his slave but was freed by him. She gave birth to Prince Anuk.

His reign can be divided mainly into three phases, as he was deposed once and abdicated once during his reign.

== First reign ==
After the assassination of al-Ashraf Khalil in December 1293, he was installed, aged 8 years, as sultan with Zayn-ad-Din Kitbugha as the regent and vice-sultan and Emir ‘Alam al-Din Sanjar al-Shuja‘i al-Mansuri (عَلَمُ الدِّينِ سَنْجَرُ الشُّجَاعِيُّ المَنْصُورِيُّ, romanised: ʿAlam ad-Dīn Sanǧar aš-Šuǧāʿī al-Manṣūrī) as vizier. As an-Nasir Muhammad was only 9 years old, he was a sultan in name only. Kitbugha and Sanjar al-Shuja‘i were the actual rulers of Egypt. The two emirs, Kitbugha, who was of Mongol origin, and al-Shuja‘i, who was of Turkic origin, were rivals and did not get on with each other. Al-Shuja‘i, with the support of the Burji Mamluks, planned to arrest Kitbugha and assassinate his emirs but Kitbugha laid siege to the Citadel and the conflict ended with the murder of al-Shuja‘i and the removal of the Burjis from the Citadel.

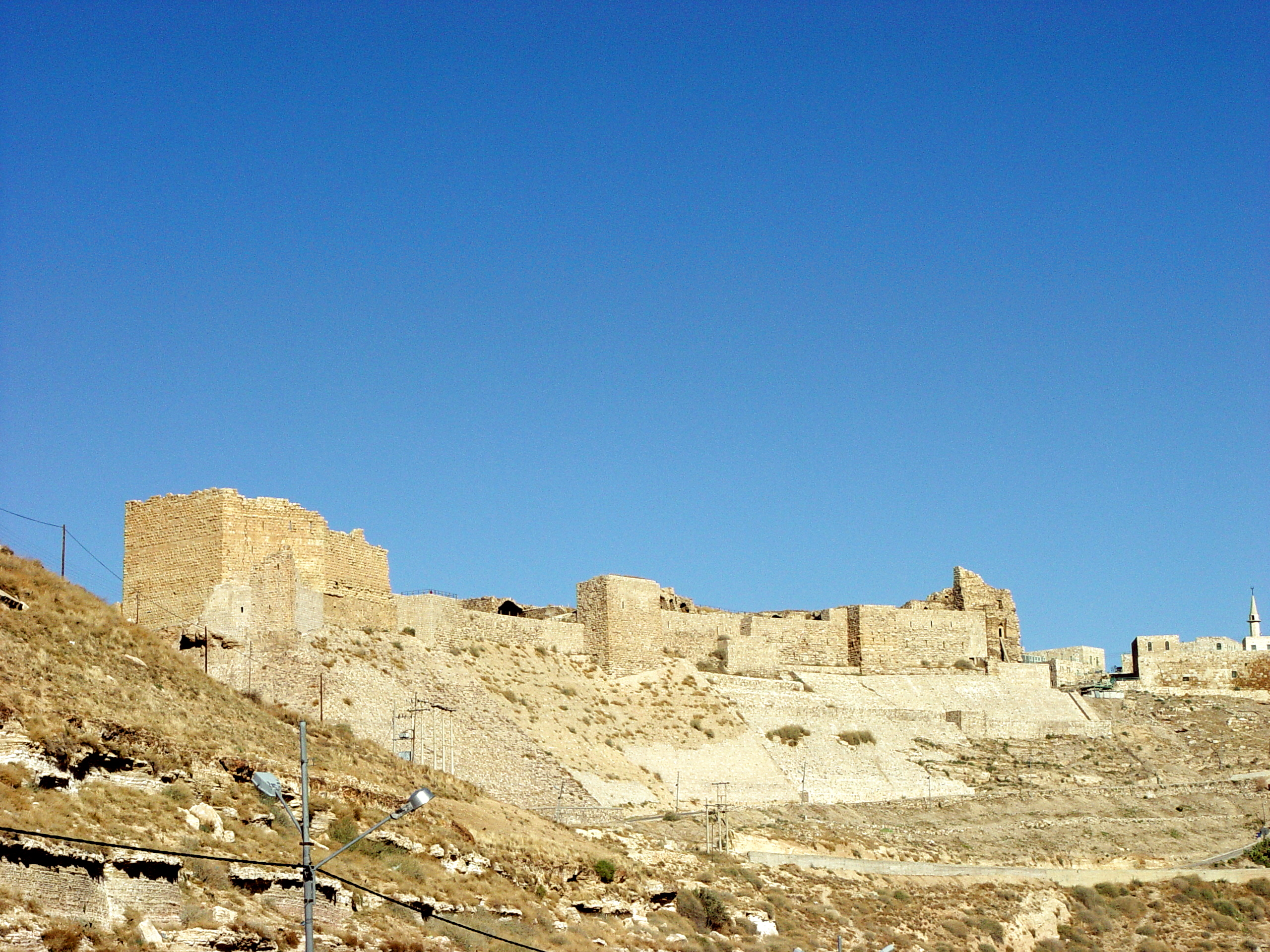
Al-Karak, place of exile of An-Nasir Muhammad

When Emir Hussam ad-Din Lajin, who had fled after the murder of al-Ashraf Khalil, returned to Cairo, the Burji Mamluks, who were known as the al-Mamalik al-Ashrafiyah Khalil (Mamluks of al-Ashraf Khalil) and who were removed from the citadel by Kitbugha, rebelled and went on a rampage in Cairo because Lajin had not been arrested and punished for his involvement in the murder of their benefactor Sultan al-Ashraf Khalil. The Ashrafiyah were defeated and many of them were killed and executed. Lajin convinced Kitbugha to depose an-Nasir Muhammad and install himself as sultan after warning that the Ashrafiyah and an-Nasir would seek revenge for the murder of Khalil in which Kitbugha had been involved. Kitbugha deposed an-Nasir and installed himself sultan with Lajin as his vice-sultan. An-Nasir, who was by now 10 years old, was removed with his mother to another section in the palace where they stayed until they were sent to al-Karak thus ending the first reign of an-Nasir.

== Second reign ==
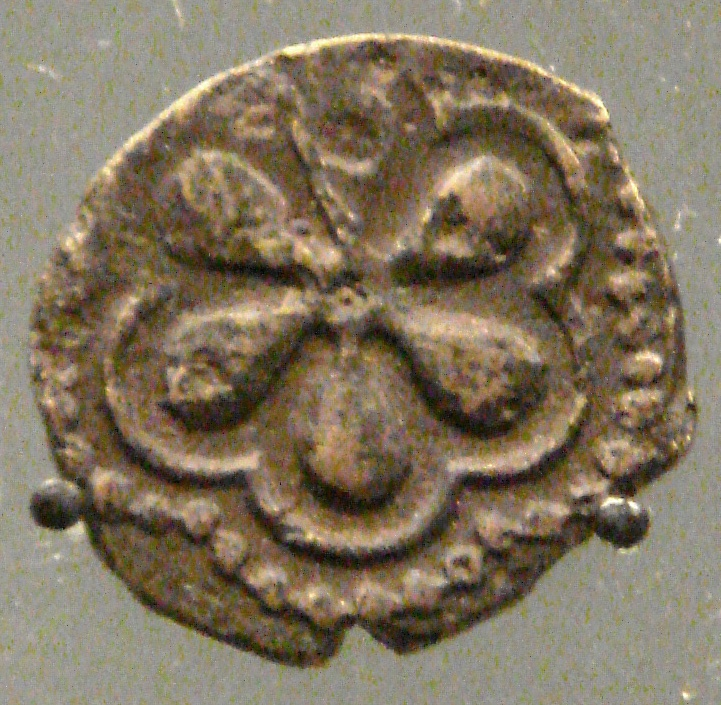
Al-Nasir Muhammad copper fals, 1310–1341. British Museum

In 1296 Kitbugha was deposed by his vice-Sultan Lajin and he fled to Syria and died in 1297 while holding the post of the governor of Hama. Lajin ruled as a sultan until he was murdered with his vice-sultan Mangu-Temur in 1299 by a group of Emirs led by Saif al-Din Kirji. After the murder of Lajin and his vice-Sultan, the Emirs, including Baibars al-Jashnakir (Baibars II), assembled and decided to call an-Nasir Muhammad from Karak and re-install him as Sultan with Emir Taghji as Vice-Sultan. However, the recall of an-Nasir was delayed for some time as Emir Kirji, who murdered Lajin, and the Ashrafiyah Emirs insisted that Taghji should become the sultan and Kirji be the vice-sultan. At last, an-Nasir was recalled and he arrived with his mother in Cairo amid widespread celebration by its population. An-Nasir, who was by now 14 years old, was re-installed with Sayf al-Din Salar, who was an Oirat Mongol as vice-Sultan and Baibars al-Jashnakir who was a Circassian as Ostadar. An-Nasir was, again, a nominal Sultan, with the actual rulers being Salar and Baibars.

The Burji Mamluks became more powerful during the second reign of an-Nasir. They imposed taxes on people who needed their services or their protection. This official bribery was called "Himayah". The rivals of the Burjis, who were led by Baibars al-Jashnakir, were the Salihiyya and the Mansuriyya Emirs led by Salar and al-Ashrafiyy led by Emir Barlghi.

Early in the second reign of an-Nasir, a Bedouin rebellion in Upper Egypt was crushed and the army "slew mercilessly every Bedouin in the land and carried off their women captive". The army was led by the Emirs Salar and Baibars.

=== The Battle of Wadi al-Khaznadar ===
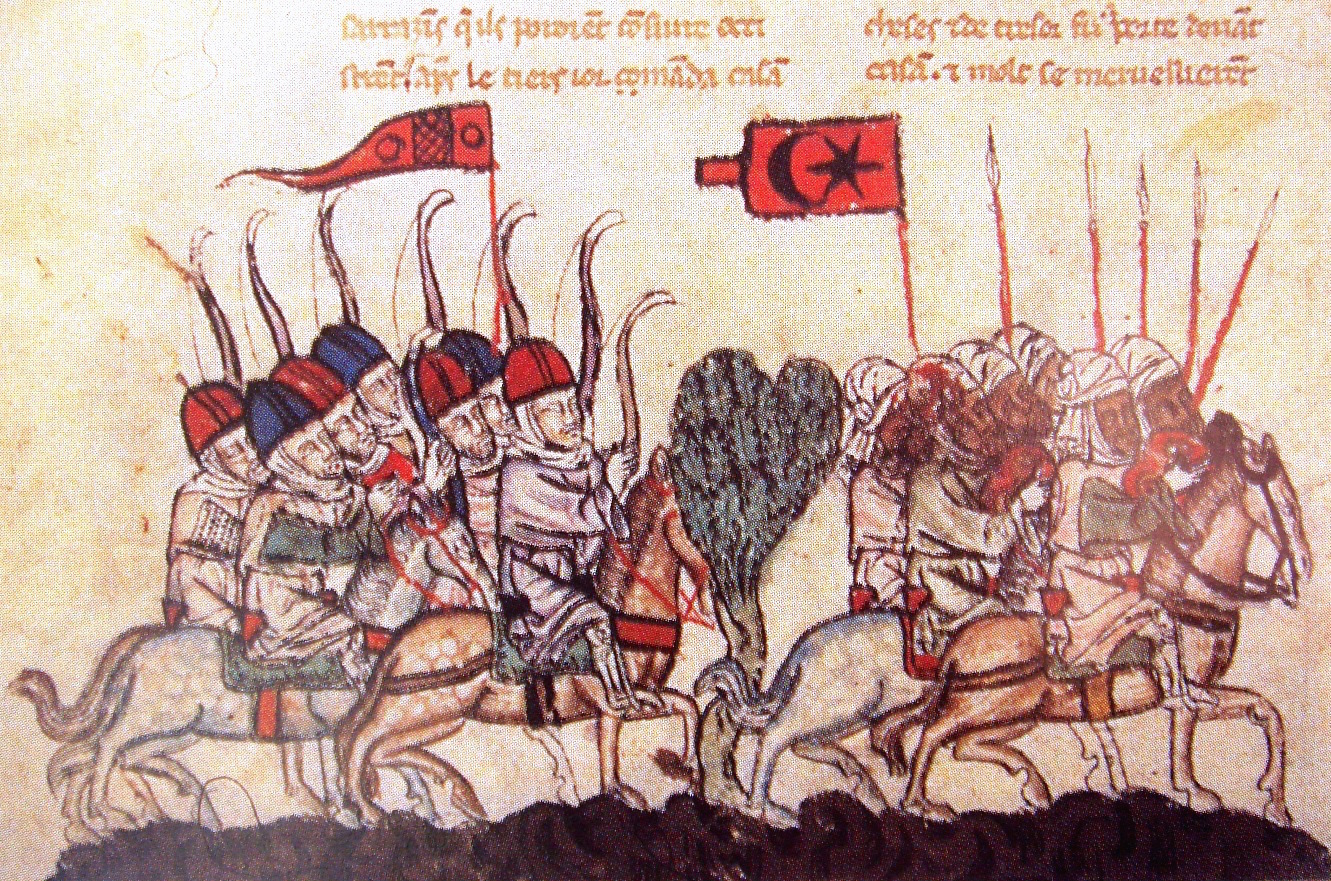
Battle of Wadi al-Khaznadar. Miniature from the 14th century manuscript of Fleur des histoires de la terre d'Orient by Hayton of Corycus. Bibliothèque nationale de France

News reached Cairo that Ghazan of the Ilkhanate was preparing to attack the Levant with a big army and about 30 Crusade ships arrived in Beirut. The emirs decided to send forces from Egypt to Syria. While the crusader ships were destroyed by a storm before the crusaders could get ashore, Ghazan, after arriving in Baghdad had to change his plan after one of his commanders named Solamish Ben Afal fled to Egypt and asked for help to fight him.

In 1299 an-Nasir led the Egyptian Army to Syria to take on the army of Ghazan. While the Sultan was on his way to Syria, some Oirats conspired with a mamluk of the Sultan to kill Baibars al-Jashnakir and Salar in order to bring Kitbugha who was in Hama back to power. The sultan's mamluk attacked Baibars and tried to kill him but he was himself killed. The Oirats attacked the Dihliz of the Sultan but they were stopped in a way that made Salar and Baibars think the Sultan was involved in the conspiracy. The Oirats were arrested and punished and the mamluks who were involved were sent to the castle of Al-Karak.

The army of an-Nasir (about 20,000 soldiers) clashed with Ghazan's army (about 12,000 soldiers) in a battle that became known as the Battle of Wadi al-Khazandar. An-Nasir's army was defeated with relatively low casualties (200 to 1000 men) after inflicting major casualties on Ghazan's army (about 2500 casualties). An-Nasir's forces retreated to Homs followed by the army of Ghazan. An-Nasir left for Egypt and Ghazan took Homs. Much of the population of Damascus fled towards Egypt. The leaders of Damascus appealed to Ghazan not to kill the remaining population of the city. Ghazan arrived at the outskirts of Damascus and his soldiers looted the city. Damascus, with the exception of its citadel, submitted to the Mongol commander Qubjuq and Ghazan's name was mentioned during the Friday prayer at the main mosque of Damascus as: al-Sultan al-Azam Sultan al-Islam wa al-Muslimin Muzaffar al-Dunya wa al-Din Mahmud Ghazan ("The Greatest Sultan, the Sultan of Islam and of Muslims, the victorious in life and in faith, Mahmud Ghazan). The Mongols kept looting Syrian villages, towns and Damascus itself.

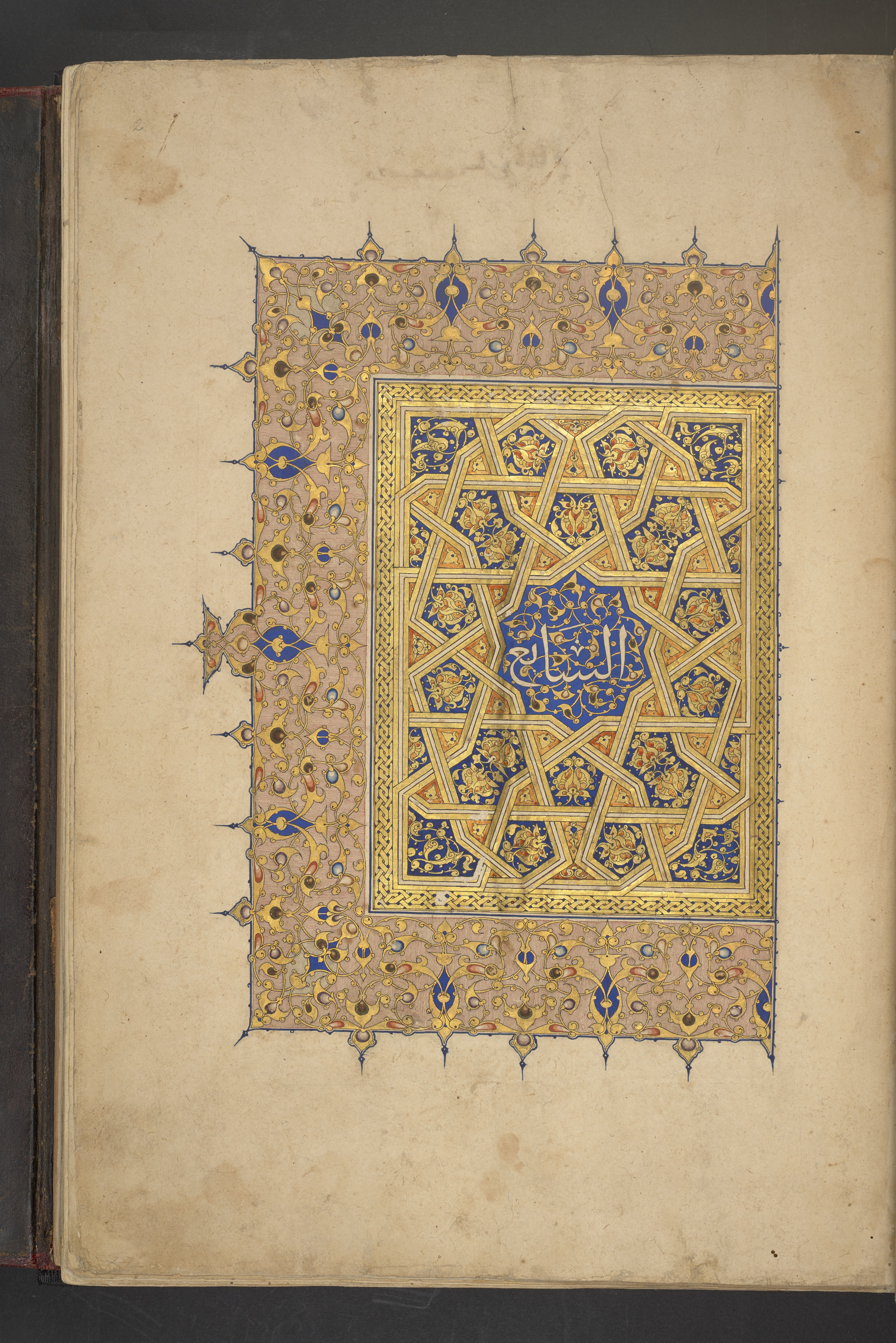
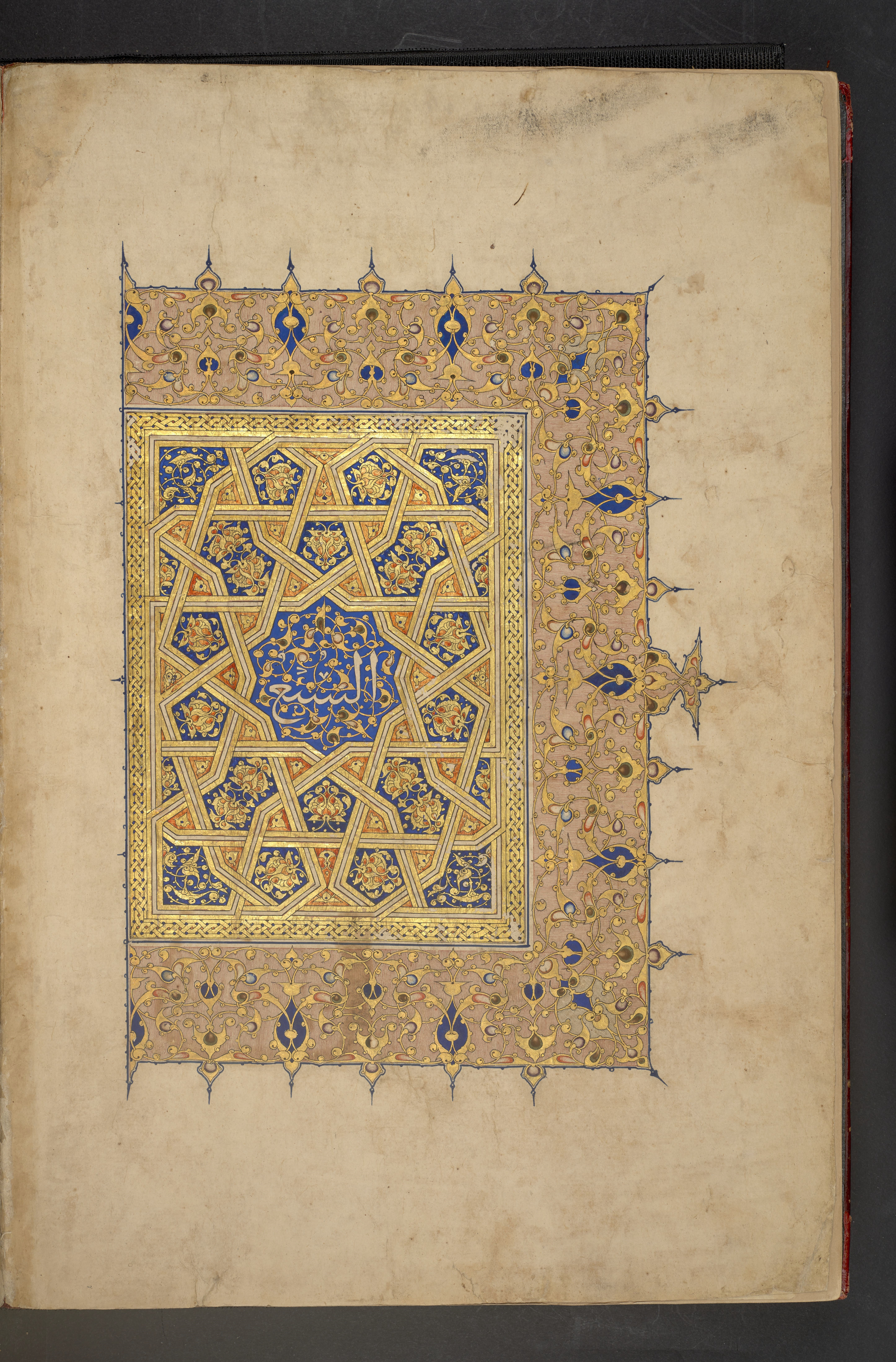
Illuminated frontispiece from the Qur'an commissioned by the emir Baibars al-Jashnakir in 1304. From the British Library.

In Egypt, the defeated soldiers of an-Nasir kept arriving in disorder. The deposed Sultan Kitbugha, who was in Syria, also fled to Egypt. Cairo became overcrowded as many Syrian refugees fled there. An-Nasir and the Emirs began to prepare for a new march to the Levant. Money, horses and arms were collected from all over Egypt. An attempt to reuse an old fatwa which was issued during the reign of Sultan Qutuz which obliged each Egyptian to pay one dinar to support the army failed. Therefore, it was decided that the Egyptian people should pay voluntarily and not by force of law. But suddenly the news arrived in Cairo that Ghazan had left the Levant after he had installed two of his commanders as his deputies there. An-Nasir sent letters to Ghazan's deputies asking them to submit to him and they agreed. Kitbugha was granted the post of the governor of Hama and Salar and Baibars travelled with an army to the Levant to liquidate the remaining forces of Ghazan. The Druze who attacked and looted an-Nasir's soldiers during their retreat to Egypt were attacked at their strongholds and they were forced to give back the weapons and the properties which they had taken from the retreating soldiers. The submitted deputies arrived in Egypt and were received by an-Nasir. The name of Sultan an-Nasir was mentioned again at the Syrian mosques. He was again the sovereign of the Levant.

In addition to Mongol threats in the Levant, the second reign of an-Nasir also witnessed disturbances inside Egypt. There were religious riots in Cairo and rebellions in Upper Egypt which were harshly suppressed. In 1301 parts of Armenian Cilicia were looted and Sis was attacked by an-Nasir's forces led by his Emirs as the Armenians tried to support Ghazan. In 1302 the crusader-held island of Arwad was attacked and ransacked because the crusaders had been using it as a base for attacks on Muslim shipping.

In 1308 an-Nasir permitted the Georgians to celebrate on Calvary and probably in that year allowed two of them to stay closed in at the Church of the Holy Sepulchre.

=== The Battle of Marj al-Saffar ===
In 1303 Ghazan's army crossed the Euphrates River and marched towards Syria. The Syrians fled from Aleppo and Hama to Damascus. An Egyptian force led by Baibars Al-Jashnakir arrived in Damascus. The population of Damascus wanted to flee but they were warned that they would be killed and their money would be seized if they tried to do that. Ghazan's troops attacked Turcoman villages and took women and children as prisoners but the Sultan's forces led by his Emirs clashed with the Mongols and freed about 6000 Turkmen after they destroyed the Mongol force.

On 20 April, an-Nasir and the Caliph arrived in Syria from Egypt and while the Emirs were greeting them, news reached them that a Mongol army of 50,000 soldiers led by Qutlugh-Shah, the deputy of Ghazan, was approaching. An-Nasir and the Emirs decided to fight the Mongol forces at Marj al-Saffar. The Caliph who stood beside the sultan at the heart of the army exclaimed to the soldiers: "Warriors, do not worry about your Sultan but worry about your women and the religion of your Prophet."

A force of about 10,000 men led by Qutlugh-Shah attacked the right flank of an-Nasir's army but units led by Baibars and Salar gave their support and pushed Qutlugh-Shah back. There was confusion on the battleground as many thought that an-Nasir's army had been defeated when they saw the Mongols passing the right flank of an-Nasir's army. Qutlugh-Shah withdrew to a mountain also believing that he had won. But from his position on the mountain he saw the army of an-Nasir standing firm on the left flank and his soldiers were filling the field. Qutlugh-Shah was puzzled and asked an Egyptian Emir who was taken prisoner about the army that he was seeing. The Emir answered him that it was the army of the Sultan of Egypt. Qutlugh-Shah was shocked as he did not know that an-Nasir has arrived with the Egyptian army. When Qutlugh-Shah saw his army defeated and fleeing he too fled at sunset. Next morning Qutlugh-Shah returned to the battlefield but he was defeated again. His third offensive happened early in the morning of the third day but his army was utterly annihilated. Only a small number of the Mongols survived. When Ghazan heard about the defeat of his army it was said that he was so upset that he suffered a severe hemorrhage and he died a year later (11 May 1304). An-Nasir returned to Egypt to great celebrations. Cairo was decorated from Bab al-Nasr (Victory Gate) to Qal'at al-Jabal The prominent Egyptian Mamluk historian Baibars al-Dewadar was present at the battle of Marj al-Saffar.

=== Achievements and withdrawal ===
In 1304 Sis was raided again by an-Nasir's Emirs and a group of Mongols led by a prominent commander named Badr ad-Din Albaba were brought to Egypt and welcomed by an-Nasir in Cairo. Madrasah Al-Nasiryah had the gate of the Church of Saint Andrew installed which al-Ashraf Khalil had brought to Egypt in 1291 after reconquering Acre. In 1304 an-Nasir's son Ali was born.

By 1309 An-Nasir was no longer willing to be dominated by Salar and Baibars al-Jashnakir. He informed them that he was going to Mecca for a pilgrimage but, instead, he went to al-Karak and stayed there ending his second reign. But an-Nasir did not actually mean to resign. He knew he would not be able to rule while Baibars and Salar were in power as sooner or later they would depose him or even kill him. An-Nasir tried to arrest Baibars and Salar but when he failed he calculated that he would be able to make new alliances with the Sultanate deputies in the Levant who could offer him support against the two Emirs for a return later to Egypt. When an-Nasir refused to go back to Egypt, Baibars installed himself as the Sultan of Egypt with Salar as his vice-Sultan.

== Third reign ==
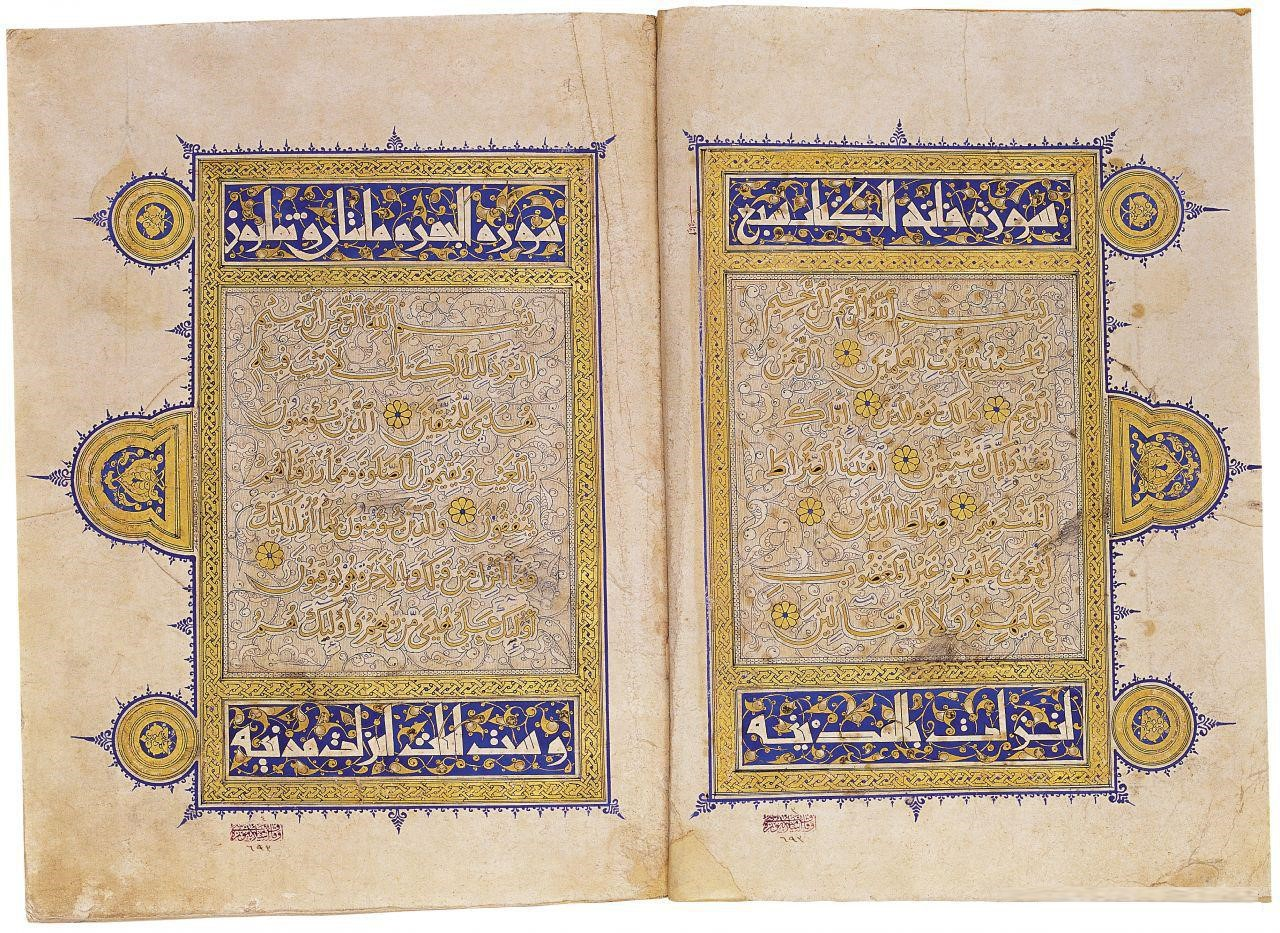
Opening double-page from the Qur'an commissioned by An-Nasir Muhammad. This manuscript was copied by Shadhi ibn Muhammad ibn Ayyub, great-grandson of Ayyubid An-Nasir Dawud. Cairo, December 1313. Turkish and Islamic Arts Museum

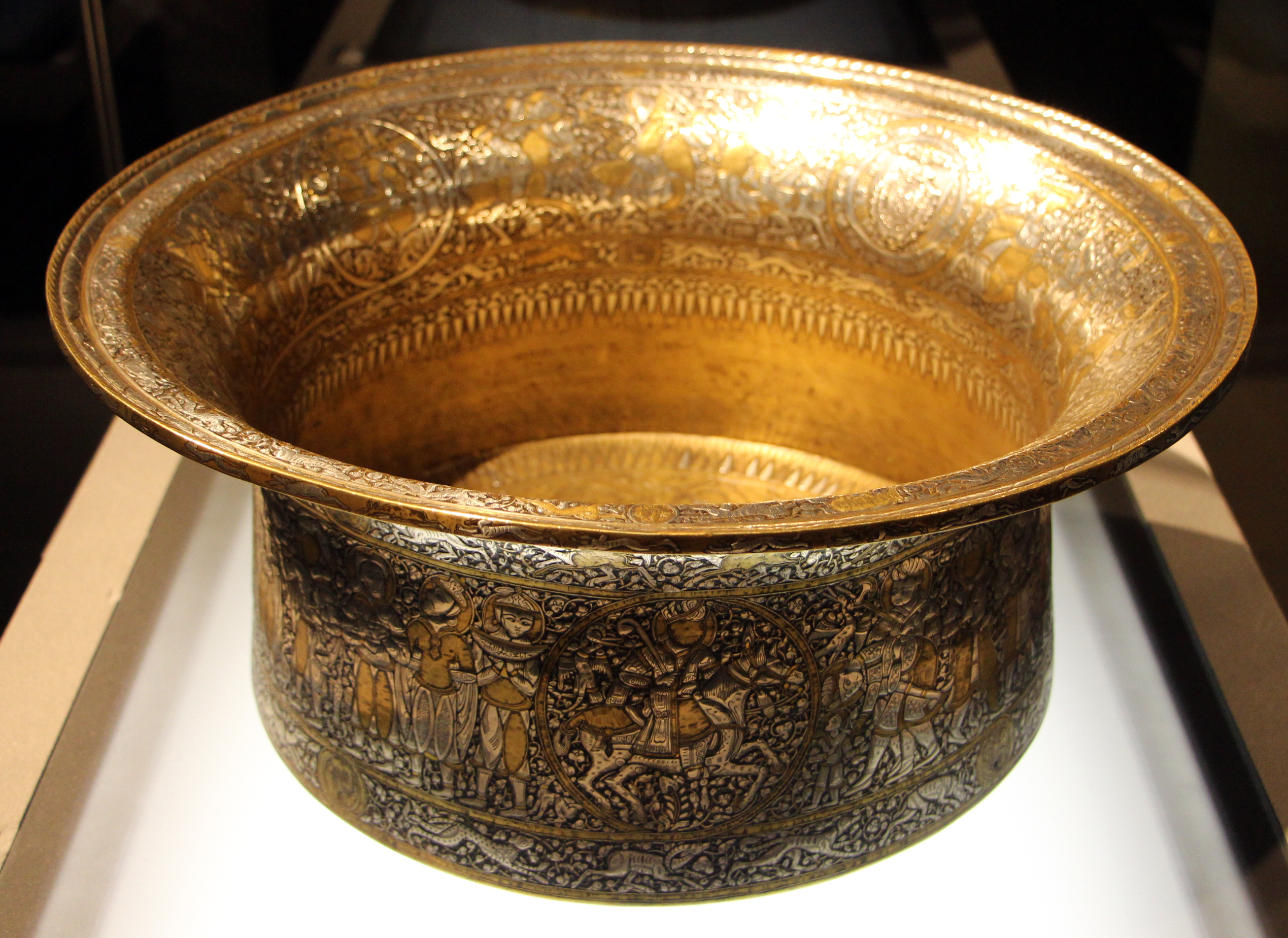
Baptistère de Saint Louis, basin from the reign of An-Nasir Muhammad, which from the 17th century was used as a baptismal font for French Kings. Louvre

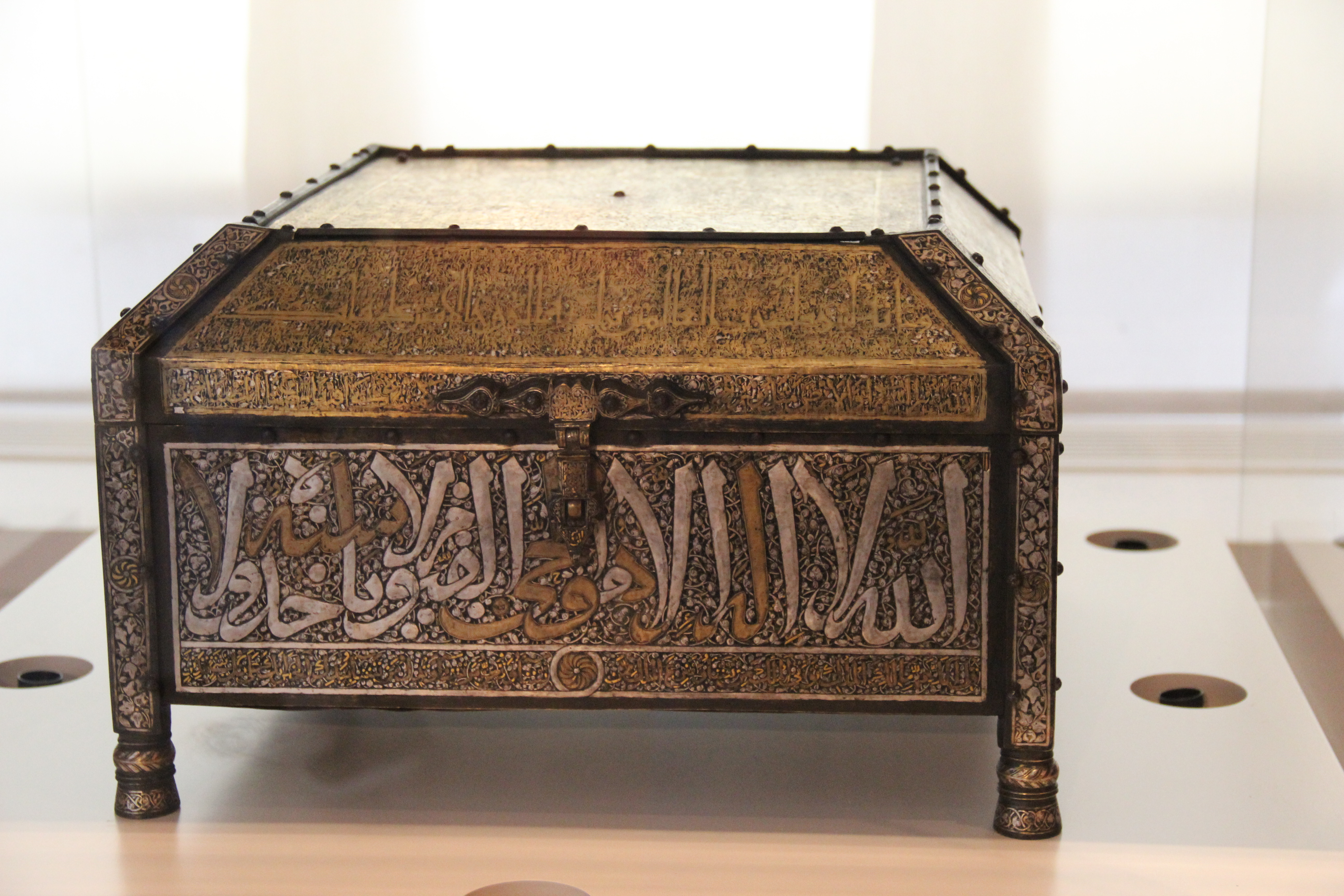
Qur'an Box commissioned by An-Nasir Muhammad. Cairo, c. 1330. Museum of Islamic Art, Berlin

Baibars al-Jashnakir ruled Egypt for ten months and 24 days. His reign was marked by social unrest and threats from the Mongols and the Crusaders. The population of Egypt, who hated him, demanded the return of their beloved Sultan an-Nasir Muhammad. Baibars was forced to step down and flee from the angry mob.

An-Nasir returned to Egypt. During his first reign he was dominated by Kitbugha and al-Shuja‘i, while during his second reign he was dominated by Baibars and Salar. An-Nasir, who was now 24 years old, was determined not to be dominated or deprived of his full rights as a sultan by any emir. An-Nasir executed Baibars and accepted the resignation of Salar as vice Sultan and replaced him with Baktmar al-Jukondar. Then after a year, he arrested Salar and he died shortly thereafter in prison. The Mamluks and properties of both Baibars and Salar were seized.

In 1310 the vice-Sultan Baktmar al-Jukondar and Emir Bikhtas conspired to overthrow an-Nasir and replace him with Emir Musa, the son of as-Salih Ali who was the son of Qalawun. Musa agreed to participate in the conspiracy, but the conspiracy was revealed to an-Nasir by an emir and both Bikhtas and Musa were arrested. The vice-Sultan Baktmar was arrested a year later after being accused of plotting to overthrow an-Nasir and take the throne for himself. Baibars al-Dewadar became the new vice-Sultan. Because of his experience with the Emirs and their plots, an-Nasir Muhammad became very suspicious and very sensitive to criticism. He even exiled the Caliph to Qus in 1338.

=== Crackdown on corruption ===
Slowly but systematically an-Nasir increased his power as sultan and took revenge on the emirs who had mistreated him in the past and on the emirs who plotted against him after his return to Egypt. He abolished a few official positions, seized the wealth and property of corrupt officials, discharged the Oirat Mongols from royal service and annulled the exceptional taxes and surcharges (Mikoos) which were imposed on the common people by the authorities and which enriched officials and made the emirs more powerful. He employed Emir Ibn al-Waziri, a man who was known to be tough on corruption, as the head of Dar al-Adl (Court of Justice) and every Monday the Sultan would listen to complaints from the common people against the officials and the emirs. He prohibited his governors from executing or physically punishing convicts without his permission and he shut an infamous prison near the Citadel. In 1314 he abolished the post of vice-Sultan. In 1315 he carried out a land survey to re-establish the amount of the taxes which the land owners and the landlords had to pay to the state.

=== Internal and external situations ===
During the third reign of an-Nasir Muhammad, Egypt did not witness any major external threats as both the Crusaders and the Mongols had been weakened by losses in battle and their internal conflicts. However, Mongol ruler Oljeitu besieged Mamluk fortresses but withdrew due to deadly summer heat in 1312–1313. In 1314 the city of Malatya was captured by Tankiz, the deputy of an-Nasir in the Levant. An-Nasir's forces launched raids on the Armenian Kingdom of Cilicia, and in 1316, the Mongols raided Aleppo with a small army, but the Turkomen confronted them, killed them, and sent their prisoners to Cairo, but matters did not develop into major wars.

In 1321, soldiers belonging to Egypt entered the city of Baghdad, which was at that time under the rule of the Ilkhanate. These soldiers had a royal order from al-Nasir Muhammad ordering them to close the Baghdad Bazaar, which was a place for bad deeds such as prostitution and drinking, and in a challenge to the authority of the Mongols in Baghdad, the soldiers closed the bazaar. One of al-Nasir Muhammad’s orders was that the women who worked in the bazaar should be pardoned and all of them should get married. This was in addition to his orders to throw away all the wine in the place. The historian Ibn Habib al-Halabi describes the scene of the pouring of wine on that day and says: “And the drink was spilled so that if it were poured into the Tigris River, it would flood Baghdad.” Prayers were made and the name of al-Nasir Muhammad was mentioned on the city's mosques minbars (pulpits).

In February 1321, there was a serious disturbance between the Egyptian Muslim and Christian communities which developed after a few Christian churches were destroyed simultaneously in various parts of Egypt. This was followed by a series of fires at mosques and other buildings in Cairo. A few Christians were arrested while trying to set fire to some buildings and mosques, and one of them admitted that some people gathered and made rags with oil and tar in them and distributed them to some people to start fires in retaliation for the attacks on some churches. An-Nasir ordered the summoning of the patriarch, who condemned what happened. Some Muslims were arrested and rioters on both sides were punished. The Crusader attack on Muslim countries led to the arousal of hostility at times between Muslims and local Christians in Muslim countries. In response to the persecution of the Christians in Egypt and the demolition of churches, the Ethiopian emperor Amda Seyon I wrote a letter to al-Nasir Muhammad in 1325 which threatened to divert the waters of the Nile River upstream if these actions did not stop. Al-Nasir Muhammad treated the emperor's envoys with contempt and dismissed them.

Though the economy of Egypt flourished during the third reign of an-Nasir, there were financial problems and a rise in prices caused by the circulation of underweight and alloyed coins. An-Nasir minted a few thousand new coins to replace the spurious coins.

=== Relationship of the Egypt with the outside world ===
Under an-Nasir the position of Egypt as a political power grew. Foreign delegations and kings' envoys with gifts visited Cairo frequently seeking the help and the friendship of an-Nasir. Among these visits were envoys from Pope John XXII and King Philip VI of France. The Papal envoys arrived in Cairo in June 1327 with a gift and a letter from the Pope who appealed to an-Nasir to treat the Christians well and to protect the Christian holy places and to stop his attacks against Sis. Those were the first envoys of a Pope to go to Egypt since the time of Sultan as-Salih Ayyub. In February 1330, King Philip VI sent a delegation of 120 men who appealed to an-Nasir to grant Philip the city of Jerusalem and surrounding areas along the Levantine Coast. An-Nasir reacted by insulting the French envoys and their King and ordered them to leave Egypt.

=== Public works ===
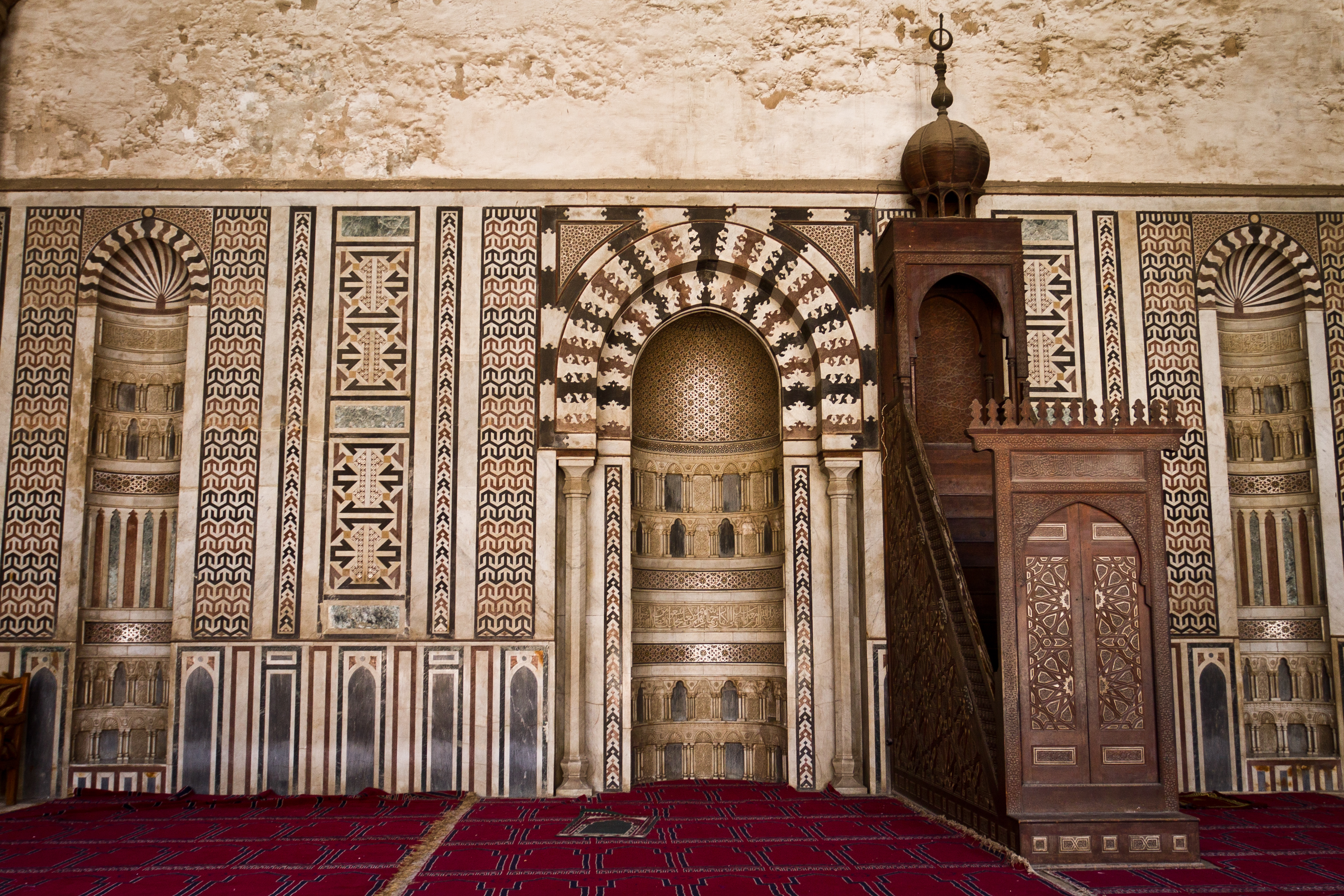
Interior of the Sultan an-Nasir Muhammad Mosque, featuring mihrab and minbar.

Al-Nasir Muhammad's long reign marked the apogee of Mamluk power and the high-water mark of culture in Egypt since Ptolemaic Alexandria. Extraordinary public works were set in motion. He redug once again the canal connecting Alexandria with the Nile: it was opened to traffic in 1311 and required workforces on a Pharaonic scale. Some of his major works in Cairo were the huge square that was called al-Midan al-Nasiri. He also carried out significant constructions and expansions in the Citadel, including the Qasr al-Ablaq (Striped Palace), the Great Iwan, a new Friday mosque, and the Citadel's aqueduct system. In addition, he built madrasas, including his funerary madrasa at Bayn al-Qasrayn, built public baths, and renovated more than thirty mosques, which added to Cairo's rich fabric of Islamic architecture. His own Madrasa on al-Muizz Street which stands until today was decorated with a Gothic arch brought in triumph from the ruined cathedral of Acre by his brother Khalil. He also added to his father's complex of structures Cairo's first sabil, a fountain for the use of all, especially welcome to the poor who might not have access to a well.

== Emblems and coins ==
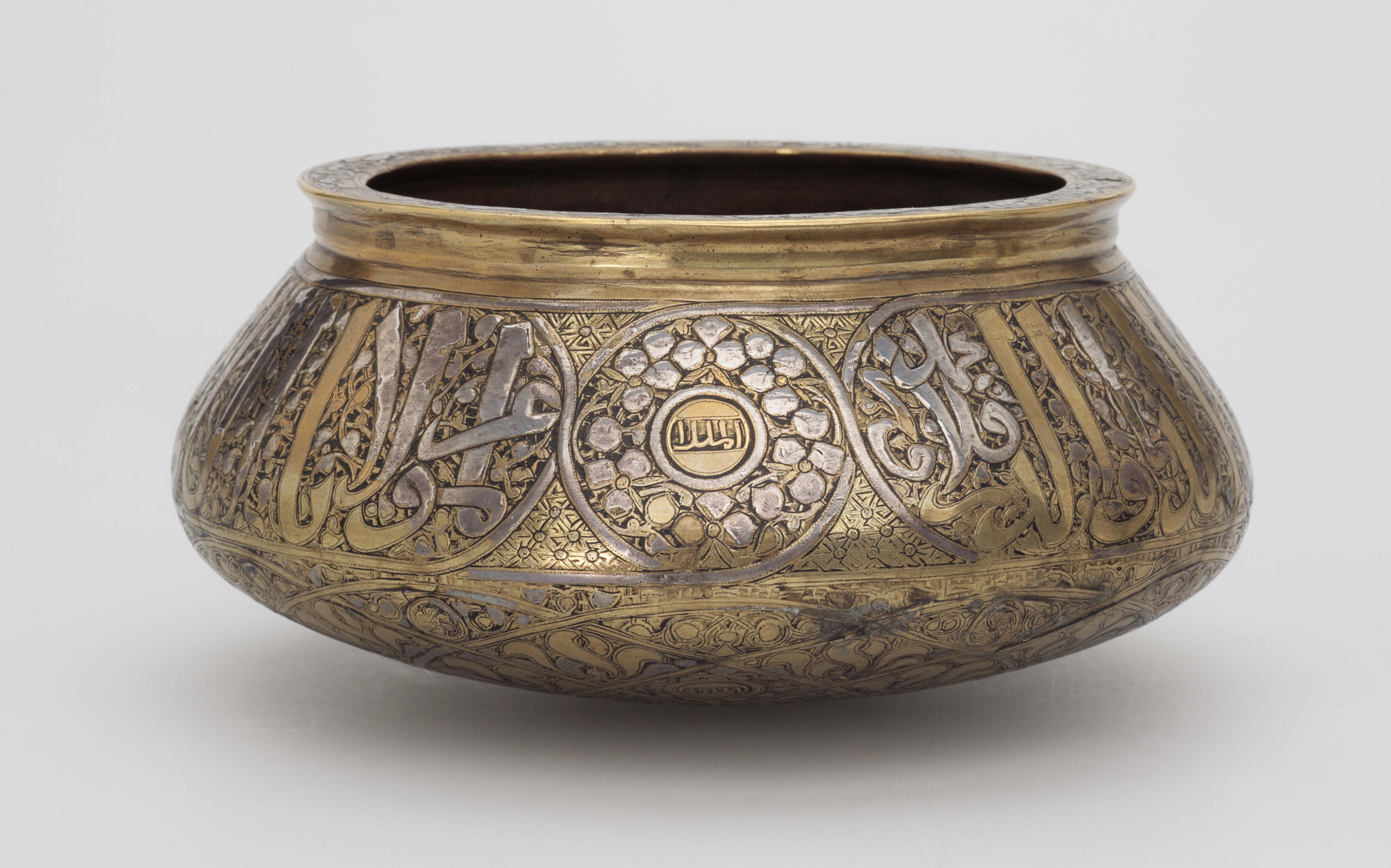
Brass bowl, inlaid with silver decorations, dedicated to al-Nasir Muhammad, Khalili Collection of Islamic Art

He had numerous emblems, apart from them were an eagle, flower, lily, Bundel (symbol of the Jomdar who was an official of the department at the Sultan's clothing).

There are no known emblems during his first reign. While in his second reign, coins had an-Nasir's name inscribed as al-Sultan al-Malik an-Nasir Nasir ad-Donya wa al-Din. Also a title of his father Qalawun was inscribed on his coins as al-Malik al-Mansur.

In his third reign, an-Nasir had on his coins the following remarkable titles which are unique in Mamluk's history: al-Sultan al-Malik al-Nasir Nasir al-Din wa al-Donia (The Sultan King an-Nasir triumphant in faith and temporal world), al-Sultan al-Malik al-Azam (The Greatest Sultan King), al-Sultan al-Malik Nasir al-Donya wa al-Din Qasim Amir al-Mu'amimin ("The Sultan King triumphant in temporal world and in faith, the one who shares with the Emir of faithfuls" (the Caliph)). Unique beseeching phrases that were inscribed on his coins were: Azz Nasroh ("May his victories be glorified") and khalad Allah Mulkoh wa Sultanoh ("May God makes his kingdom and his Sultanate eternal").

== Death ==
On the day of Eid al-Fitr in 1341, al-Nasir Mahammad felt extremely ill and in great pain, but he forced himself to go to prayer, as he did not like to miss any of the prayers, especially prayers such as the Eid prayer.

He went with the senior men of the sultanate to pray the Eid prayer with his people, and he asked the preacher for permission to hasten the sermon because he felt very unwell.

After al-Nasir Mahammad prayed the Eid prayer, he went to the Royal Palace (Qasr al-Ablaq) to rest in his bed. Al-Nasir Muhammad felt that his end was near, so on the second day of the Eid, he asked for his son, Prince al-Mansur Abu Bakr. He issued a decree appointing him as Crown Prince of the sultanate, and he gathered the princes of Egypt and the leaders of the Egyptian army and made them swear allegiance and fidelity to his son. He told the statesmen that if they saw one of his sons or grandchildren from the Qalawunid family of bad conduct or a ruler who was not worthy of Egypt and the Egyptians, they should remove him and appoint a better one (al-Nasir did not know that this will be exploited by the rebellious princes later to kill some of his sons and grandchildren).

On July 21, 1341, Egyptian leaders of state prepared for al-Nasir Muhammad's death. Sitting next to Sultan Mahammad was Ibrahim ibn Shaddad, the Egyptian fellah who had climbed the ranks in the Egyptian army to become the closest man to Sultan Mahammad, who entrusted his secrets, soul, and souls of his family to him.

Some of the feuding princes were looking at each other, waiting for the announcement of the sultan’s death, until they turned against each other. The powerful Sultan Mahammad was the only obstacle to any rebellions or coups in the state. We see, for example, that the Sultan's closest men were arrested immediately after the Sultan's death, and at their head was the Sultan's closest man, Commander Ibrahim bin Shaddad, but he would be released two months later.

After a short while, the Sultan's room became quiet until the doctor approached him and learned that the Sultan had died. He told those in the room that the Sultan of Egypt, al-Nasir Mahammad bin Qalawun, had died at the age of 58 years.

Wailing and crying spread throughout the room, and the judges started throwing their turbans on the ground, and the princes, along with the women, fainted and fell to the ground. That day was sad for the entire nation, since Sultan al-Nasir Mahammad bin Qalawun was the greatest Egyptian sultan known to history, and the sultan whom his people loved the most. The Egyptian people revolted many times in order to support him at the beginning of his reign when he was young and controlled by senior emirs. This indicates that the sultan was well-liked among the people.

Sultan al-Nasir Mahammad ibn Qalawun died, who left Egypt while it was at one of its greatest geographical extent throughout its history. The borders of the sultanate at the time of his death were from the gates of Baghdad in the east to the gates of Tunisia in the west and from central Anatolia (Turkey) in the north to the south of Sudan in the south.

Sultan al-Nasir Mahammad died leaving behind an Egyptian renaissance in all fields, whether economic, social, cultural, artistic, military or political. Most of the Egyptian people during his reign lived a dignified and luxurious life because of his great economic projects and decisions most notably the al-Ruk al-Nasiri and dropping excise duties, i.e. dropping taxes. Sultan al-Nasir Mahammad died leaving an urban renaissance. A mighty feat represented in his construction of 89 mosques (jamie), 73 schools, 33 mosques (masjid), 25 zawiyas, 22 khanqahs, 22 ribats, and five bimaristans (hospitals).

al-Nasir Mahammad died after ruling Egypt for 42 years. They were among the greatest periods of the Egyptian nation throughout its long history, so he left Egypt while it was considered one of the strongest and largest countries in the world at the time of his death.

== Family ==
The prominent Mamluk historian Ibn Iyas wrote the following about Al-Nasir Muhammad: "His name was mentioned everywhere like no other king's name. All the kings wrote to him, sent gifts to him and feared him. The whole of Egypt was in his grasp." Both father and brother of an-Nasir were celebrated sultans and eight of his sons and four of his grandsons were enthroned as sultans of Egypt.

Wives and children:

1. Khawand Ardukin (divorced 1317, d. 21 January 1324, buried Turbat al-Sitt in the Southern Cemetery, City of the Dead) — the daughter of Sayf ad-Din Nogay ibn Bayan, a Mongol emir, and the widow of his brother Sultan Al-Ashraf Khalil. She was apparently the mother of three of his sons, including, al-Malik al-Mansur Ali and al-Malik al-Muzaffar. In 1320, she left the Citadel to live in a residence named after her, Dar Khawand in Hairat Zuwala, Cairo.
  1. Al-Malik al-Mansur Ala al-Din Ali (b. 1303/4, d. 4 December 1310)
  2. Al-Malik al-Muzaffar (b. 28 November 1304, d. 1310)
  3. a son (b. 1301, d. 1310)
2. Tulunbay or Dulanbiya (m. 12 May 1320, divorced 1328, d. 8 September 1340) — the niece of Öz Beg Khan. She did not bear any children and was successively married off, by al-Nasir himself, to three of his amirs.
3. Khawand Toghay (m. 1321, d. December 1348 – January 1349, buried in her own mausoleum in the Northern Cemetery, City of the Dead. ) — was a Turkish slave-girl he bought from Tankiz al-Husami, his governor in Syria. She had a brother named Amir Aqbugha. She was his favourite wife.
  1. Sayf al-Din Anuk (b. 8 April 1323, d. 31 August 1340)
  2. A daughter — m. 22 June 1331 to Baktamur al-Saqi
4. Qutlughmalik (m. 1334) — Tankiz al-Husami's daughter, and Ahmad ibn Baktamur al-Saqi's widow.
  1. As-Salih Salih
  2. A daughter (b. 1339).
5. Khawand Zadu — the sister of Sitt Tuluqartaqa, wife of Yalbugha al-Yahyawi.
6. Another wife — the sister of Qawsun.

Concubines:

- Narjis — Later, al-Nasir married her to Tuquzdamur al-Hamawi. After the latter's death in 1345, she was married to Arghun al-Isma'ili. She was buried in her own mausoleum in the City of the Dead.
  - Al-Mansur Abu Bakr
  - Ramadan (b. 1320, d. 27 February 1343)
  - Jamal al-Din Yusuf (1320-1346)
- Bayad (b. 12 March 1385, d. 1330-31) — She was a singer, had been a slave of Bahadur As, the ra's nawbah. She was later married to Maliktamur al-Sarjuwani.
  - An-Nasir Ahmad
- Ardu — a Tatar woman, After al-Nasir's death, she was married to Aqsunqur al-Nasiri, in 1343, at the latter's request and finally to al-Kamil Sha'ban.
  - Al-Ashraf Kujuk
- Kuda (d. 1341, was buried in her own mausoleum known as Sultaniyya Mausoleum in the Southern Cemetery, City of the Dead.) — a Tatar woman. After her death Ardu adopted her son Hasan.
  - An-Nasir Hasan
  - Tatar al-Hijaziyyah (d. 4 October 1399, buried in her mausoleum which was built by her in 1360) — m. Sayf al-din Tughaytamur al-Umari al-Nasiri on 5 June 1328, m. Maliktamur al-Hijazi in 1333, m. Tankizbugha in 1347
    - A daughter (by Tankizbugha) — m. Al-Ashraf Sha'ban
  - A daughter (d. 1341) — m. Tankizbugha al-Maridani.
- Unnamed woman — was later married by al-Nasir to Arghun al-Ala'i. During Isma'il's reign, Kujuk was seen by her and her son as a potential contender for the throne. In September 1342, she accused Kujuk's mother, Ardu of having used sorcery to cause Isma'il's illness. In 1346, she was expelled from the Citadel by Sultan Al-Muzaffar Hajji.
  - As-Salih Ismail
  - Al-Kamil Sha'ban
  - Zahra — m. Aqsunqur al-Nasir in 1347; m. Sayf al-Din Taz on 3 June 1351
    - A daughter (by Taz) — m. Al-Ashraf Sha'ban
  - Another daughter (d. 1 March 1343) — m. before 1340 to Bahadur al-Damurdashi.
- Unnamed woman — was later married to Lajin al-Ala'i. He was compelled by Sultan Al-Kamil Sha'ban, during his reign, to divorce her. She was buried in her mausoleum on the island of Rhoada, outside the Bab Mahrouk.
  - al-Muzzafar Hajji — m. a daughter of Tankiz al-Husami on 15 January 1347
    - Al-Mansur Muhammad
- Unnamed woman
  - Jamal al-Din Ibrahim (before 1320 - 14 June 1338)
  - al-Amjad Husayn (before 1334 - 21 January 1363)
    - Al-Ashraf Sha'ban
    - Anuk (d. 1391)
    - others

Other children:

- Aisha al-Qurdumiyya — m. Qurdum al-Nasiri al-Hamawi. Died in a great state of poverty on 11 February 1396.
- Fatima — had a son named Abd al-Rabb.
- Another daughter (d. 10 October 1399) — m. Tankizbugha al-Maridani.
- Another daughter — m. Abi Bakr, son of Arghun al-Nasiri al-Na'ib on 16 August 1322.
- Another daughter — m. Qawsun on 26 April 1327. The marriage was consummated on 3 October 1327; m. Shaykhu in 1342.
  - Khalil (by Qawsun)
  - A son (by Shaykhu) b. 18 June 1355; d. 25 June 1355) - She was blinded in his birth.
- Another daughter — m. Qumari.
  - Two daughters — m. Muhammad and Ahmad, sons of Tankiz al-Husami on 5 January 1339.
- Another daughter — m. Tuquzdamur al-Hamawi.

== See also ==
- List of rulers of Egypt
- Nâçerî

== Notes ==
Al-Nasir Muhammad Bahri dynasty Cadet branch of the Mamluk Sultanate Born: 24 March 1285 Died: 7 June 1341
Regnal titles
Preceded by Al-Ashraf Khalil	Sultan of Egypt and Syria; December 1293 – December 1295 with Al-Adil Kitbugha	Succeeded by Al-Adil Kitbugha
Preceded by Lajin	Sultan of Egypt and Syria; 16 January 1299 – March 1309 with Baibars al-Jashnakir; Seif ad-Din Salar	Succeeded by Baibars al-Jashnakir
Preceded by Baibars al-Jashnakir	Sultan of Egypt and Syria; 5 March 1310 – 7 June 1341	Succeeded by Saif ad-Din Abu-Bakr
