= Nâçerî =

Nâçerî is a famous treatise of hippology drafted about the year 1333, by Abou Bakr Ibn Badr Eddîn Ibn It Moundir The Baïtar, ordered by the Mamluk sultan An-Nasir Muhammad, also called sultan Ennâcer (victorious), whence the name of Naceri (relative to Nacer).

Of all the treatises of hippology, the Nâçerî is probably the best known, as a result of the attention devoted to it by the French doctor Nicolas Perron who published, between 1852 and 1960, three volumes of comments on the translation of the manuscript n° 2814 of the Bibliothèque nationale de France. This work has given to the scholars studying that period the necessary elements to strengthen the already existing belief of the high quality of the Arab Veterinarians of that era.

== See also ==
- Veterinary medicine
- Arabian horse
- Barb horse

== Bibliography ==
- Hippologie et médecine du cheval en terre d'islam au XIVe siècle : Le traité des deux arts en médecine vétérinaire dit le Nâceri, éd. Errance, 2006
