= Cairo Citadel Aqueduct =

Medieval aqueduct system in Cairo, Egypt

- سور مجرى العيون (Arabic)
- Mamluk Aqueduct
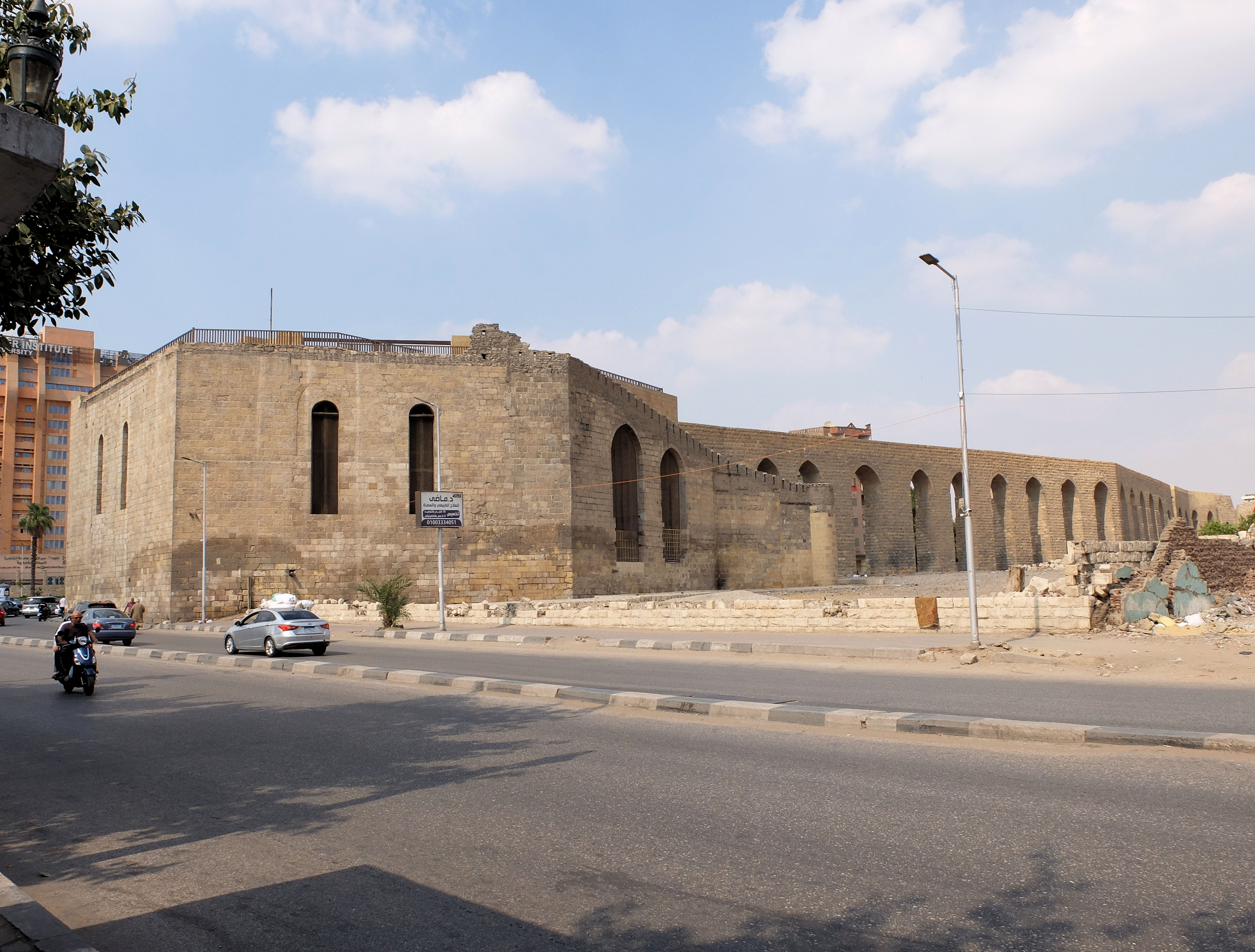
- Water intake tower (left) and aqueduct (right) at Fumm al-Khalig today, near the shore of the Nile
- Interactive map of Cairo Citadel Aqueduct
- 30°01′19.5″N 31°13′49″E (Coordinates of Nile water intake tower)
- Type: Aqueduct
- Location: Cairo (near Old Cairo), Egypt

History
- Founder: al-Nasir Muhammad (and al-Ashraf Khalil)
- Built: 1176–early 13th century CE (approximate)

Site notes
- Architectural style: Mamluk
- Restored: 1311/12; 1480; 1506–1508
- Restored by: Qansuh al-Ghuri

The Cairo Citadel Aqueduct or Mamluk Aqueduct (Arabic: سور مجرى العيون, romanized: sūr magra al-ʿayyūn) is a medieval aqueduct system in Cairo, Egypt. It was first conceived and built during the Ayyubid period (under Salah ad-Din and his successors) but was later reworked by several Mamluk sultans to expand the provision of water to the Citadel of Cairo. Although no longer functioning today, much of the aqueduct structure, including its water intake tower, the Fumm al-Khalig, still stands.

== History ==
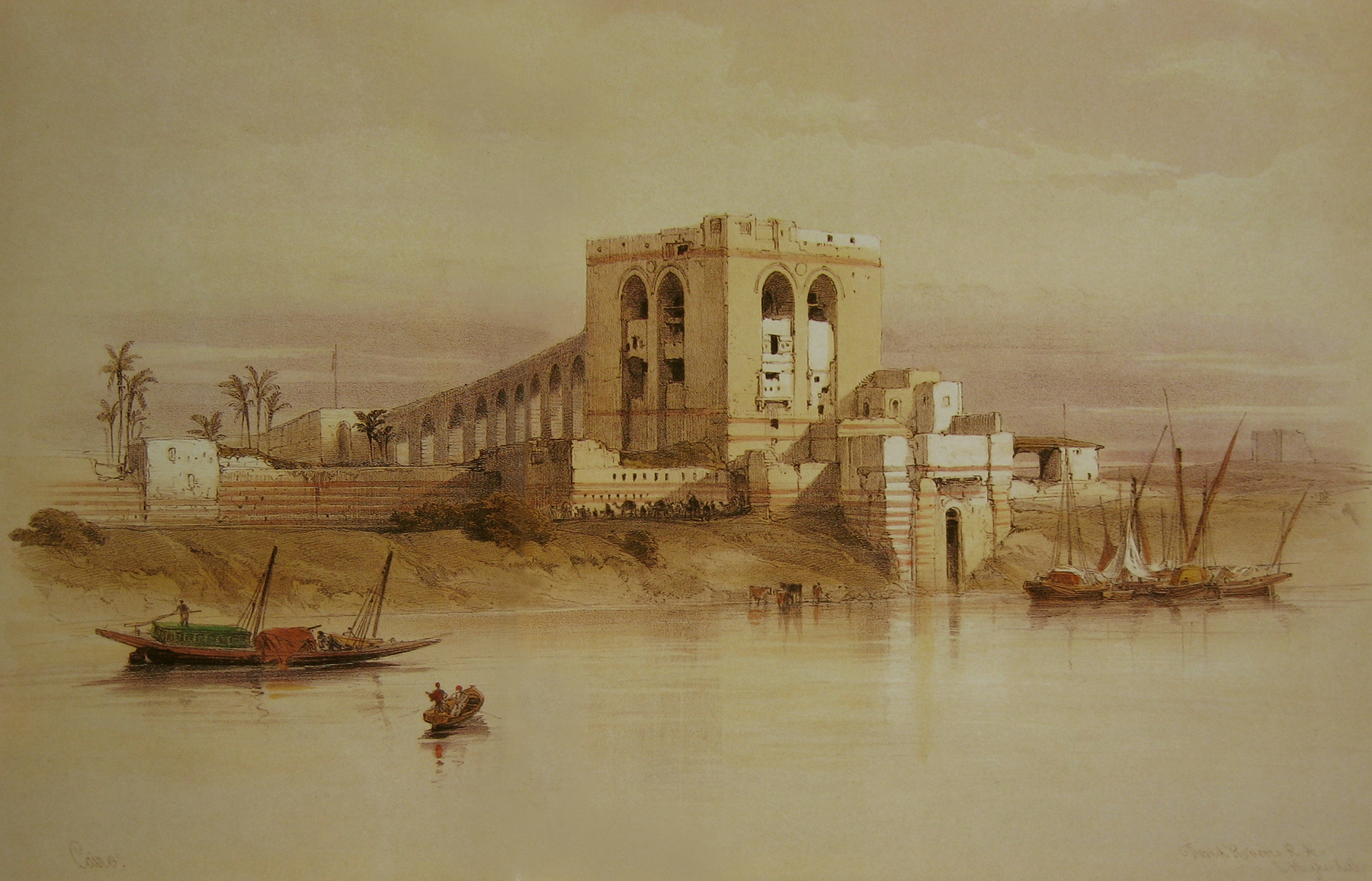
An 1838 illustration of the Fumm al-Khalig water intake tower

=== Ayyubid aqueduct ===
The Citadel of Cairo was a massive fortified complex and royal residence begun by Salah ad-Din (Saladin) in 1176 and most likely finished by al-Kamil at the beginning of the 13th century. The Citadel was the centerpiece of a new extensive defensive system for Cairo which included building a long wall around both Cairo and the older city of Fustat and connecting it to the Citadel. Salah ad-Din, or one of his Ayyubid successors, also developed the idea of bringing water from the Nile to the Citadel by building a canal along the top of this wall. The aqueduct started from the wall's western end near Fustat (at the shore of the Nile), where water was raised through a series of waterwheels, and ran from there to the Citadel. This project was likely carried out or finished by al-Kamil (even though the full course of the defensive wall Salah ad-Din had envisioned was never fully finished). This aqueduct system was built in addition to the famous Spiral Well built by Salah ad-Din (also known as the Bi'r Yusuf) inside the Citadel, which could provide water in times of siege in case the aqueduct was cut off.

=== First Mamluk aqueduct ===
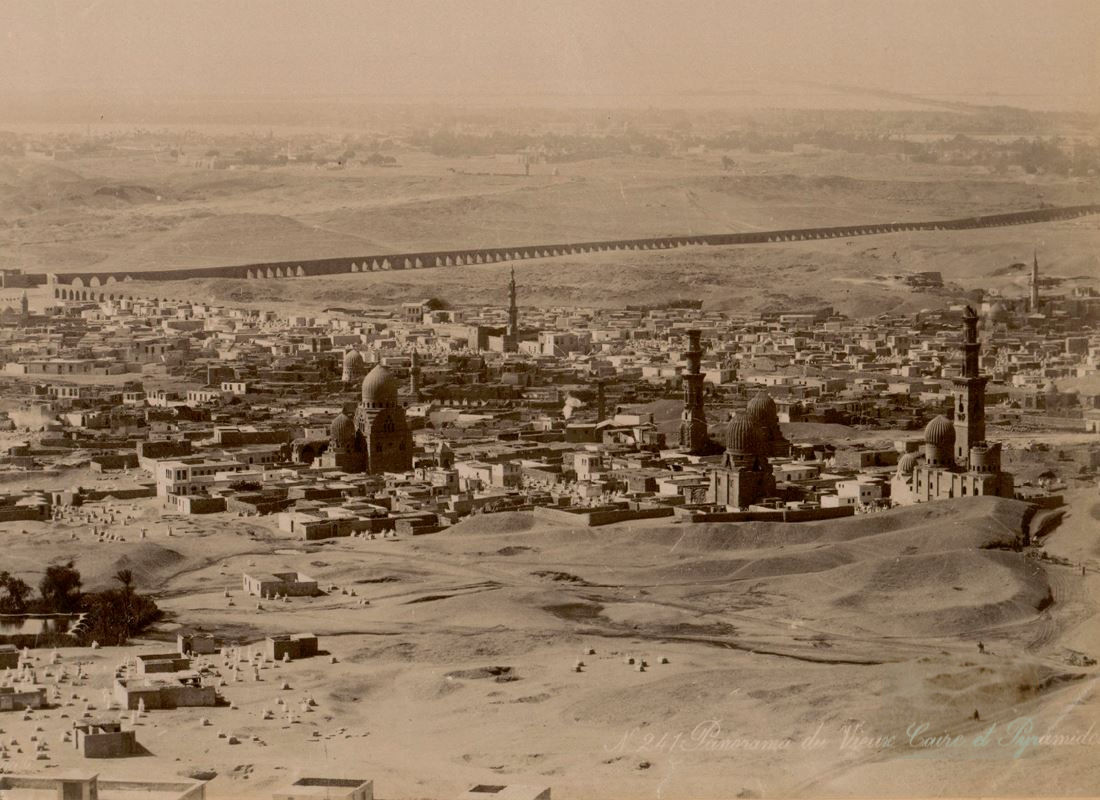
View of the aqueduct (the dark line in the distance) passing through the Qarafa cemetery region on its way to the Citadel, in 1890

During the Mamluk period, the Citadel was further developed by successive sultans into an even more elaborate complex, with more ambitious buildings. In particular, under Sultan al-Nasir Muhammad in the early 14th century the Citadel was expanded and several important palaces and monuments were built within and around it. In 1311 or 1312, al-Nasir Muhammad ordered the renovation and improvement of the Citadel's aqueduct. His predecessor and brother, Sultan al-Ashraf Khalil, was likely responsible for having already built the water intake tower but was likely killed before he could do more. Al-Nasir completed the project.

The intake tower was located on the shore of the Nile in the area now known as Fumm al-Khalig, north of Fustat (or "Old Cairo" today) and further north than the Ayyubid-era wall and canal. This was where the former Khalij (or Khalig), an ancient canal that once joined the Nile with the Red Sea, branched off the river. The intake tower is hexagonal and featured four waterwheels (saaqiyyas) which raised water to the top of the tower, from where it flowed along a set of channels along the aqueduct. Along the way, al-Nasir built another tower with three more waterwheels raising the water to an even higher level, after which it continued to run along an aqueduct until it reached the foot of the citadel, at which point it was yet again raised by waterwheels in another tower. From this last tower the water then entered into the Citadel and into a reservoir known as the Bi'r al-Sa'b Sawaqi ("Well of the Seven Waterwheels"), inside the Citadel's southern enclosure (near the harem area) and southwest of the famous Spiral Well of Salah ad-Din. From this reservoir, water was distributed by an underground network to the rest of the buildings in the Citadel. The aqueduct itself consisted of a channel carried along the top of large stone piers and arches, which ran for about one-and-a-half kilometers due east before turning northeast, and after half a kilometer the aqueduct then joins the old canal which was constructed along the top of Salah ad-Din's city wall. This new system increased the amount of water brought to the Citadel, allowing al-Nasir Muhammad to carry out his major building projects in the Citadel, such as his mosque and the great palace known as the Qasr al-Ablaq ("Striped Palace").

=== Later Mamluk restoration ===
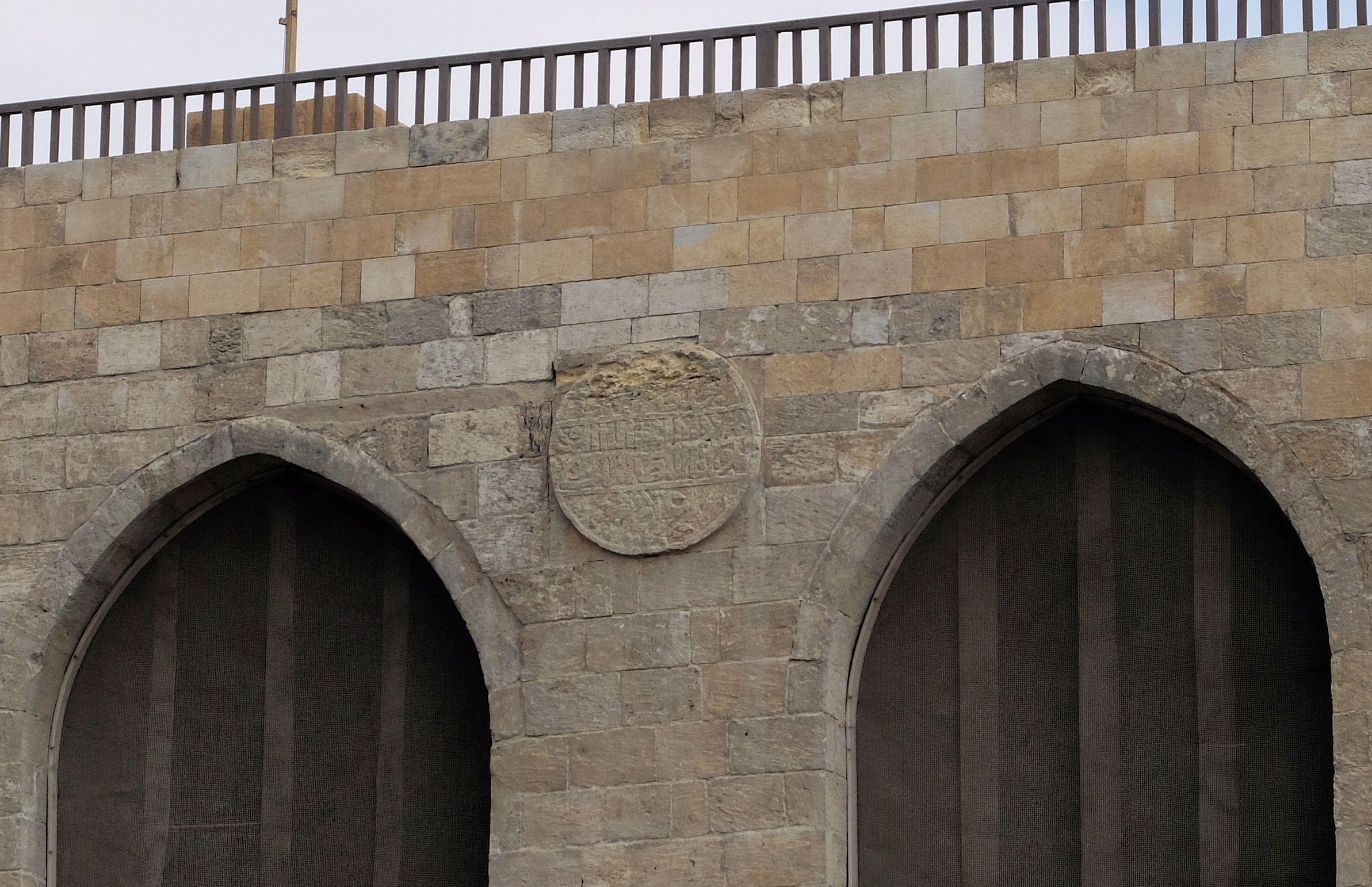
Medallion with Arabic inscription featuring the name of Sultan al-Ghuri, visible on the outer wall of the intake tower

In 1480, Sultan Qaytbay undertook major repairs on the aqueduct. More significantly, from 1506 to 1508 Sultan al-Ghuri embarked on a major overhaul of the aqueduct system. He expanded or rebuilt the water intake tower, increasing the number of waterwheels from 4 to 6, and placed his emblem on the tower's walls. The tall arched openings in the western sides of the tower, as seen today, are where the waterwheels were once located. At the top of the tower were other wheels which were turned by oxen to power the waterwheels below. Al-Ghuri also rebuilt many of the aqueduct's arches, and the section of aqueduct closest to the Nile is attributed to him.

=== After the Mamluk period ===
The aqueduct continued to be used during the Ottoman period, but fell into disuse during the French occupation of Egypt by Napoleon between 1798 and 1801 when the water intake tower was adapted for use by the French as a fort. According to art historian Caroline Williams, the aqueduct and the Khalij canal continued to provide water for Cairo up until 1872.

=== 20th century ===
In the 20th century, parts of the aqueduct were lost or destroyed due to disrepair and modern constructions; in particular, the final section of the aqueduct near the Citadel has disappeared. A section of the wall was constructed in 1982–83, following the collapse of the original section in 1950–51.

== Present day ==
Much of the aqueduct's course, except for the section near the Citadel, can still be seen today, as can the massive hexagonal water intake tower from al-Ghuri's renovations. The monument has suffered from neglect and modern encroachments, but underwent some restoration and repairs in the 2000s. As of 2018, there are also plans to redevelop and refurbish the area around the aqueduct so as to highlight it as a heritage monument. In 2023, a section of the wall which was built in the 1980s was cleaned and restored as part of the renovations of the Al-Sayyida Nafisa Mosque. In early January 2026, additional cleaning and restoration work resumed on the section constructed in the 1980s.

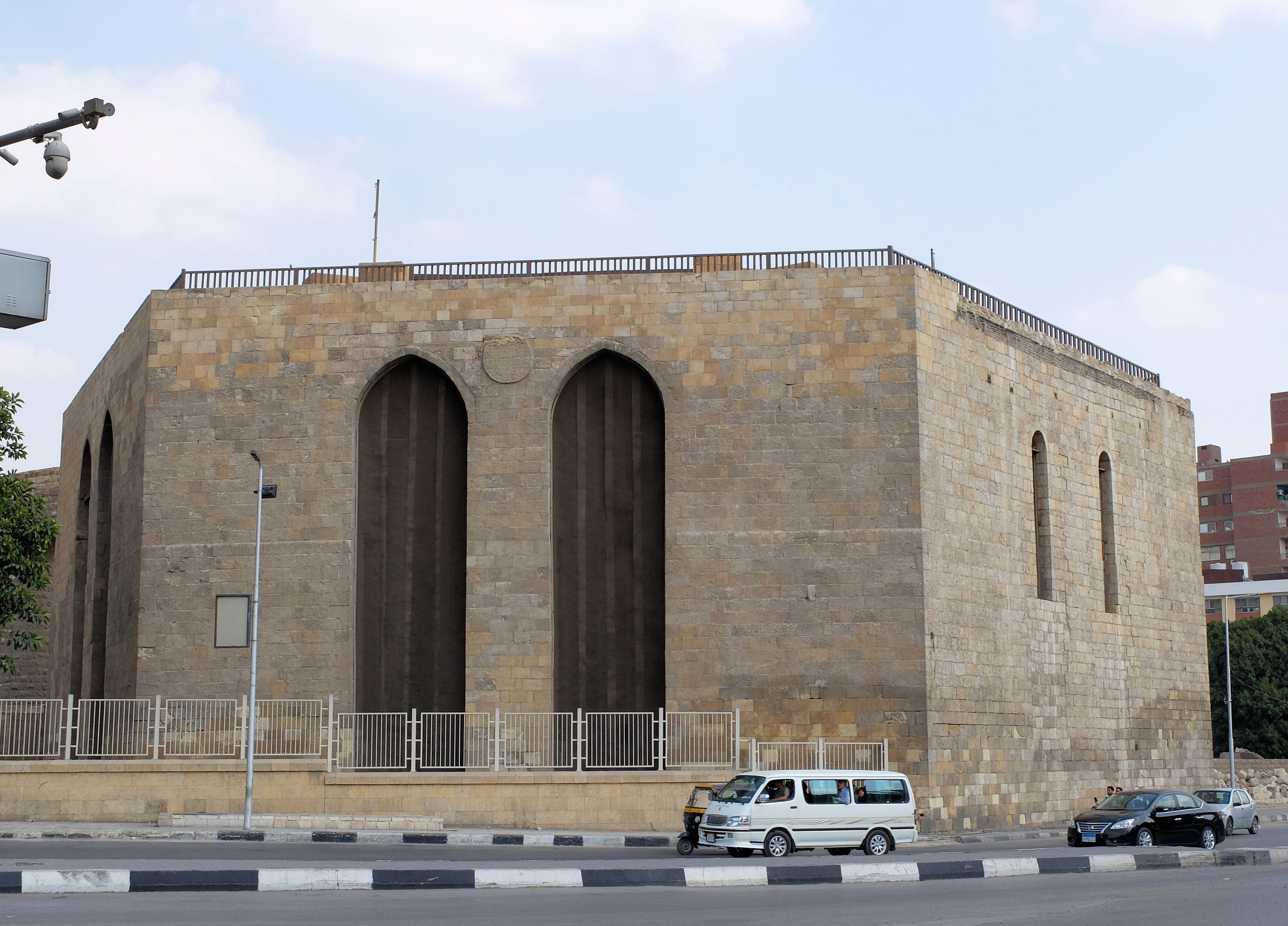
The early 16th-century intake tower raised water from the Nile onto the aqueduct. Large openings for the former oxen-powered waterwheels are still visible.

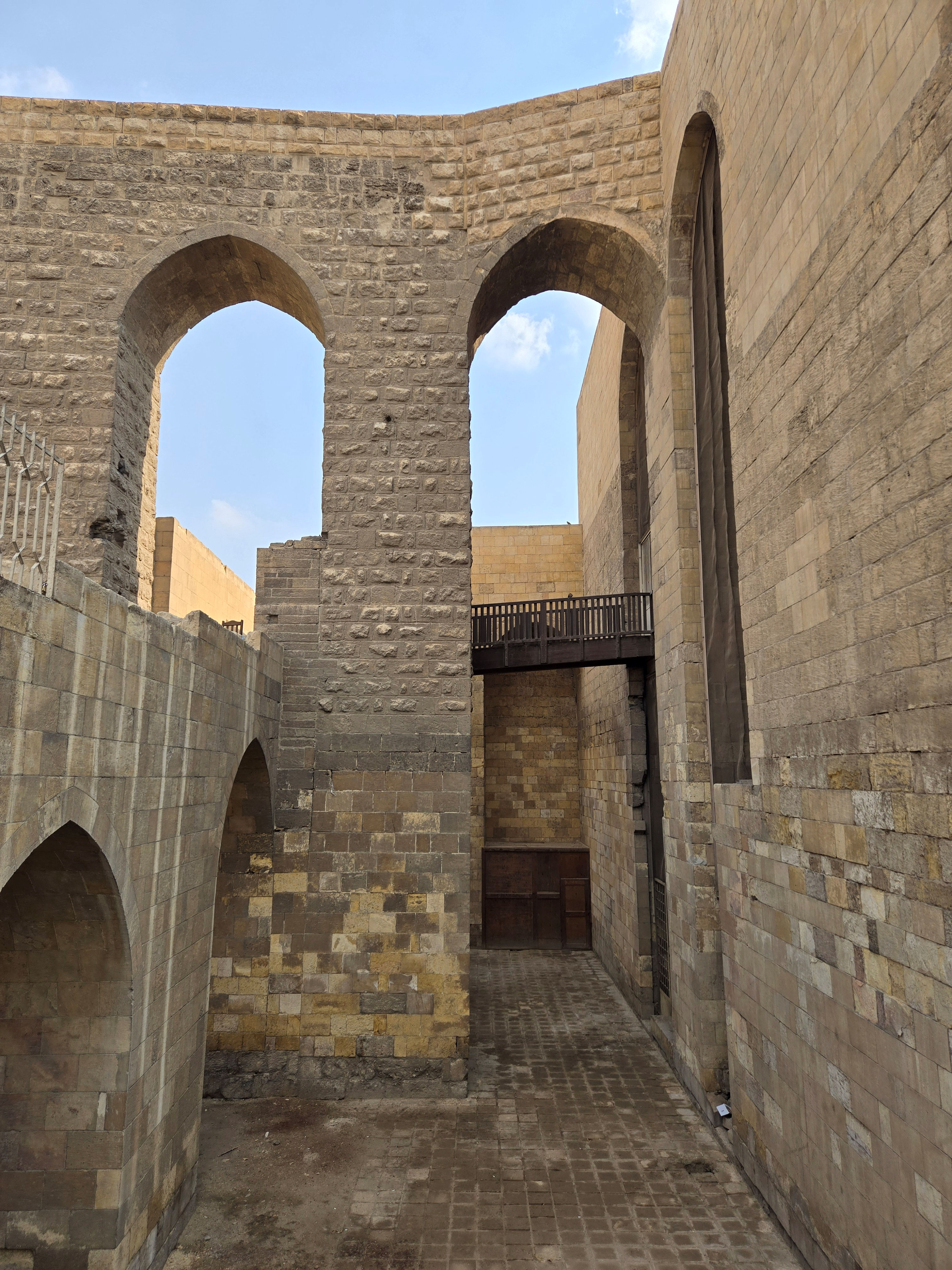
Connection between the intake tower and the aqueduct

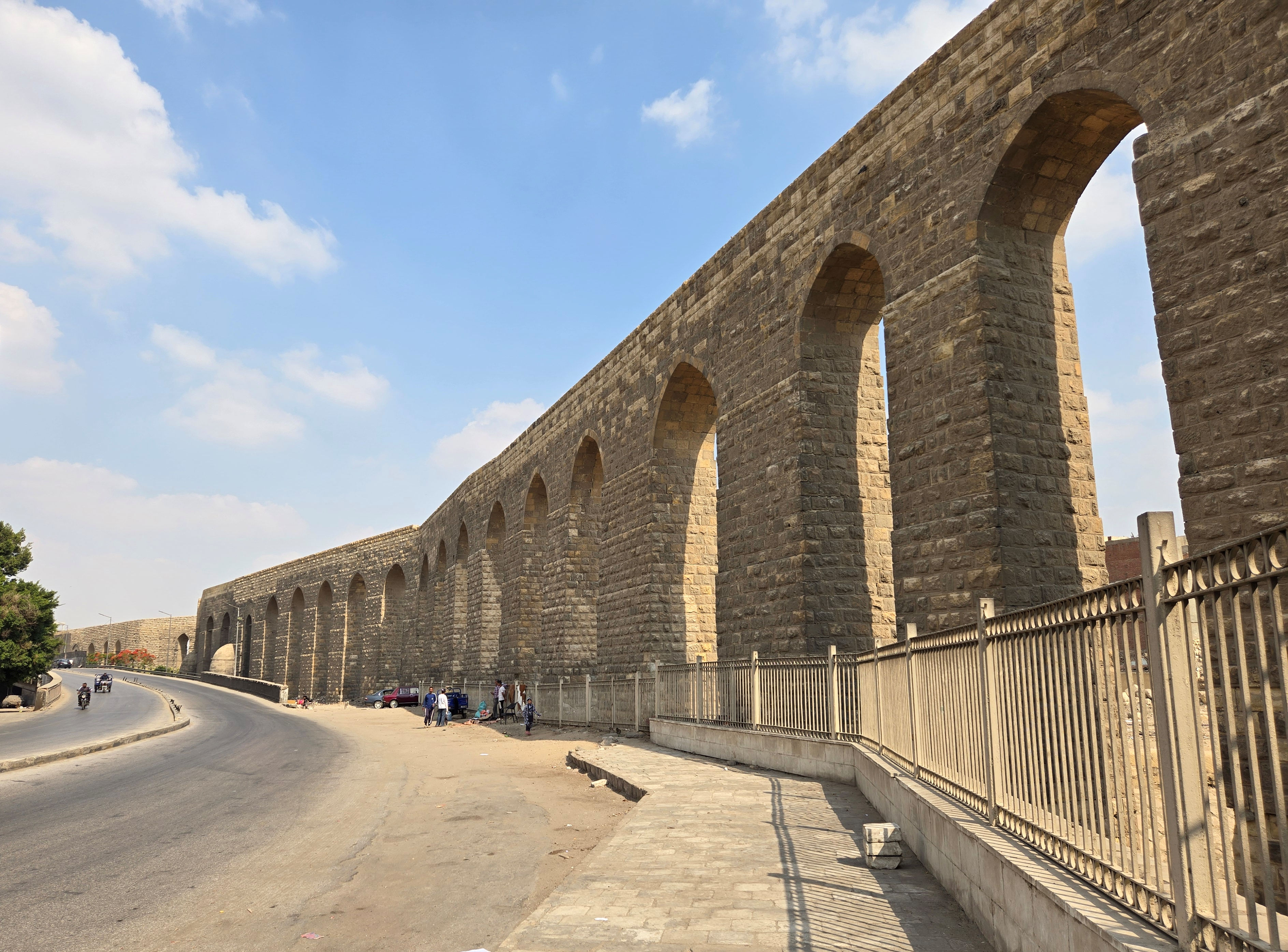
Section of the aqueduct near the intake tower, running east towards the Citadel

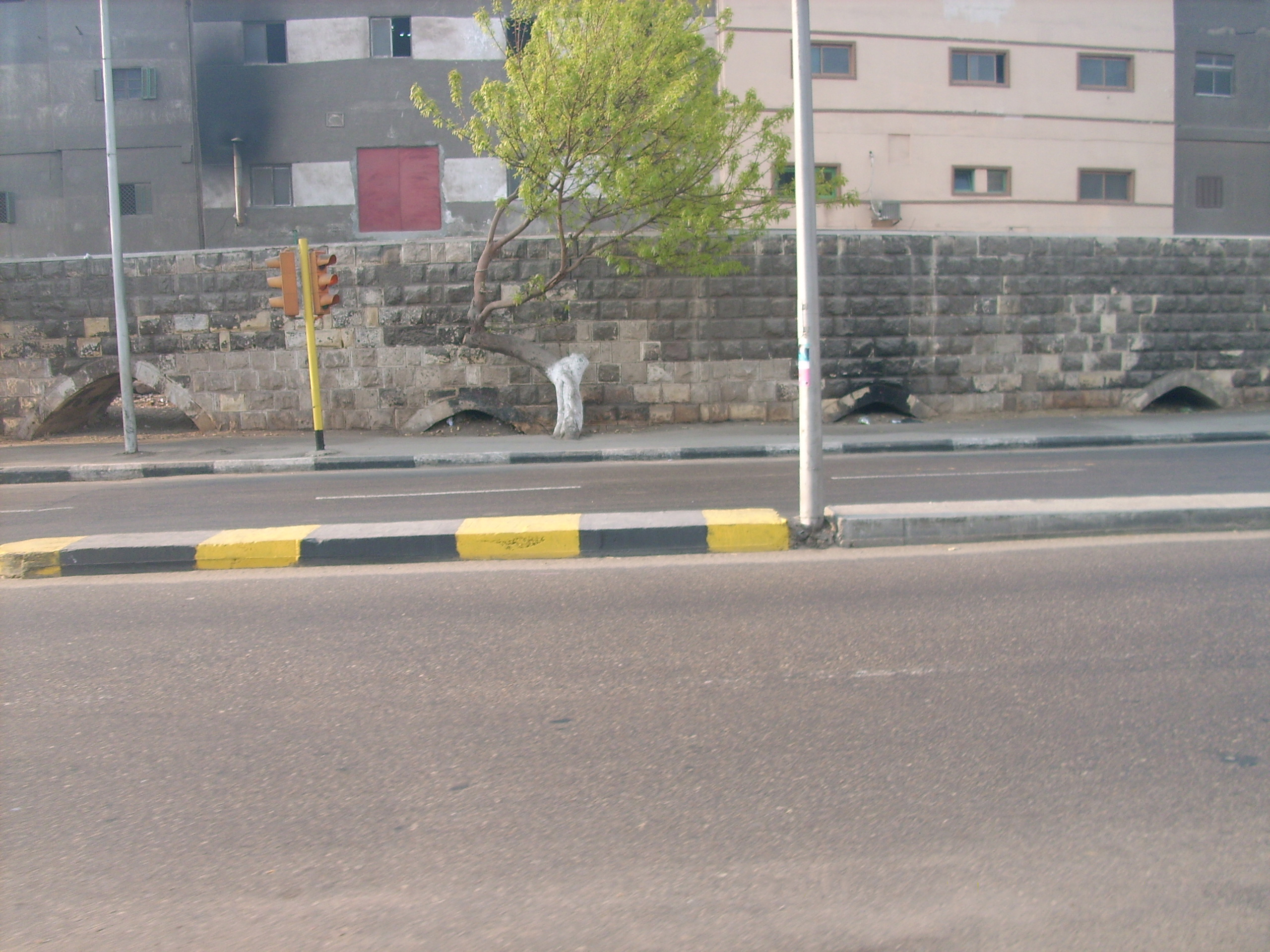
Section of the aqueduct further east, on higher ground as it approaches the Citadel
