= Khawand Toghay =

Khawand Toghay (14th-century), was a slave concubine and then wife of Al-Nasir Mohammad Ibn Qala'un (r. 1293-1341).

She was his slave before he freed her and married her. She was known for having a kind heart, and attending to all her slaves' needs after she was freed. She gave birth to Prince Anook.

She was noted as an influential woman in court decisions.

== See also ==
- Tomb and Khanqah of Khawand Tughay
