= Ibrahim bin Shaddad =

Egyptian Muqadam al-Mahalla and Muqadam al-Dawla (Late 13th century – 1342)

Ibrahim bin Abu Bakr bin Shaddad bin Saber
- Born: Late 13th century El Mahalla El Kubra, Mamluk Sultanate.
- Died: 1342; Cairo, Mamluk Sultanate.
- Military career
- Allegiance: Mamluk Sultanate of Egypt
- Branch: Egyptian army
- Rank: Muqadam al-Dawla (Minister of Interior)
- Conflicts: Levant rebellions

Ibrahim bin Abu Bakr bin Shaddad bin Saber (Egyptian Arabic: إبراهيم بن أبو بكر بن شداد بن صابر), commonly known as Ibrahim bin Shaddad (late 13th century – 1342), was an Egyptian military commander and politician. He was the muqadam (military assistant to the governor) of El Mahalla El Kubra and later the muqadam al-Dawla (equivalent to an interior minister). He comes from the Egyptian Shaddad family, and he was the closest companion to the Mamluk sultan al-Nasir Mahammad.

== Early life ==
Ibrahim bin Shaddad bin Saber is originally an Egyptian fellah (farmer) from the fellahin of Minyat Abbad in Gharbiyyah. His father was Muqadam of El Mahalla El Kubra (Military Assistant to the Governor of El Mahalla). A problem arose between his father and the Governor of the El Mahalla, Qaisar, which led to his imprisonment and death in prison. So Ibrahim bin Shaddad traveled to Cairo to complain to the Egyptian Sultan al-Nasir Mahammad bin Qalawun, who did justice to Ibn Shaddad and brought him justice from the Governor of Mahalla. This was his first meeting with al-Nasir Mahammad ibn Qalawun.

== Career ==
After that, Ibrahim was appointed Muqadam of El Mahalla, then he was removed after a while and came to Cairo, and after a while he entered the Egyptian army within the forces of Emir Sanjar al-Khazen. Ibrahim ibn Shaddad rose through the ranks in an amazing way until he reached the position of Muqadam al-Dawla (Minister of Interior) and became one of the most powerful leaders of the Egyptian state during the reign of al-Nasir Muhammad ibn Qalawun, to the point that he appointed many of his relatives to different positions like his cousins, Ahmad bin Zaid bin Shaddad and Mahammad bin Yusuf bin Shaddad.

== Relationship with al-Nasir ==
Ibrahim ibn Shaddad, proving to al-Nasir Mahammad ibn Qalawun the extent of his sincerity and competence in his work, led him to gain the respect and love of al-Nasir Mahammad and to be very close to him to the point that he became his true friend, companion, and confidant. The Egyptian historian Al-Maqrizi says about this:

"And he gained power in the days of the Sultan and became great, and neither the Supervisor of the state (speaker on behalf of the Sultan) nor the head of the bureaus had any conversation with him, but he would approach the Sultan and talk to him secretly. And he does what he wants, and no one can respond to his actions or words."

Al-Nasir Mahammad entrusted Ibrahim Ibn Shaddad with the souls of his family and those close to him, and asked him to protect them and provide guardianship to his family. He used to make him the one who carried out the rulings in his name and in his place. An example of this is when he executed the ruling by beating up the Emir Tankiz the na'ib (deputy) of the Levant and then choked him, he also participated in suppressing the rebellions of the emirs of the Levant. Almost the entire Egyptian state was envious of Ibrahim bin Shaddad for his position and the extent of his closeness to the Sultan, so some of the princes of the state preferred to wait for the opportunity to pounce on him, and the opportunity came to them when al-Nasir died.

== False charges ==
As soon as the Sultan died, they accused him with a false charge and arrested him. The historian al-Maqrizi says that they found in his house 80 concubines, 140 horses, 300 milking cows, 500 calving ewes, and an amount of two hundred thousand and eighty thousand dirhams. It was not permissible for them to arrest the closest man to the great Sultan Mahammad bin Qalawun, especially since he was a feared figure in the state, with his status and pride, and who was known for his extreme loyalty to the late Sultan al-Nasir Mahammad. He was released one month after his arrest after emirs, including emir al-Mulk and Jawhar al-Saharti, defended him.

== Death ==
He died in 1342 in Cairo.

== Lagacy ==
The historian Al-Maqrizi says about his description:

"He was very tall and very aware of his suffering, and he acquired many properties, and no one saw in the offering what he saw as far as we know."
