= Ibn Habib al-Halabi =

al-Ḥasan ibn ʿUmar al-Dimashqī al-Ḥalabī (Arabic: الحسن بن عمر الدمشقي الحلبي), known as Ibn Ḥabīb al-Ḥalabī (1310–1377CE) was a Levantine author, renowned as a poet, historian and essayist. His full name was Abū Muḥammad Badr al-Dīn al-Ḥasan ibn ʿUmar ibn Ḥasan ibn Ḥabīb al-Dimashqī al-Ḥalabī. He was born in Damascus in 710 AH, he grew up and died in Aleppo. During his life he travelled to Egypt, the Hijaz and Turkey, later writing about some of his travels.

== Works ==
- Pearls of Travels in the Land of the Turks (Durrat al-aslāk fī dawlat al-atrāk), written in rhyming prose (saj') as he did in his other books, this work was dedicated to his son Zayn al-Dīn Ṭāhir.
- The Breeze of the Zephyr (Nasīm al-ṣabā), written in the year 756 AH and arranged in thirty chapters, it covers a great variety of literary topics.
- Dialogues (al-Maqāmāt).
- The Little Garden of Anecdotes on the Names of the Caliphs and Kings of the Great Cities (Juhaynat al-akhbār fī asmāʾ al-khulafā wa-mulūk al-amṣār).
- A Record of the Illustrious One in the Days of al-Mansur and His Sons (Tadhkirat al-nabīh fī ayām al-Manṣūr wa-banīhi). A collection of reports about Sultan Qalawun and his sons.
- The Shining Star (al-Najm al-thāqib), on the life of the Prophet.
- Rhythm and Rhyme in Memory of the Virtues of the Chosen One (al-Muqtafā fī dhikr faḍāʾil al-Muṣṭafā).
- Kashf al-murūṭ, on Shafi'i school fiqh.
