= Custodian of the Two Holy Mosques =

Islamic title

- خَادِمُ ٱلْحَرَمَيْنِ ٱلشَّرِيفَيْنِ Khādim al-Ḥaramayn aš-Šarīfayn (in Arabic)
- Royal Standard of Saudi Arabia

Incumbent
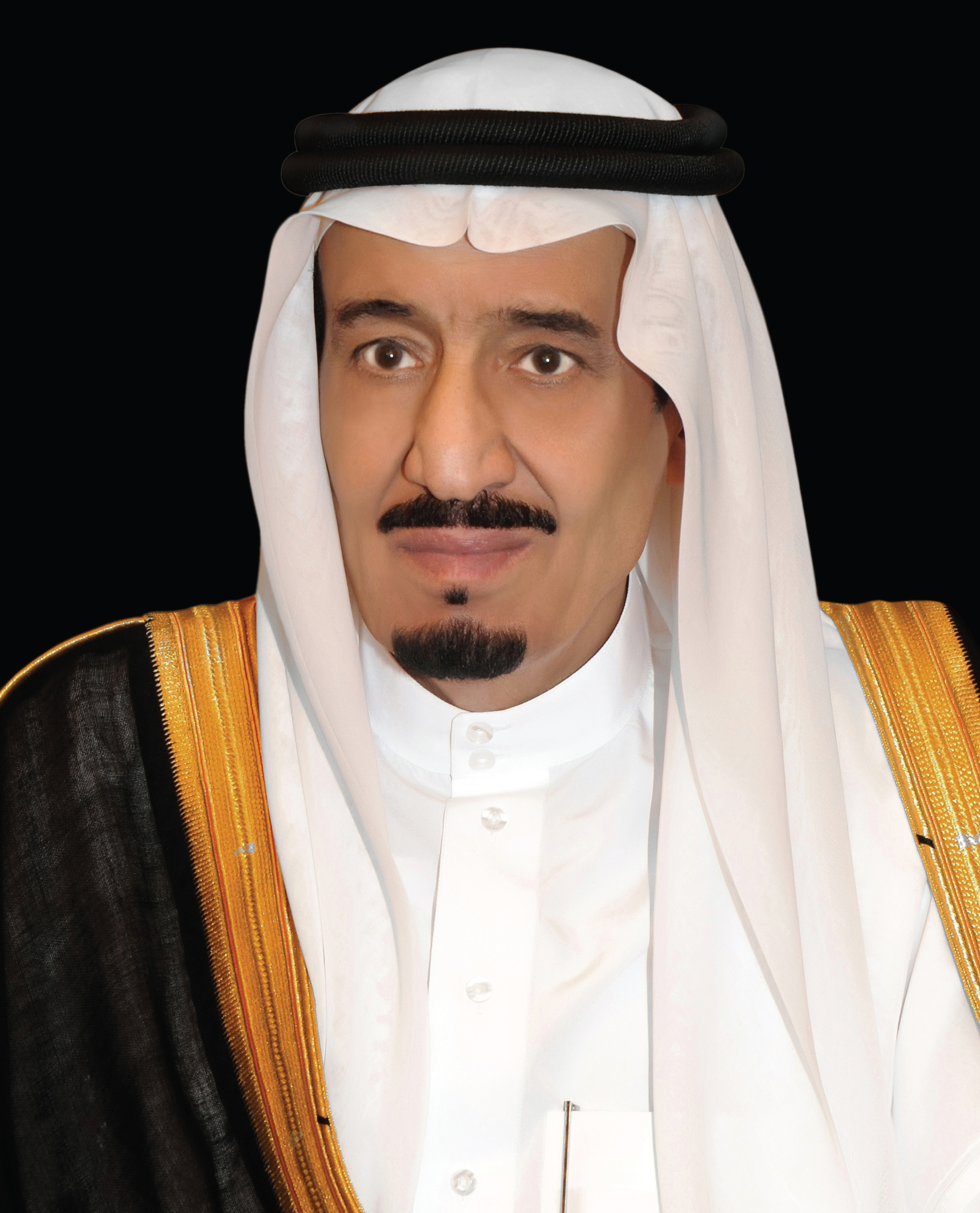
- Salman bin Abdulaziz Al Saud since 23 January 2015

Details
- Style: His Majesty the Custodian of the Two Holy Mosques
- Heir presumptive: Mohammed bin Salman Al Saud
- First monarch: Saladin
- Formed: 12th century CE (de facto); November 1986 (de jure)
- Residences: Al-Yamamah Palace (Riyadh); Al-Salam Palace (Jeddah)

The Custodian of the Two Holy Mosques (abbreviated as CTHM; Arabic: خَادِمُ ٱلْحَرَمَيْنِ ٱلشَّرِيفَيْنِ, romanized: Khādim al-Ḥaramayn aš-Šarīfayn, lit. 'Servant of the Two Noble Sanctuaries'), or Protector of the Two Holy Cities, is a royal style that has been used officially by the monarchs of Saudi Arabia since 1986. The title has historically been used by many Muslim rulers in the past, including the Ayyubids, the Mamluks, the Ottomans and the Sharifian rulers of Hejaz. The title was sometimes regarded to denote the de facto Caliph of Islam, but it mainly refers to the ruler taking the responsibility of guarding and maintaining the two holiest mosques in Islam: Al-Haram Mosque (Arabic: اَلْمَسْجِدُ ٱلْحَرَامُ, romanized: Al-Masjid al-Ḥarām, 'The Sacred Mosque') in Mecca and the Prophet's Mosque (Arabic: اَلْمَسْجِدُ ٱلنَّبَوِيُّ, romanized: Al-Masjid an-Nabawī) in Medina, both of which are in the Hejazi region of Saudi Arabia. The Custodian has been named the most powerful and influential person in Islam and the Sunni branch of Islam by The Muslim 500, as well as the most powerful Muslim and Arab ruler in the world.

Styles of His Majesty the Custodian of the Two Holy Mosques
- Reference style: His Majesty the Custodian of the Two Holy Mosques
- Spoken style: Your Majesty

== History ==
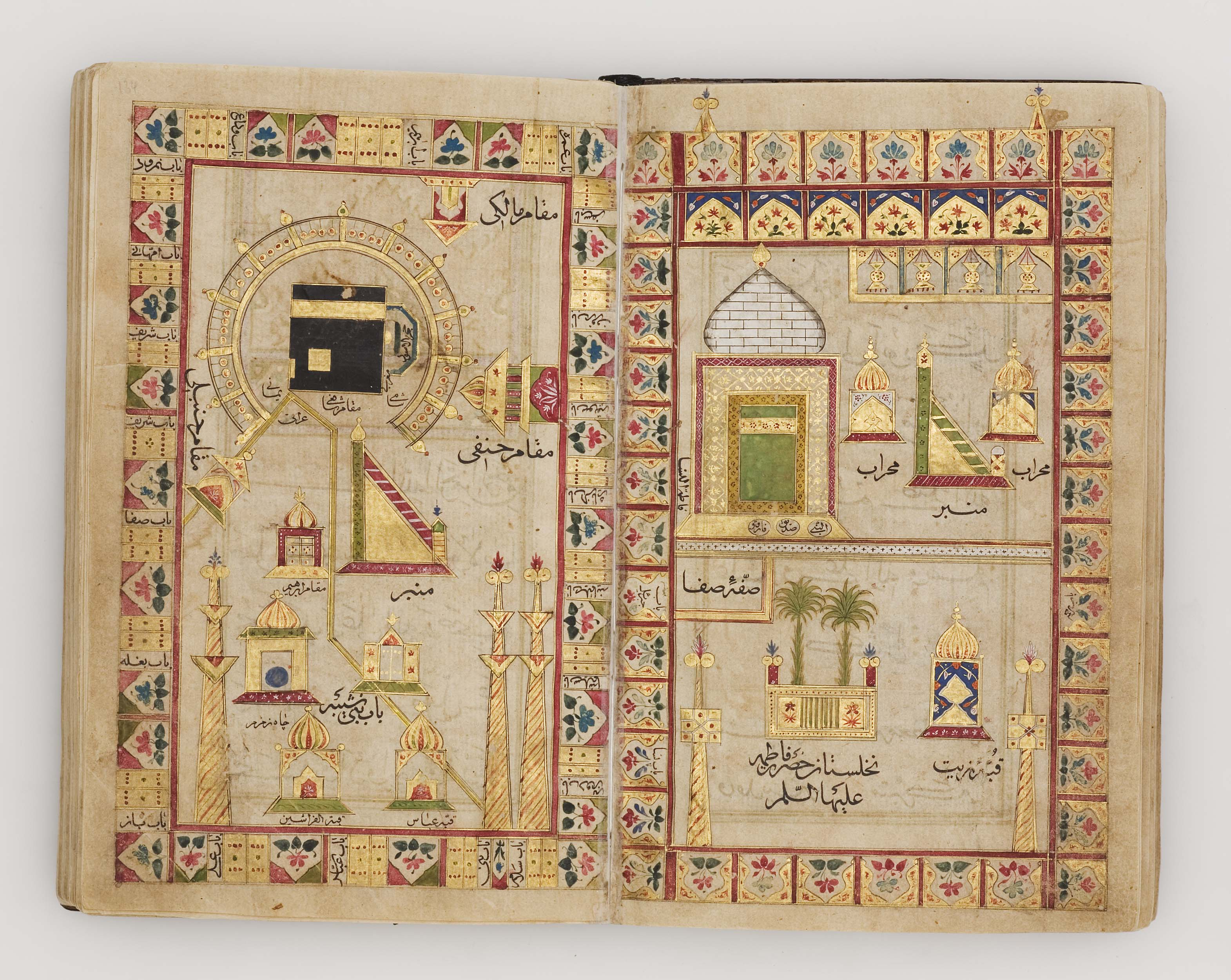
The holy mosques of Masjid al-Haram in Mecca (left) and Masjid al-Nabawi in Medina (right), illustrated in an 18th-century religious manuscript

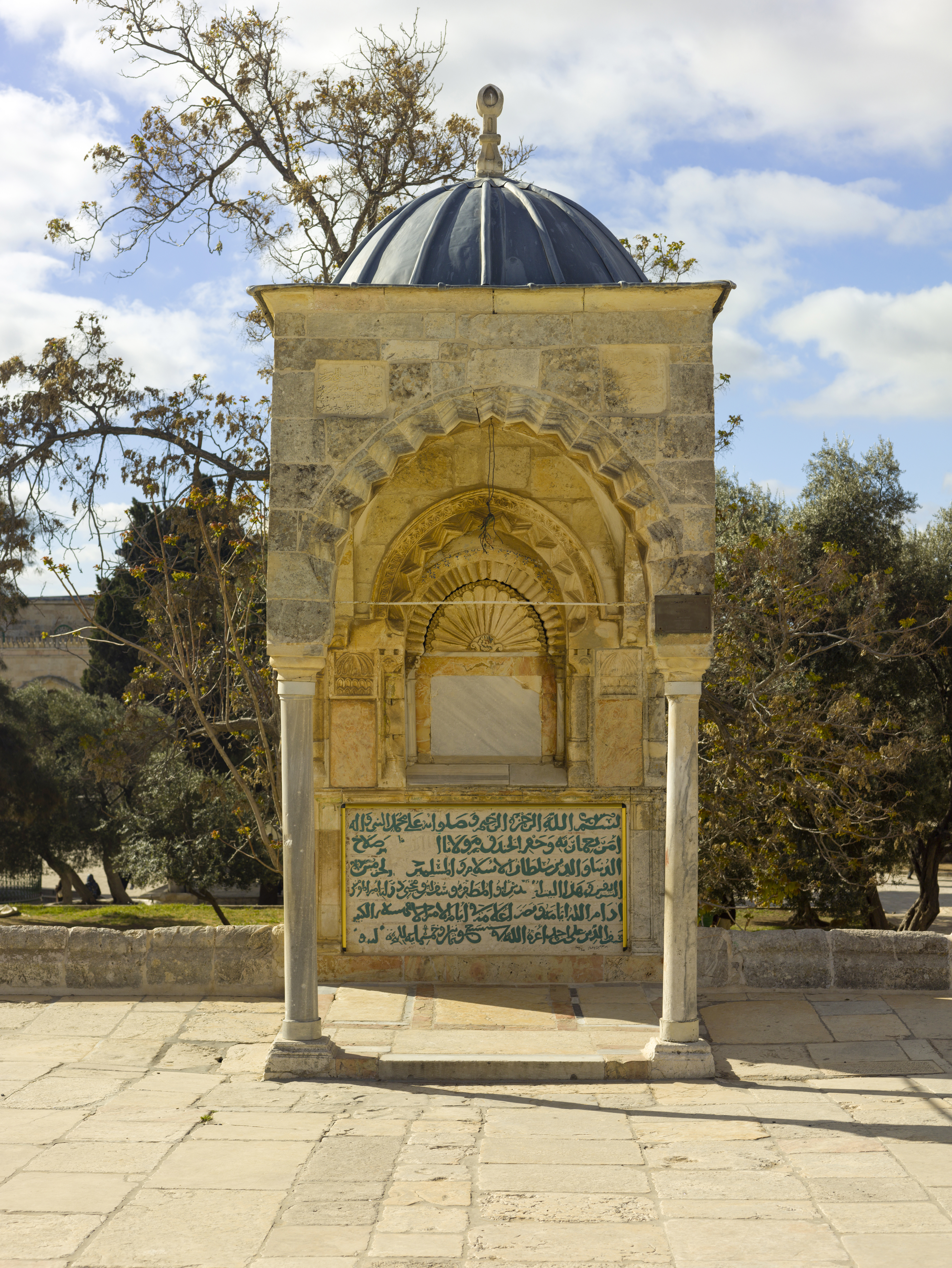
The title appears in the Dome of Yusuf, built by Saladin in the 12th century

It is believed that the first person to use the title was Saladin.

With the Mongols ending the universal Abbasid Caliphate in 1258, the "Custodian of the Two Holy Mosques" became the most prestigious and internationally recognised title in the Islamic World. This led to much competition over the title, with Timurid ruler Shahrukh (1405-1447) sending a richly decorated Mahmal to the Sharifs of Mecca and Medina to contest the claim of Mamluk Sultan Barsbay (1422-1438). A few decades later, the Aq Qoyunlu did similar, with Uzun Hassan sending annual Mahmals from 1469 to 1477, worsening relations with the Mamluk Sultan Qaitbay (1468-1496). In Medina 1473, the Aq Qoyunlu succeeded in getting the khutbah read in the name of Uzun Hassan, who was titled as 'Custodian of the two Holy Cities' throughout the Prophet's city. However, they were then arrested in Mecca and imprisoned in Cairo for the next 7 years.

After defeating the Mamluks and gaining control of the Mecca and Medina in 1517, the Ottoman sultan Selim I adopted the title. Rather than style himself the Ḥākimü'l-Ḥaremeyn (Arabic: حَاكِمُ الْحَرَمَيْن, Ruler of the Two Sanctuaries), he accepted the title Ḫādimü'l-Ḥaremeyn (Arabic: خَادِمُ الْحَرَمَيْن, Servant of the Two Sanctuaries).

The first King of Saudi Arabia to assume the title was Faisal (1906–1975). His successor Khalid did not use the title, but the latter's successor Fahd did, replacing the term "His Majesty" with it. The current king, Salman, took the same title after the death of King Abdullah, his half brother, on 23 January 2015.

== List of custodians ==
=== Ayyubids ===
- Saladin (Ṣalāḥ ad-Dīn Yūsuf ibn Ayyūb, 1137–1193)
- Al-Adil I (1200 – 1218)

=== Mamluks (1250–1517) ===
Baḥrī (Turkic) Mamluks (1250–1382)

1. Shajar al-Durr (r. 1250)
2. Izz ad-Din Aybak (r. 1250–1257)
3. Nur ad-Din Ali (r. 1257–1259)
4. Saif ad-Din Qutuz (r. 1259–1260)
5. Baibars (r. 1260–1277)
6. Al-Said Barakah (r. 1277–1279)
7. Solamish (r. 1279)
8. Qalawun (r. 1279–1290)
9. Al-Ashraf Khalil (r. 1290–1293)
10. An-Nasir Muhammad (1st reign: 1293–1294)
11. Kitbugha (r. 1294–1296)
12. Lajin (r. 1296–1299)
13. An-Nasir Muhammad (2nd reign: 1299–1309)
14. Baybars al-Jashnakir (r. 1309–1310)
15. An-Nasir Muhammad (3rd reign: 1310–1341)
16. Sayf ad-Din Abu Bakr (r. 1341)
17. Ala'a ad-Din Kujuk (r. 1341–1342)
18. Al-Nāṣir Aḥmad (r. 1342)
19. Imad ad-Din Abu'l Fida Isma'il (r. 1342–1345)
20. Sayf ad-Din Sha'ban (r. 1345–1346)
21. Sayf ad-Din Hajji (r. 1346–1347)
22. An-Nasir Hasan (1st reign: 1347–1351)
23. Salah ad-Din Salih (r. 1351–1354)
24. An-Nasir Hasan (2nd reign: 1354–1361)
25. Salah ad-Din Muhammad (r. 1361–1363)
26. Zayn ad-Din Sha'ban (r. 1363–1377)
27. Ala'a ad-Din Ali (r. 1377–1381)
28. Salah ad-Din Hajji (1st reign: 1381–1382)

Burjī (Circassian) Mamluks (1382–1517)

1. Barquq (1st reign: 1382–1389; 2nd reign: 1390–1399)
2. Nasir ad-Din Faraj (r. 1399–1412) (partial interruptions)
3. Izz ad-Din Abd al-Aziz (r. 1405)
4. Barsbay (r. 1422–1438)
5. Jaqmaq (r. 1438–1453)
6. Sayf ad-Din Inal (r. 1453–1461)
7. Khushqadam (r. 1461–1467)
8. Sayf ad-Din Bilbay (r. 1467)
9. Timurbugha (r. 1467–1468)
10. Qaitbay (r. 1468–1496)
11. Muhammad (r. 1496–1498; again 1498–1500)
12. Qansuh al-Ghawri (r. 1501–1516)
13. Tuman Bay II (r. 1516–1517)

=== Ottomans (1517–1924) ===
The Ottoman rulers from the conquest of the Mamluk Egypt in 1517, who claimed the caliphate until its abolition of in 1924 held the title "Custodian of the Two Holy Mosques":

1. Selim I (r. 1517–1520)
2. Suleiman I (r. 1520–1566)
3. Selim II (r. 1566–1574)
4. Murad III (r. 1574–1595)
5. Mehmed III (r. 1595–1603)
6. Ahmed I (r. 1603–1617)
7. Mustafa I (r. 1617–1618)
8. Osman II (r. 1618–1622)
9. Mustafa I (r. 1622–1623)
10. Murad IV (r. 1623–1640)
11. Ibrahim (r. 1640–1648)
12. Mehmed IV (r. 1648–1687)
13. Suleiman II (r. 1687–1691)
14. Ahmed II (r. 1691–1695)
15. Mustafa II (r. 1695–1703)
16. Ahmed III (r. 1703–1730)
17. Mahmud I (r. 1730–1754)
18. Osman III (r. 1754–1757)
19. Mustafa III (r. 1757–1774)
20. Abdul Hamid I (r. 1774–1789)
21. Selim III (r. 1789–1807)
22. Mustafa IV (r. 1807–1808)
23. Mahmud II (r. 1808–1839)
24. Abdülmecid I (r. 1839–1861)
25. Abdulaziz (r. 1861–1876)
26. Murad V (r. 1876)
27. Abdul Hamid II (r. 1876–1909)
28. Mehmed V (r. 1909–1918)
29. Mehmed VI (r. 1918–1922)
30. Abdülmecid II (caliph: 1922–1924) – last Ottoman caliph, titular custodian until the caliphate’s abolition

=== Hashemites (1924-1925) ===
1. Hussein bin Ali (March 1924–October 1924)
2. Ali bin Hussein (1924–1925)

=== Saudis (1964–1975) and (1986–present) ===
King Faisal was the first Saudi monarch to informally introduce and use the phrase "Custodian of the Two Holy Mosques" during his reign from November 2, 1964, until his death on March 25, 1975.

1. King Faisal bin Abdulaziz Al Saud (r. 1964–1975)

In 1986, King Fahd of Saudi Arabia replaced “His Majesty” with the title “Custodian of the Two Holy Mosques", restoring the latter title. All subsequent Saudi kings have continued to use it since then:

2. King Fahd bin Abdulaziz Al Saud (r. 1982–2005) – restored the title as a formal title in 1986

3. King Abdullah bin Abdulaziz Al Saud (r. 2005–2015)

4. King Salman bin Abdulaziz Al Saud (r. 2015–present)
