= Yalbugha al-Umari =

Egyptian Mamluk amir (died 1365)

Sayf ad-Din Yalbugha ibn Abdullah al-Umari an-Nasiri al-Khassaki, better known as Yalbugha al-Umari or Yalbugha al-Khassaki, was a senior Mamluk emir during the Bahri period. Originally a mamluk of Sultan an-Nasir Hasan (r. 1347–1351, 1354–1361), he rose through the ranks as the senior emirs Shaykhu and Sirghitmish were eliminated, becoming the amir majlis (lord of the audience, a senior administrative official), and achieving the highest military rank of amir mi'a muqaddam alf (emir of 100 mounted horsemen and commander of 1,000 soldiers). Ties between Yalbugha and an-Nasir Hasan deteriorated and the former had the latter, his master, killed in a violent power struggle in 1361.

After an-Nasir Hasan's elimination, Yalbugha became the most powerful figure in the sultanate of al-Mansur Muhammad (r. 1361–1363), who Yalbugha had a hand in appointing and under whom he served as atabeg al-asakir (commander in chief). His power was tempered by the other senior emirs, namely Taybugha al-Tawil. During these years, Yalbugha built up an enormous mamluk household of his own, consisting of some 3,000 mamluks in 1366, including the future sultan, Barquq. That same year, Yalbugha had Taybugha arrested and consolidated his rule. However, in December 1366, Yalbugha was killed by his own mamluks in a rebellion that was supported by then-sultan al-Ashraf Sha'ban (r. 1363–1377). He is buried in the mausoleum he constructed in Rawdah Island, Cairo.

== Biography ==
=== Early career ===
Yalbugha was purchased as a mamluk by Sultan an-Nasir Hasan, hence Yalbugha's second nisba (adjective denoting origin), "an-Nasiri". It is not clear when or from whom Yalbugha was purchased, but historian Jo van Steenbergen suggests that his first nisba, "al-Umari", indicates that he was purchased from the Cairene slave trader, Umar ibn Musafir, prior to the latter's death in 1353. Moreover, Steenbergen believes Yalbugha was purchased by an-Nasir Hasan in 1350, when the young sultan began to establish his own mamluk power base, according to Mamluk-era historian al-Maqrizi. Yalbugha was made part of an-Nasir Hasan's khassakiyya (a master's inner circle of mamluks), hence Yalbugha's third nisba, "al-Khassaki".

Following the ousting of an-Nasir Hasan in August 1351, Yalbugha likely served an-Nasir Hasan's younger brother and successor, Sultan as-Salih Salih (r. 1351–1354). An-Nasir Hasan returned to the throne in October 1354 after his brother was ousted by the senior Mamluk emirs Shaykhu and Sirghitmish, who acted as strongmen and virtual regents of the sultan. Yalbugha returned to an-Nasir Hasan's service and following Shaykhu's murder by one of the sultan's mamluks in November 1357, Yalbugha had his income increased and was promoted to the middle Mamluk rank of emir of forty (amir arba'in).

In August 1358, Sirghitmish was arrested by an-Nasir Hasan, thus allowing the sultan to assume actual power in his realm. He subsequently increased the power of his senior mamluks, including Yalbugha, who was promoted to the highest rank of emir of one hundred, commander of one thousand (amir mi'a muqaddam alf) and given a large and high-income iqta (fief). This promotion occurred almost concurrently with Yalbugha's assignment as amir majlis (lord of the audience) in place of an-Nasir Hasan's brother-in-law, Tankizbugha, who died in August 1358. As amir majlis, he was responsible for overseeing the sultan's governmental meetings and became significantly involved in the sultan's administration. With the elimination of Shaykhu and Sirghitmish, Yalbugha became the senior magnate of the sultanate, a status confirmed by the sultan giving him Sirghitmish's palatial residence on a hillside overlooking Cairo. From this commanding location and fortified headquarters, Yalbugha began building his own power base of mamluks.

=== Conflict with an-Nasir Hasan ===
Although information about the three years that followed Yalbugha's 1358 promotions is largely absent, it is clear that Yalbugha had consolidated his own retinue of mamluks. Tensions developed between an-Nasir Hasan and Yalbugha due to the former's concern of the latter's growing power. A number of narratives emerged in the Mamluk-era sources regarding the developments of March 1361, when Yalbugha allegedly killed an-Nasir Hasan. The contemporary narrative told by Ibn Kathir states that an-Nasir Hasan's extravagant spending and unpopular fiscal policies precipitated the confrontation between an-Nasir Hasan and Yalbugha. The sultan sought to eliminate Yalbugha, but the latter was prepared for such an event. Accordingly, Yalbugha and his mamluks confronted and defeated an-Nasir Hasan and his forces at the outskirts of Cairo, prompting an-Nasir Hasan's withdrawal to the citadel. There, he was surrounded by the entire Mamluk army in Cairo, and was arrested and sent to Yalbugha's residence after he attempted to escape.

A second, non-contemporary narrative, written by Ibn Taghribirdi, states that an-Nasir Hasan had grown deeply suspicious of Yalbugha as a result of incitement against the latter by the sultan's junior mamluks in his khassakiyya who accused Yalbugha of developing close ties with the eunuchs of the sultanate and giving them substantial power, unsanctioned by the sultan, and for distributing iqta to the women in his harem. Yalbugha began opposing an-Nasir Hasan in his decisions, many of which were unpopular in certain Mamluk circles. Like Ibn Kathir, Ibn Taghribirdi and the other Mamluk-era sources concur that an-Nasir Hasan attempted to arrest Yalbugha, but this backfired when the latter's forces defeated the sultan and ultimately had him sent to Yalbugha's residence. While most of the sources do not elaborate on what happened to an-Nasir Hasan afterward other than that he was never heard from again, al-Maqrizi asserts that Yalbugha had an-Nasir Hasan severely tortured, then killed and buried in a stone bench in his house where Yalbugha normally mounted his horse. Yalbugha's alleged murder of his former master was seen as breaking a mamluk taboo.

=== Strongman of Egypt ===
Following an-Nasir Hasan's elimination, Yalbugha and the senior emirs selected al-Mansur Muhammad, a grandson of Sultan an-Nasir Muhammad (r. 1310–1341), ending the series of an-Nasir Muhammad's sons acceding to the sultanate. Yalbugha became the most prominent emir in al-Mansur Muhammad's administration, alongside Emir Taybugha al-Tawil, another of an-Nasir Hasan's senior-most khassakiyya mamluks. Yalbugha was appointed atabeg al-asakir (commander in chief), a post which had become the second most influential office in the sultanate, preceded only by the sultan. In the early years of al-Mansur Muhammad's reign, Yalbugha had become the effective strongman of Egypt, although Ibn Taghribirdi suggested that his power was tempered by the other senior emirs, chief among them Taybugha, with whom Yalbugha made joint decisions. At the very least, Yalbugha had become a "first among equals", according to Steenbergen.

Yalbugha's power was challenged by the Mamluk governor of Damascus, Baydamur al-Khwarizmi, who declared a rebellion against him in Syria in the summer of 1361. In response, Yalbugha led a Mamluk army from Egypt to Syria that included al-Mansur Muhammad and the Caliph of Cairo al-Mu'tadid I. Yalbugha's show of force compelled Baydamur's partisans to defect, and Yalbugha achieved a major, albeit symbolic, victory. His return to Egypt with the sultan and the caliph was greeted with celebrations.

Yalbugha married an-Nasir Hasan's widow, Tulubay, a wealthy, ethnic Mongol, in the fall of 1361. Yalbugha likely married her in a bid to merge his household with that of the royal Qalawunids (descendants of Sultan Qalawun) whose members had acceded to the Mamluk throne since 1279. Ahmad, the son that Tulubay was rumored to have given birth before the marriage, was likely the son of an-Nasir Hasan, and thus a Qalawunid. In merging his household with the Qalawunids, Yalbugha sought royal legitimacy to supersede his peers in status and power. Yalbugha also proceeded to appropriate the wealth of the Qalawunid estate, using his close relationship with Ibn Qazwina, a Coptic convert to Islam and the wazir (financial vizier) of the sultan, to achieve that end.

In 1363, Yalbugha, Taybugha and the senior emirs deposed al-Mansur Muhammad and replaced him another grandson of an-Nasir Muhammad, al-Ashraf Sha'ban. With the abundant financial resources of the sultanate at his disposal, Yalbugha built up a formidable mamluk corps, known in modern sources as the "Yalbughawiyya", whose ranks consisted of different groupings of mamluks, including those purchased by Yalbugha and those who came from dissipated mamluk households. He instituted rigorous martial training for his mamluks, whose numbers rivaled and in some cases exceeded the mamluk retinues of the Qalawunid sultans; by 1366 they numbered around 3,000 mamluks. Among his mamluks were Barquq, who become sultan in 1382. Yalbugha instituted training and educational reforms that rolled back the permissiveness of an-Nasir Muhammad's reign and aimed to restore the discipline and organization of the mamluk regiments. His policy was similar to that introduced by the previous sultans Baybars and Qalawun. The harshness of his methods and his excessive punishment of mamluks for minor offenses would later provoke a rebellion against him by his mamluks.

=== Downfall and death ===
In October 1365, Peter I of Lusignan, the king of Cyprus, launched a surprise invasion of Alexandria. In response, Yalbugha undertook major efforts to reconstruct the Mamluk navy. In less than one year and despite the dearth of building material, Yalbugha managed to oversee the production of one hundred warships, each carrying 150 sailors and a number of mamluks. In November 1366, Yalbugha held a ceremony in the Nile River to demonstrate the size of his navy and regain the legitimacy that was lost in the aftermath of the invasion of Alexandria. However, the vessels were not put into action against Cyprus as ostensibly intended.

Prior to the navy's reconstruction, in late February 1366, the mamluk factions of Yalbugha and Taybugha entered into major clashes in the outskirts of Cairo, ending years of peaceful cooperation between the two emirs as they competed for supremacy in the sultanate. Yalbugha's forces were victorious and Taybugha and his partisans were imprisoned in Alexandria. With Taybugha out of the political scene, Yalbugha consolidated his power over the sultanate's affairs, installing his emirs, relatives and junior mamluks in important administrative and military offices.

On 8 December, an attempt was made on Yalbugha's life while he was on a hunting trip in the outskirts of Cairo. He consequently fled to his Cairo residence the next day and attempted to prevent the spread of a rebellion against him by members of his own mamluk faction supported by Sultan al-Ashraf Sha'ban. In the proceeding days, mamluk rebels commandeered vessels from the reconstructed navy and soon after engaged in naval warfare in the Nile (between Cairo and Gaza) with Yalbugha's other vessels, which were manned by his loyalists. One day during the hostilities, a captain of Yalbugha, Muhammad ibn Bint Labtah, defected with 30 ships to the rebels. Together, the rebels attempted to cross the east bank of the Rawda Island and enter Yalbugha's camp, but they were repelled by naphtha artillery and arrows. On 12 December, al-Ashraf Sha'ban and the rebels managed to cross the Nile and rendezvous with their comrades in Cairo.

On 14 December, Yalbugha was captured. In an apparent ruse, they brought him a horse to escape their custody, but as soon as he mounted it, one of his mamluks, Qaratamur, beheaded him with his sword. Afterward, the other mamluks of Yalbugha attacked his body, "cutting him to pieces" and placing his bleeding head "in a torch for the bleeding to stop" to the point that his entire head became disfigured, according to the Mamluk-era chronicler Ahmad al-Bayruti. At nightfall, one of Yalbugha's loyalists and his dawadar, Tashtamur, retrieved his head and body and had it buried in the mausoleum Yalbugha had built in Rawda Island.

The motive behind Yalbugha's death was attributed to his attempt to return to the traditional methods of mamluk training, which the mamluks perceived to be harsh and unjust. His death at their hands precluded any similar initiatives by later Bahri emirs for fear of sharing Yalbugha's fate. According to historian Amalia Levanoni, while Baybars and Qalawun faced little mamluk opposition in their training methods, by the time Yalbugha emerged to emulate them, the mamluks had been long accustomed to the laxness of an-Nasir Muhammad's reign and were unwilling to forfeit their material improvement for the sake of disciplinary or organizational reform.

== Domestic policies ==
Throughout his rule in the 1360s, Yalbugha was known for his religious patronage and charitable efforts. He was a strong supporter of Sunni Islam's Hanafi school of jurisprudence (fiqh), and oversaw the growth of the Hanafi school in Egypt. He had Hanafi judicial posts established in Cairo and Alexandria, and Hanafi madrasas or teaching posts built in Cairo and Mecca. During Yalbugha's time, conversion from the Shafi'i school to the Hanafi school increased significantly, although this trend preceded Yalbugha, with the emirs Shaykhu and Sirghitmish also having been major patrons of Hanafi institutions. The trend continued after Yalbugha's death through the end of the sultanate.

Among his engagements with Mamluk society outside of the realm of politics were his distribution of money and food to Muslim law students and the pupils of Sufi mystics in 1363, his financing of irrigation networks in Giza in 1364, and his relief of food shortages and resultant starvation in Mecca in 1365. In the latter situation, several relief caravans were sent to Mecca carrying hundreds of tons of wheat to distribute among the inhabitants to stem increasing emigration from the city. He also decreased taxes on Hajj pilgrims, compensating the Mamluk emirs of Mecca who depended on the pilgrim tax with revenue from iqta in Egypt, in addition to 40,000 silver dirhams to the governor of Mecca. This decree was inscribed on a stone column in the Masjid al-Haram mosque in Mecca.

Road security in Syria deteriorated during Yalbugha's effective rule due to the depredations of nomadic Arab and Turkmen tribesmen whose iqta were confiscated by Yalbugha's orders. Nomadic tribesmen also launched major raids against Aswan in Upper Egypt, killing numerous inhabitants and bringing ruin to the city. Roads in Upper Egypt were also left insecure due to the frequent nomadic raids against travelers there. In response to the Crusader assault against Alexandria in 1365, Yalbugha punished the Christian inhabitants of Egypt, confiscating valuables and landed property from Christian commoners and monks alike, including some 12,000 crosses.

== Bibliography ==
- Levanoni, A. (1995). A Turning Point in Mamluk History: The Third Reign of Al-Nāṣir Muḥammad Ibn Qalāwūn (1310–1341). Brill. ISBN 9789004101821.
- Mayer, L.A. (1933). Saracenic Heraldry: A Survey. Oxford: Oxford University Press. (pp. 11, 8 5, 90, 146, 228, 249*, 254)
- Steenbergen, Jo Van (2011). "On the Brink of a New Era? Yalbughā al-Khāṣṣakī (d. 1366) and the Yalbughāwīyah" (PDF). Mamluk Studies Review. 15. Middle East Documentation Center, The University of Chicago: 117–152.
- Steenbergen, Jo Van (September 2011). "The Amir Yalbughā al-Khāṣṣakī, the Qalāwūnid Sultanate, and the Cultural Matrix of Mamlūk Society: A Reassessment of Mamlūk Politics in the 1360s". Journal of the American Oriental Society. 131 (3). American Oriental Society: 423–443. JSTOR 41380710.
