= Auri =

Auri may refer to:

- Auri, Latvia, a village in the historical region of Semigallia
- Auri, Uttar Pradesh, a village in Uttar Pradesh, India
- Auri (band), a Finnish band formed in 2017
  - Auri (album), 2018
- Acacia auriculiformis, a tree species
- Lablab purpureus, a bean species also known as Indian bean
- Indonesian Air Force, formerly AURI, currently TNI–AU
- Auri (footballer) (born 1973), Auri Dias Faustino, Brazilian footballer
- Auri, a character from The Kingkiller Chronicle series of books

== See also ==
- Auris (disambiguation)
