= Aurus =

Aurus may refer to:

- Baybugha or Aurus (fl. 14th century), Mamluk emir
- Aurus Mountain, a mountain in Namibia
- Aurus Motors, a Russian automobile company

== See also ==
- Auris (disambiguation)
