= Baybugha =

Sayf ad-Din Baybugha Rus al-Qasimi an-Nasiri (also known as Baybugharus or Aurus) was a prominent Mamluk emir during the reigns of sultans as-Salih Isma'il, al-Muzaffar Hajji, an-Nasir Hasan and as-Salih Salih.

== Biography ==
Baybugha was a mamluk of Sultan an-Nasir Muhammad. According to historian David Ayalon, Baybugha was one of the few mamluks to have ethnic Rus origins. He is first mentioned by Mamluk-era historians during the reign of an-Nasir Muhammad's son, as-Salih Isma'il. During the reign of the latter's brother and successor, al-Muzaffar Hajji, Baybugha became the amir majlis (lord of the audience), a relatively high-ranking office which was responsible for overseeing the sultan's physicians and oculists. In 1347, he was promoted to na'ib al-saltana (viceroy) of Egypt.

During the reign of Hajji's successor, an-Nasir Hasan, another son of an-Nasir Muhammad, Baybugha, as na'ib al-saltana, was among the four senior emirs who actually ruled the Mamluk state. The other three were Baybugha's brother Manjak al-Yusufi (com), Shaykhu an-Nasiri and Taz an-Nasiri (com), all former mamluks of an-Nasir Muhammad. During his viceroyship, in 1348, Baybugha decreed that the sons of fief holders could inherit the fiefs from their fathers. The decree endeared him to the population. While on Baybugha was making the Hajj pilgrimage to Mecca with Taz, an-Nasir Hasan attempted to assert his authority over the senior emirs, and had Baybugha arrested. He was imprisoned in al-Karak.

An-Nasir Hasan was overthrown in September 1351 and replaced by his half-brother as-Salih Salih. The latter freed Baybugha and appointed him na'ib (governor) of Aleppo in 1351, replacing Emir Arghun al-Kamili. The following year, Baybugha incited a rebellion by the Mamluk emirs in Syria against the sultan. The latter responded by leading a military expedition against the rebellious emirs, and he succeeded in arresting Baybugha, along with the nuwab (governors) of Safad, Hama and Tripoli. Baybugha was incarcerated in the Aleppo Citadel in 1353, and was executed later that year.

He was married to Shaqra (d. 1389), a daughter of An-Nasir Hasan.

== Bibliography ==
- Al-Harithy, Howyda N. (1996). "The Complex of Sultan Hasan in Cairo: Reading Between the Lines". In Gibb, H.A.R.; E. van Donzel; P.J. Bearman; J. van Lent (eds.). The Encyclopaedia of Islam. BRILL. ISBN 9789004106338.
