= Sirghitmish =

Mamluk emir (died 1358)

Sayf ad-Din Sirghitmish ibn Abdullah an-Nasiri, better known as Sirghitmish (also spelled Sarghitmish) (died 1358) was a prominent Mamluk emir during the reign of Sultan an-Nasir Hasan (r. 1347–1351, 1354–1361). By 1357, Sirgitmish was the most powerful emir in an-Nasir Hasan's court. That year, he had the Madrasa of Sirghitmish built in Cairo. In 1358, the sultan's suspicions of a coup plot by Sirghitmish led to his imprisonment and subsequent death.

== Biography ==
=== Political career ===
Sirghitmish was a mamluk purchased by Sultan an-Nasir Muhammad (r. 1310–1341). He began his career under Sultan al-Muzaffar Hajji (r. 1346–1347), a son of an-Nasir Muhammad. In March/April 1352, in a spiritual bid to recover from an illness, which had lasted for a few days, Sirghitmish donated large alms to the impoverished and freed a certain number of prisoners. He rose to prominence during the second reign of an-Nasir Muhammad's son, an-Nasir Hasan, which began in 1355. Sirghitmish and Emir Shaykhu had led the coup against Sultan as-Salih Salih and the strongman Taz an-Nasiri and restored an-Nasir Hasan to the throne. Sirghitmish and Shaykhu were the major figures in an-Nasir Hasan's court and held the reins of power. Sirghitmish's authority was strengthened when Shaykhu was killed by dissident mamluks in 1357. That year he purchased the town of Amman in Transjordan and assigned it as the district capital of Balqa, part of the province of Damascus. Ownership of Amman would remain in Sirghitmish's family until they sold it in 1394.

While Sirghitmish was the most powerful figure in the royal court, an-Nasir Hasan sought to assert his authority and oust Sirghitmish. After imprisoning or exiling Shaykhu's mamluk faction, he moved against Sirghitmish, who he believed was plotting to topple him. Sirghitmish was arrested in 1358 and jailed in Alexandria. He died there later that year. Afterward, the presence of Sirghitmish's mamluk faction, which according to Ibn Iyas numbered 800 mamluks, was suppressed in the royal court and replaced by an-Nasir Hasan's own mamluks and supporters. One of Sirghitmish's sons, Ibrahim, would later become an emir of ten, i.e. a low-ranking Mamluk officer in 1363, during the reign of Sultan al-Mansur Muhammad.

=== Cultural patronage ===
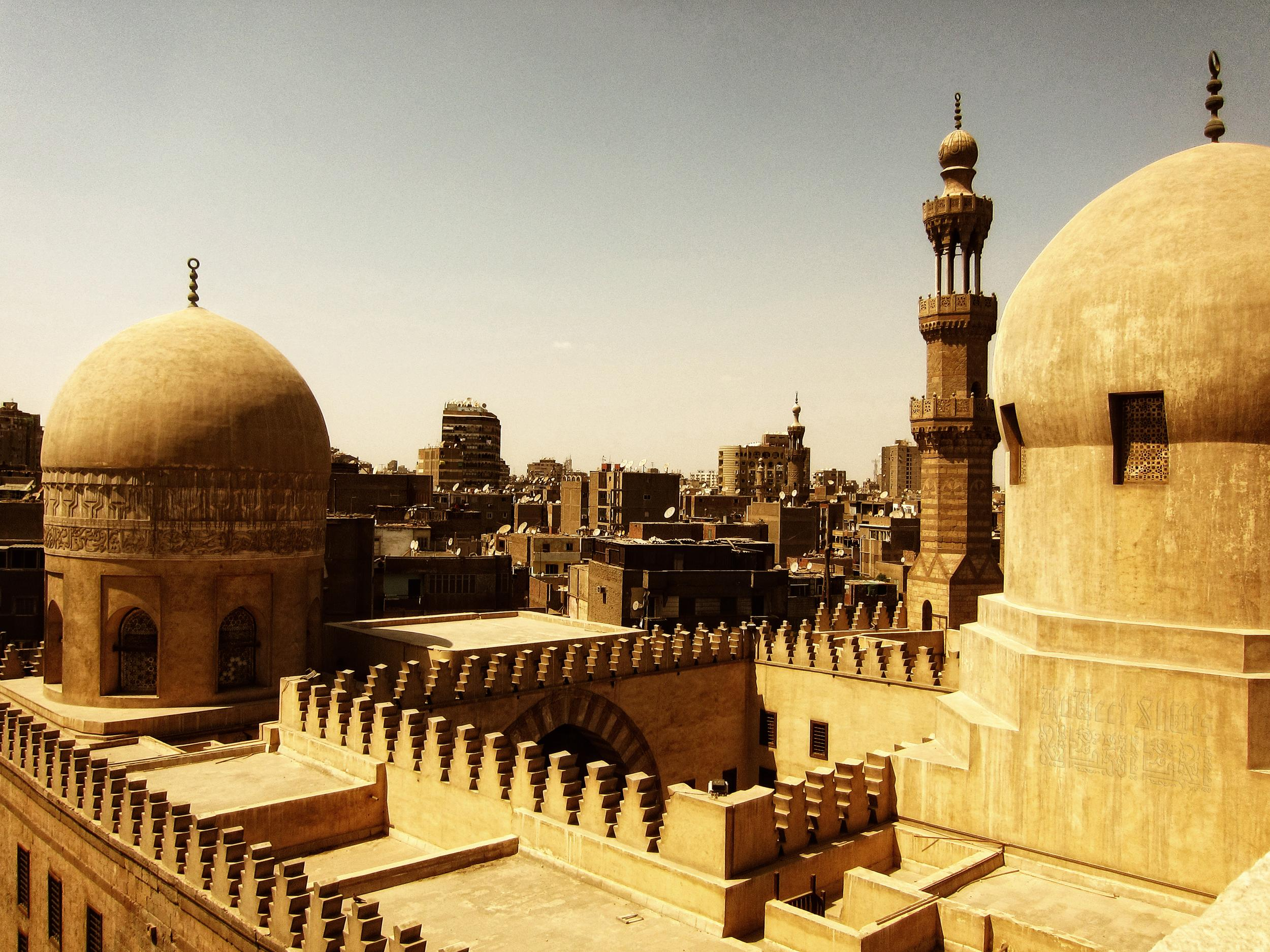
The Madrasa of Sirghitmish in Cairo, built in 1356

Sirghitmish studied the Arabic language and was well-versed in the Qur'an and calligraphy. He also studied Islamic jurisprudence, and favored the Hanafi madhab (school of thought) of Sunni Islam. Nonetheless, he valued the work of non-Hanafi scholars as well, and showed particular favoritism to the Persian members of the ulama (Muslim scholarly establishment). Persian culture influenced his architectural and cultural patronage.

In 1356 Sirghitmish commissioned the construction of the Madrasa of Sirghitmish (also known as the "Sarghitmishiya Madrasa") in Cairo. The madrasa (Islamic college) consists of four large iwans, ostensibly for the four madhabs of Sunni Islam, although the madrasa was only used by the Hanafi madhab. A feature of Sirghitmish's madrasa unique to similar institutions in Cairo was that a dome was built atop the central portion of the qibla iwan. Another feature not typically seen in Cairene mosques or madrasas is the minaret's bi-colored inlaid masonry. Sirghitmish's son Ibrahim died in 1368/69 and was buried in the madrasa.

== Bibliography ==
- Al-Harithy, Howyda N. (1996). "The Complex of Sultan Hasan in Cairo: Reading Between the Lines". In Gibb, H.A.R.; E. van Donzel; P.J. Bearman; J. van Lent (eds.). The Encyclopaedia of Islam. BRILL. ISBN 9789004106338.
- Mayer, L.A. (1933). Saracenic Heraldry: A Survey. Oxford: Oxford University Press. (pp. 14, 208−210)
