= Mosque and Khanqah of Shaykhu =

Mosque and Islamic complex in Cairo, Egypt

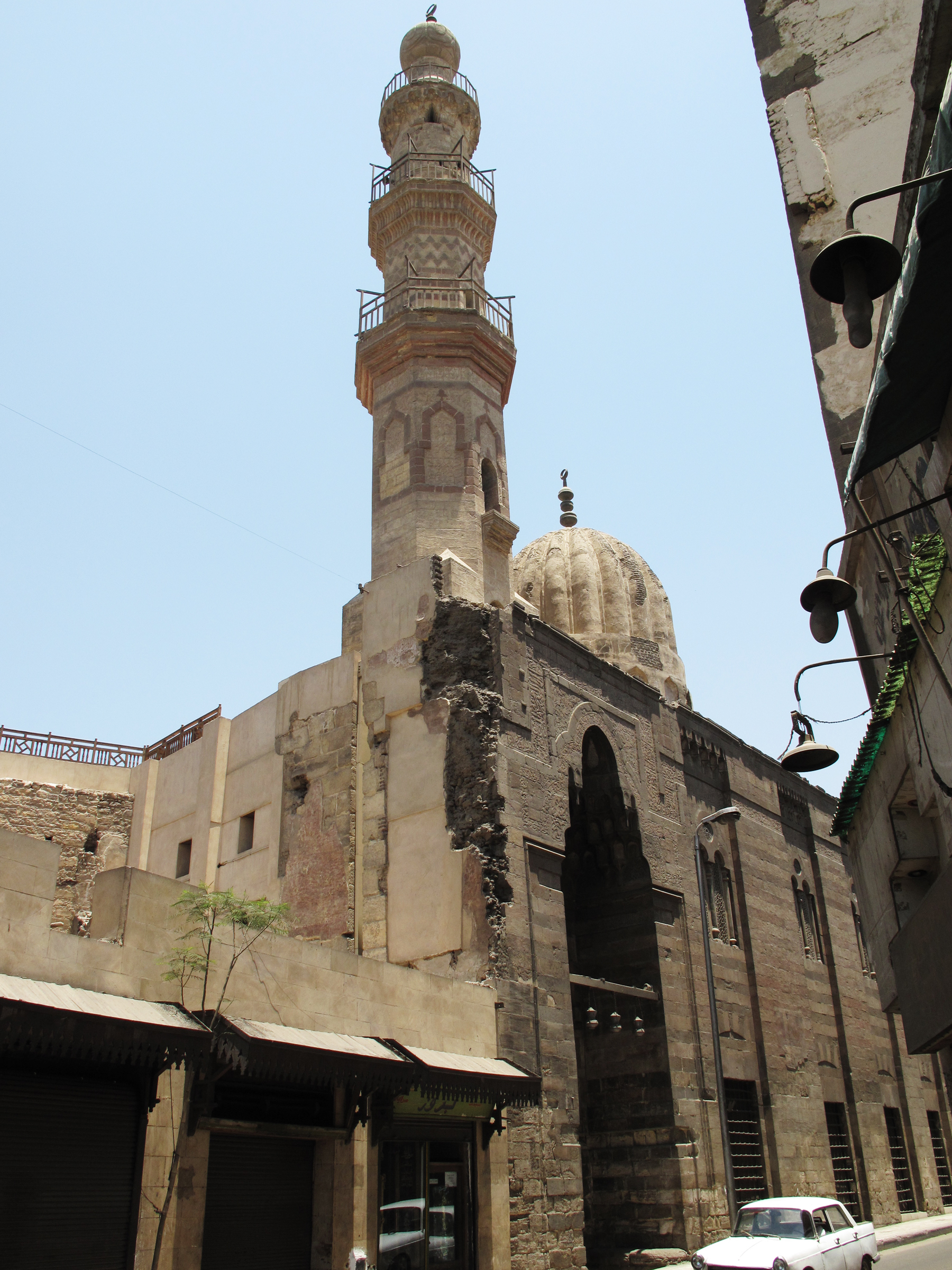

Religion
- Affiliation: Sunni Islam
- Sect: Sufism
- Ecclesiastical or organisational status: Mosque; Khanqah
- Status: Active

Location
- Location: Saliba Street, Islamic Cairo
- Country: Egypt
- Interactive map of Mosque and Khanqah of Shaykhu
- Coordinates: 30°01′50″N 31°15′11″E

Architecture
- Type: Mosque
- Style: Mamluk
- Founder: Sayf al-Din Shaykhu al-Nasiri
- Completed: 1349 CE (mosque); 1355 CE (khanqah)

Specifications
- Dome: 1
- Minaret: 1
- Shrine: 1: (Shaykhu)

The Mosque and Khanqah of Shaykhu is a mosque and khanqah, located on Saliba Street, in Islamic Cairo, Egypt. Completed in 1349 and 1355 respectively, the mosque and khanqah were founded by Sayf al-Din Shaykhu al-Nasiri, the Grand Emir under the rule of Sultan an-Nasir Hasan.

== Life of Shaykhu ==
Sayf al-Din Shaykhu al-Nasiri was the major political authority and one of the most celebrated amirs in the state of Sultan Hasan. The supervision of the state was in his control and he focused on policies leading to the stability of the nation and peace between the different groups of people living in the region. He enjoyed prestige and acquired an enormous fortune through his daily income of 200,000 dirhams or 10,000 dinars.

Shaykhu was assassinated in 1357 CE. Bey, the amir Manjak vizier, one of the Sultan’s Mamluks, attacked Shaykhu with a sword while Shaykhu was sitting at the House of Justice. The people in the Cairo Citadel panicked, causing so much turmoil throughout the crowd that people were killed. Bey was seized in the Mausoleum of al-Nasir, outside of Cairo, by ten of the grand amirs in full armour. Bey confessed and took full responsibility.

“He said: I brought to Shaykhu a request for a transfer from salary to landed property, but he did not gratify my concern. That decision had an overpowering influence on my soul.”

Bey was imprisoned before his execution by being impaled and afterwards his corpse was circulated through the streets. Shaykhu was not killed instantly by the attack but never recovered and died on the night of Friday, the 16th day of Dhu al-Qa’da in 758 AH (1356/1357 CE). Shaykhu is buried in his own khanqah and supplied the funds so that the Qur’an would be perpetually read at his tomb.

== Architecture ==
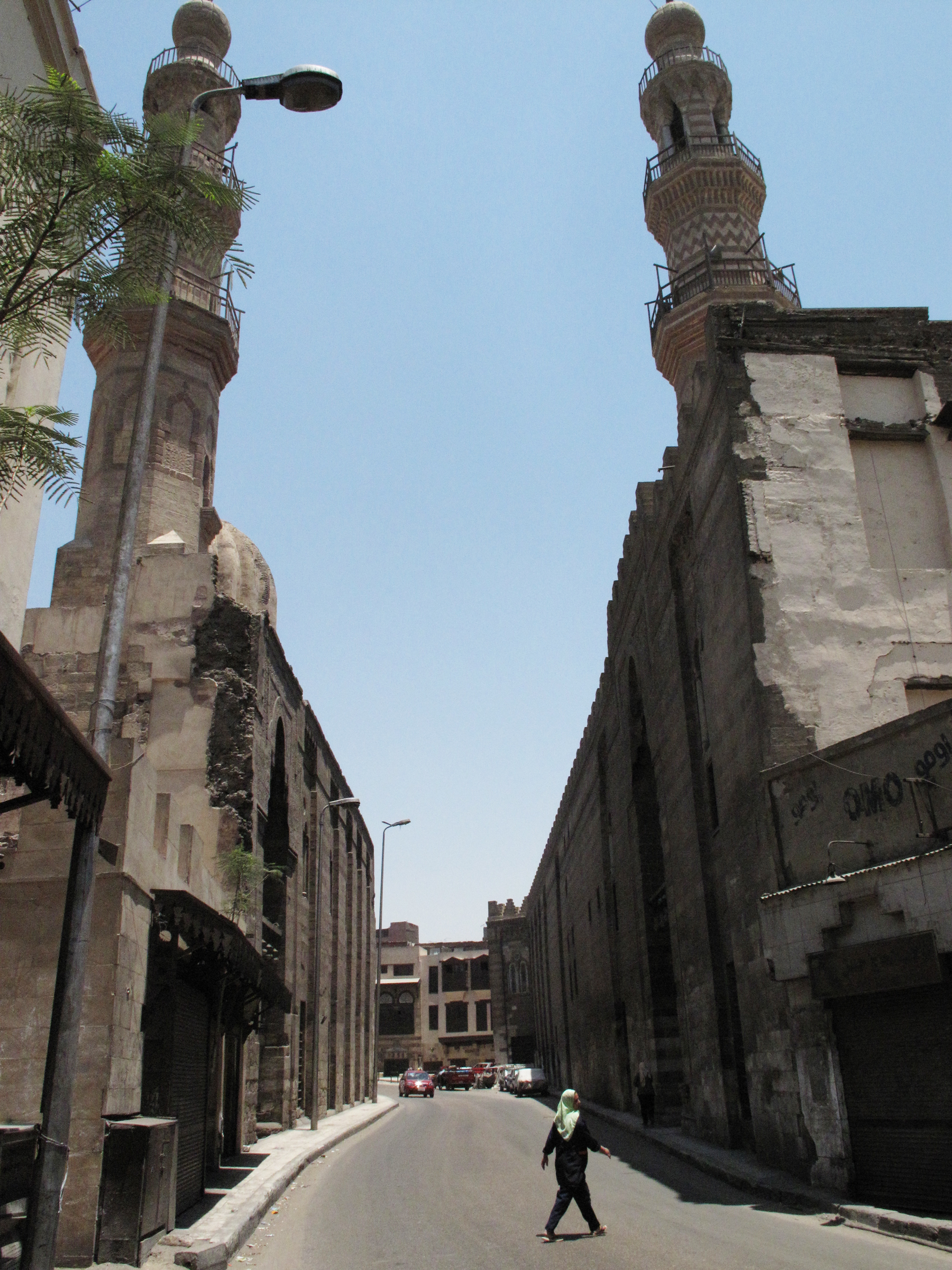
Mosque and Khanqah of Shaykhu

“Although the khanqah and the mosque of Shaykhu are separated by six years, they have similar facades, portals, and minarets. The two buildings face each other across Sharia Saliba with almost identical exterior aspects, yet the interiors serve completely different purposes. By flanking - and thus framing - the street, the two opposing minarets and portals produce the effect of a monumental gate rendering the segment of the processional al-Saliba Street, defined by these two parallel facades, part of the complex of Shaykhu”.

=== Mosque ===
Al-Maqrizi called this “mosque is one of the most sublime mosques in Egypt.” It is located opposite the Khanqah. The foundation is said to have been built for Shaykh Akmal al-Din al-Rumi, who was the principal of twenty Sufis attached to it and was ultimately buried within the khanqah. The mosque has an unusual layout and instead of increasing wall thickness to maintain internal symmetry, as was the standard practice, the prayer hall has an irregular shape with walls that are not parallel. The walls shadow the layout of the surrounding streets and “this unconventional layout allows the mausoleum to communicate with the sanctuary through a window”. This window replaced the mausoleum’s mihrab. The courtyard of the mosque is the earliest extant in a riwaq mosque to be paved with polychrome marble. Most of the mosque’s original work has gone under restoration, however, the mihrab contains remains of the polychrome marble of the era. The lower segment of the mihrab displays eighteenth century Tunisian tiles. Maqrizi also made the claim that “no previous mosque and khanqah, in the area of Saliba, has thrived to this extent, nor was there ever created in the Bahri Mamluk state the equal to their pious endowments and the excellence of their incomes”.

=== Khanqah ===
The khanqah is located in the area of al-Saliba, outside Cairo proper. It is directly opposite the Mosque of Shaykhu, which it is associated with. It was built in 756 AH (1355/1356 CE), six years after the Mosque by Shaykhu, with the intention that it would serve as both a madrasa and a khanqah. It is the earliest known khanqah-madrasa of the Mamluk period. It had the capability to house residences of the general populace. In addition to the khanqah, there were also two baths and a row of stores with small residences in the second story above the shops constructed by Shaykhu.

He arranged lectures of each of the four legal schools (Shafi‘i, Hanafi, Maliki, and Hanbali), a lecture on the hadith of the prophet, and a lecture on the seven readings of the Qur’an. He assigned a teacher and a group of students to each lecture. Shaykhu “appointed as teacher of the Shafi‘i legal scholars Baha’ al-Din Ahmed ibn ‘Ali al-Subki; for the Maliki legal scholars, the Shaykh Khalil, who had a military manner and ran the study group like his own fief; for the Hanbali legal scholars, the chief judge Muwaqqif al-Din al-Hanbali. He installed our Shaykh Akmal al-Din Muhammad ibn Mahmoud as head of the khanqah and teacher of the Hanafis. He also organized and financed food for the students and a monthly allotment of basic necessities. The reputation of the khanqah grew across the region and many notable persons of learning from the era graduated from there. It had the prestige of increasing its prosperity beyond every pious endowment in Egypt. This surplus ultimately led to the khanqah’s downfall, as the Sultan al-Nasir Faraj confiscated the money. The condition of the khanqah, once meticulously kept, declined until falling behind in payments promised to the holders of various positions needed to support the khanqah.

The building took seven months to complete. A faddan of land is 4,200 square metres (45,000 sq ft) and Shaykhu acquired a little more than that for the khanqah and surrounding baths and shops. The foundation inscription in the entrance portal mentions the founder’s name with the humble sufi attribute ‘al-‘abd al-faqir’ which translated means ‘the poor slave.’ The inscription on the khanqah’s minaret differs from the mosque, as the khanqah includes the Qur’an passage XXII, 27 referring to the Hajj under the title “The Pilgrimage:” “Proclaim the Pilgrimage to all people. They will come to you on foot and on every kind of swift mount, emerging from every deep mountain pass”. Presumably, the khanqah was used to host foreign travelers passing through Cairo on their way to Mecca.

The khanqah is constructed around a courtyard, with an arcaded prayer hall on one side and living units occupying three floors on the other three sides. Instead of increasing the thickness of the wall to even out the irregular shape of the building, the prayer hall is extended past the courtyard along the street, which is similar to the style of the mosque, creating an additional space in the eastern corner, covered by a wooden dome. This is the tomb of Akmal al-Din, who died during the reign of Sultan Barquq in 786 AH (1384/1385 CE). The Sultan revered Akmal al-Din that he ordered his burial within the khanqah, not a common occurrence for a shaykh, but Akmal al-Din was the supervisor of the endowment and even Shaykhu might have stipulated the location of his burial. Shaykhu himself is reportedly buried within the khanqah, indicating that he changed his mind after the completion of the mausoleum attached to his mosque. This modification would be coherent with his self-view as a Sufi, as expressed in the foundation inscription of the Sufi monastery he built.

== See also ==
- Islam in Egypt
- List of madrasas in Egypt
- List of mosques in Cairo
- List of Historic Monuments in Cairo
- Late medieval domes
