= Gardene =

Village in Latvia

Coordinates: 56°39′N 23°13′E

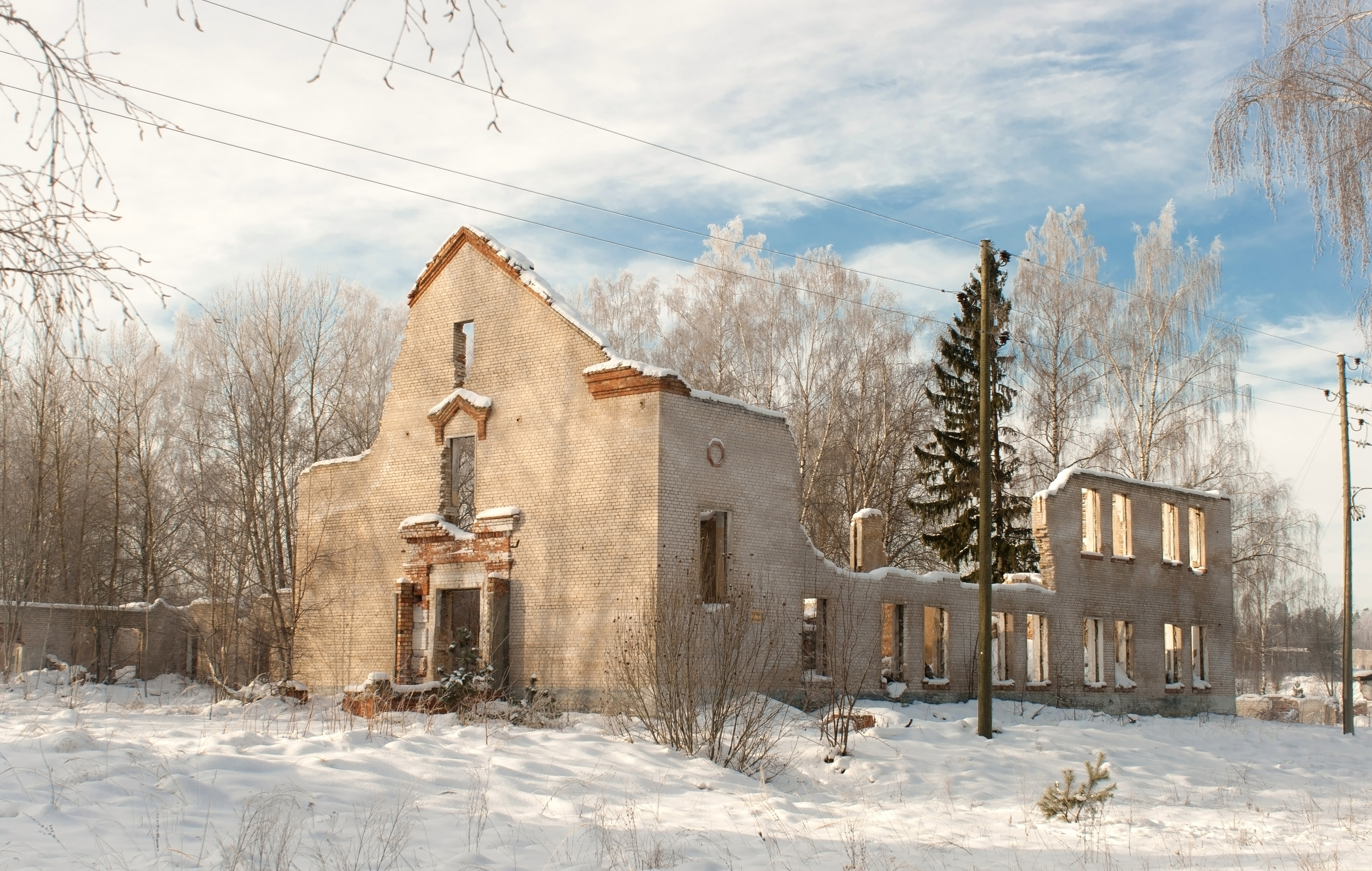
- Ruins of the housing of a Soviet base
- Interactive map of Gardene
- Country: Latvia
- Municipality: Dobele Municipality
- Parish: Auri Parish

Gardene is a village in the Auri Parish of Dobele Municipality in the historical region of Semigallia, and the Zemgale Planning Region in Latvia. It is the site of a former Soviet military base.
