= Lielbērze =

Village in Latvia

Coordinates: 56°39′N 23°15′E

Lielbērze is a village in the Auri Parish of Dobele Municipality in the Semigallia region and the Zemgale Planning Region in Latvia.

== Notable people ==
- Lizete Iesmiņa-Mihelsone, actress and opera singer
