= Bērzkrasti =

Village in Latvia

Coordinates: 56°35′45″N 23°17′20″E

Bērzkrasti is a village in the Auri Parish of Dobele Municipality in the Semigallia region of Latvia, and the Zemgale Planning Region.
