= Liepziedi =

Village in Latvia

Coordinates: 56°37′24.52″N 23°15′53.54″E

Liepziedi is a village in the Auri Parish of Dobele Municipality in the Semigallia region and the Zemgale Planning Region in Latvia.
