= Black Death in the Middle East =

1346-1353 spread of the Black Death

The Black Death was present in the Middle East between 1347 and 1349. The Black Death in the Middle East is described more closely in the Mamluk Sultanate, and to a lesser degree in Marinid Sultanate of Morocco, the Sultanate of Tunis, and the Emirate of Granada, while information of it in Iran and the Arabian Peninsula is lacking. The Black Death in Cairo, at the time the biggest city in the Mediterranean region, was one of the biggest documented demographic catastrophes during the Black Death.

== Background ==
=== The Middle East in the mid-14th century ===
In the mid-14th century, most of the Middle East was controlled by the Mamluk Sultanate, which composed present day Egypt, Palestine, Lebanon, and Syria, having the Jalayirid Sultanate (present day Iraq and Iran) in the East, and the Hafsid Sultanate of Tunis (Tunisia) and Marinid Sultanate (Morocco) in North Africa to the West.

=== The Black Death ===
Since the outbreak of the Black Death at the Crimea, the plague, according to traditional history, had reached the Italian Peninsula and Europe by a plague ship to Sicily in 1347.

== Plague migration ==
=== Egypt ===
In the autumn of 1347, a ship carrying the plague came to Alexandria in Egypt, from which it spread over Northern Egypt during the spring of 1348, reaching its peak between October 1348 and January 1349. The plague resulted in widespread panic, in which the peasantry fled to the cities to escape the plague, while in parallel the city people fled to the country side, which created chaos and a collapse of public order.

In September 1348 the plague reached Cairo, which at this time was the biggest city in the Middle East and the Mediterranean world, as well as bigger than any city in Europe. The Mamluk sultan An-Nasir Hasan fled the city and stayed in his residence Siryaqus outside of the city between the 25 September and 22 December, when the Black Death was present in Cairo. The Black Death in Cairo resulted in the death of 200,000 people, which were a third of the population of the city, and resulted in several quarters of the city becoming depopulated quarters of empty ruins during the following century.

In early 1349, the plague reached South Egypt, where the population in the region of Asyut changed from 6,000 taxpayers before the plague to 116 after. It is noted however, that a lot of the peasantry of South Egypt fled to the cities during the Black Death, and refused to return to work on the estates of the landlords when it was over.

=== Palestine ===
In April–May 1348, the Black Death migrated from Northern Egypt to the city of Gaza in Palestine, where the population fled to the countryside, after which their homes were pillaged by criminals, who themselves died, while the peasants outside of the city reportedly fell down dead in their fields during their plowing.

=== Syria ===
In the Summer of 1348, the Black Death had reached Damascus in Syria. In Damascus, processions of prayer as well as fasting were organized, and both Muslims, Christians and the Samaritans participated in public praying processions to appeal to God to prevent the plague. The number of deaths soon reached so many thousands that funerals could, for a long time period, no longer be arranged. Bodies were stacked in gardens and on the street, and on 31 October 1348, Ibn Abī Ḥajalah noted that 263 bodies were stacked in the Umayyad Mosque. When the Black Death reached Antakya, a great deal of the population fled from the city, but reportedly, their horses returned to the city without their owners, who were later found dead of the plague on the road from the city.

The Black Death was described by Ibn Battuta, who was in Aleppo in June 1348 when he was informed that the plague had reached Gaza, and travelled there via Homs, to which the plague had reached at the time, and arrived in Jerusalem, where the plague had already passed when he arrived, having killed almost all of the people with whom he had been acquainted with during his last visit.

=== North Africa ===
In April 1348, Sultan Abu al-Hasan Ali ibn Othman of the Marinid Sultanate of Morocco, was defeated by the Arab tribes near Kairouan and retreated toward Tunis; and because the Black Death is noted to be present in Tunis in June 1348, and broke out in Fez in Morocco when the Marinid army returned there from Tunis, it is believed to have moved with the army.

== Economic, social and political effects ==
The contemporary Muslim theologists regarded the plague as a punishment from God if it targeted a non-Muslim; if it killed a Muslim however, it was in contrast regarded as a sign of favor from God, who wished to award a devout Muslim with the death of a martyr. This was the accepted official attitude toward the pandemic, and since the Black Death was regarded as a gift from God, there were no measures taken by the authorities to prevent the spread of the pandemic, to isolate the affected or to evacuate from the plague. Instead, the authorities remained passive and their official recommendation was to meet the plague with prayer.

In reality, however, regardless of the recommendations of the authorities and theologies, many people fled the plague and attempted to protect themselves from it, and the idea that the plague was a punishment from God for human sins was prevalent among private Muslims regardless of the official view of the authorities: Ibn al-Wardi openly put forward this view. There were also individuals who opposed the passivity of the authorities and attempted to find ways to avoid the plague, such as Ibn al-Khatib, who recommended that the illness could be avoided with isolation and quarantine, which however resulted in him being accused of heresy.

== Consequences ==
As expected the Black Death repeatedly returned, and Egypt was affected 58 times between 1347 and 1517. The depopulation resulted in lower income from taxes, and that the irrigation system was not maintained and collapsed, resulting in less agriculture. Especially in Southern Egypt, the country side was depopulated. However, in the cities the craftsmen were given better living conditions because they were fewer, which were similar to Western Europe.

In Cairo, several quarters of the city were left depopulated, and the ruins of empty quarters of the city were described far in to the following 15th-century. In 1434, the traveller Bertrandon de la Broquière described areas in Syria as empty, and Venetian envoys in Syria in the 15th-century reported about an almost abandoned agriculture.
