= Auri Parish =

Parish of Latvia

- parish of Latvia
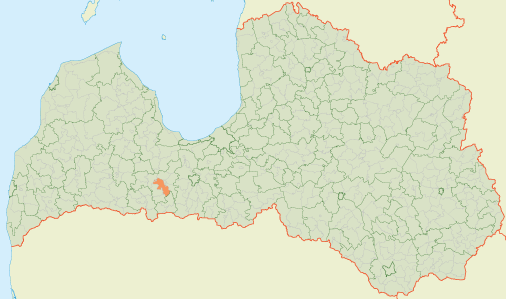
- 56°35′23″N 23°14′41″E
- Country: Latvia

Area
  - Total: 110.10 km^{2} (42.51 sq mi)
  - Land: 107.08 km^{2} (41.34 sq mi)
  - Water: 3.02 km^{2} (1.17 sq mi)

Population (1 January 2026)
  - Total: 2,690
  - Density: 25.1/km^{2} (65.1/sq mi)

Auri Parish (Latvian: Auru pagasts) is an administrative unit of Dobele Municipality in the Semigallia region of Latvia. The administrative center is the village of Auri.

== Towns, villages and settlements of Auri Parish ==
- Gardene
- Ķirpēni
- Auri (parish center)
- Liepziedi
- Lielbērze
- Bērzkrasti
- Rūpnieki
