= Ķirpēni =

Village in Dobele Municipality, Latvia

Coordinates: 56°32′N 23°20′E

Ķirpēni is a village in the Auri Parish of Dobele Municipality in the Semigallia region of Latvia, and the Zemgale Planning Region.
