= Lizete Iesmiņa-Mihelsone =

Latvian actress and opera singer

Div' dūjiņas gaisā skrēja
Div’ dūjiņas gaisā skrēja, performed by Lizete Iesmiņa-Mihelsone

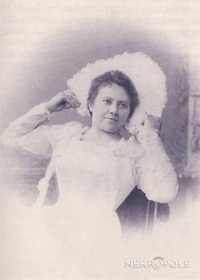
Lizete-Iesmina-Mihelsone

Lizete Iesmiņa-Mihelsone (23 September 1872 – 3 July 1934) was a Latvian actress and opera singer.

Iesmiņa-Mihelsone was born in Lielbērze, Russian Empire. At the age of 15, she began singing at the Jelgava Church Choir, from 1889 at the Latvian Society Choir in Jelgava. Her career as an actress and soprano stretched over almost 30 years; 1895–1918 at the Riga Latvian Theatre, and then for some years at the Latvian National Theatre. She was married to architect Aleksandrs Mihelsons. Iesmiņa-Mihelsone died in Riga, Latvia, and is buried at the Forest Cemetery in Riga.
