= Div' dūjiņas gaisā skrēja =

Latvian folk song composed by Dāvids Cimze

Div' dūjiņas gaisā skrēja
Performed by Lizete Iesmiņa-Mihelsone (1872–1934)

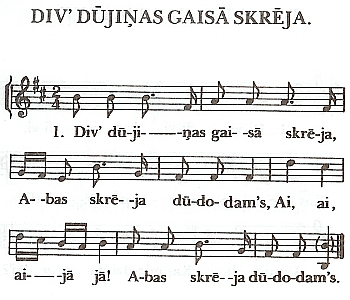
Sheet music of Div' dūjinas gaisā skrēja

Div' dūjiņas gaisā skrēja (English: Two doves bolted into the blue) is the title of a traditional Latvian folk song that is best known as a musical composition by Dāvids Cimze.

== Lyrics ==
Latvian

Div' dūjiņas gaisā skrēja,
Abas skrēja dūdodam's.
Ai, ai, aijajaijā
Abas skrēja dūdodam's.

Div' bāliņi kaŗā jāja,
Abi jāja domādam'.
Ai, ai, aijajaijā
Abi jāja domādam'.

Vai būs jāti vai nejāti,
Vai palikti sētiņā.
Ai, ai, aijajaijā
Vai palikti sētiņā.

Kur palika mans bāliņis —
Karodziņa nesējiņš?
Ai, ai, aijajaijā
Karodziņa nesējiņš?

Tur aizgāja, tur palika
Uz tām prūšu robežām
Ai, ai, aijajaijā
Uz tām prūšu robežām

Tur staigāja Dieva dēli
Dvēselītes lasīdam.
Ai, ai, aijajaijā
Dvēselītes lasīdam.

Atraduši dvēselīti,
Ietin baltā villainē.
Ai, ai, aijajaijā
Ietin baltā villainē.

Ienes klusā pavēnī,
Guldin' Dieva šūpulī.
Ai, ai, aijajaijā
Guldin' Dieva šūpulī.

Aijā, mīļa dvēselīte,
Kaŗā kauta — nemirus'.
Ai, ai, aijajaijā
Kaŗā kauta — nemirus'.

English

Two doves bolted into the blue
Both cooing as they rose.
Ai, ai, aijajaijā
Both cooing as they rose.

Two brothers rode off to war
Pondering as they rode.
Ai, ai, aijajaijā
Pondering as they rode.

Should they ride or should they not —
Or stay in their homestead?
Ai, ai, aijajaijā
Or stay in their homestead?

Where did my brother dear go —
The bearer of our banner?
Ai, ai, aijajaijā
The bearer of our banner?

Thence he marched and now remains
In the Prussian borderlands.
Ai, ai, aijajaijā
In the Prussian borderlands.

There strolled the sons of God
Gathering up souls.
Ai, ai, aijajaijā
Gathering up souls.

And so, the soul they came upon
They enveloped in a white woolen shawl.
Ai, ai, aijajaijā
They enveloped in a white woolen shawl.

They conveyed it to the tranquil shade
To lay into the cradle of God.
Ai, ai, aijajaijā
To lay into the cradle of God.

Slumber, dear beloved soul
Felled in war — never dead.
Ai, ai, aijajaijā
Felled in war — never dead.

=== Notes on the translation ===
- verse 1—skrēja translates most literally as "ran", here in the sense of dashing up into the air, this is the only verse in the translation which does not repeat the verb consistently within the verse.
