= Al-Nasir Hasan =

Mamluk sultan of Egypt (1347–1351, 1355-1361)

Badr ad-Din Hasan
- Al-Malik al-Nasir

Sultan of Egypt
- Reign: December 1347 – August 1351
- Predecessor: Al-Muzaffar Hajji
- Successor: Al-Salih Salih

(second period)
- Reign: October 1354 – 17 March 1361
- Predecessor: Al-Salih Salih
- Successor: Al-Mansur Muhammad
- Born: 1334/35; Cairo, Mamluk Sultanate
- Died: 17 March 1361 (age 27)
- Spouse: Tulubiyya bint Abdullah al-Nasiri
- Issue: Ahmad; Qasim; Ibrahim; Ali; Iskandar; Sha'ban; Isma'il; Yahya; Musa; Yusuf; Muhammad
Names
- Al-Malik al-Nasir Badr ad-Din Hasan ibn Muhammad ibn Qalawun
- House: Qalawuni
- Dynasty: Bahri
- Father: Al-Nasir Muhammad
- Religion: Islam

Al-Nasir Badr ad-Din Hasan ibn Muhammad ibn Qalawun (1334/35–17 March 1361), better known as al-Nasir Hasan, was the Mamluk sultan of Egypt, the seventh son of al-Nasir Muhammad to hold office, reigning twice in 1347–1351 and 1354–1361. During his first reign, which he began at age 12, senior Mamluk emirs formerly belonging to al-Nasir Muhammad, dominated his administration, while al-Nasir Hasan played a ceremonial role. He was toppled in 1351 when he attempted to assert executive authority to the chagrin of the senior emirs. He was reinstated three years later during a coup against his brother Sultan al-Salih Salih by emirs Shaykhu and Sirghitmish.

During his second reign, al-Nasir Hasan maneuvered against the leading emirs, gradually purging them and their supporters from the administration through imprisonment, forced exile and execution. He replaced many mamluks (manumitted slave soldiers) with awlad al-nas (descendants of mamluks), who he found to be more reliable, competent and amiable with the public. Al-Nasir Hasan was killed by one of his own mamluks, Yalbugha al-Umari, who headed a faction opposed to al-Nasir Hasan's elevation of the awlad al-nas. Throughout his second reign, al-Nasir Hasan commenced the Sultan Hasan Mosque-Madrasa complex in Cairo, as well as other architectural works, namely religious structures, in Cairo, Jerusalem, Gaza and Damascus.

== Early life and family ==
Al-Nasir Hasan's birth name was 'Qamari' (also spelled 'Qumari') in Cairo in 1334/35; he changed his given name to 'Hasan' upon his accession to the sultanate in 1347. According to historian Ulrich Haarmann, his revocation of his Turkic name and replacement with the Arabic 'Hasan' was meant to dissociate himself from the predominantly Turkic mamluks, a symbolic act in line with his policy of minimizing the role of mamluks in the state and relying instead on the descendants of mamluks, known as awlad al-nas. He was the son of Sultan al-Nasir Muhammad (r. 1310–1341) and his Tatar wife, Kuda, who died while al-Nasir Hasan was an infant. He was raised by his mother-in-law Khawand Urdukin in the Cairo Citadel, the sultanate's administrative headquarters. In 1341, al-Nasir Muhammad died and a succession of his sons acceded to the throne, with real power often being held by the rival emirs of al-Nasir Muhammad's inner circle.

Al-Nasir Hasan was married to Tulubiyya (d. 1363), a daughter of one of his father's emirs, Abdullah al-Nasiri. With her and possibly other wives or concubines, al-Nasir Hasan had eleven sons and six daughters. His sons were Ahmad (d. 1386), Qasim (d. 1358), Ibrahim (d. 1381), Ali, Iskandar, Sha'ban (d. 1421), Isma'il (d. 1397), Yahya (d. 1384), Musa, Yusuf and Muhammad. Of his six daughters, only Shaqra (d. 1389) was named in the sources. She married Emir Baybugha al-Qasimi (also known as Aurus), one of the principal emirs of the sultanate during al-Nasir Hasan's reign.

== Sultan of Egypt ==
=== First reign ===
Following the death of al-Nasir Hasan's half-brother, al-Muzaffar Hajji, in a confrontation with Circassian mamluks in December 1347, al-Nasir Hasan acceded to the sultanate as 'al-Malik al-Nasir Hasan' at the age of 12, having been installed in power by senior Mamluk emirs. The emirs had appointed al-Nasir Hasan in haste, having rejected the nomination of al-Amjad Husayn, another of al-Nasir Muhammad's sons and the mamluks favorite for succession. Al-Nasir Hasan's role was ceremonial, with actual power being wielded by the following four Mamluk emirs: na'ib al-saltana (viceroy) Baybugha al-Qasimi, ustadar (chief of staff) and Baybugha's brother, Manjak al-Yusufi (com), and the emirs Shaykhu al-Nasiri and Taz al-Nasiri (com). Al-Nasir Hasan's first year as sultan coincided with the Black Death in Egypt, which peaked in October–December 1348 and ended in February 1349. In 1350, al-Nasir Hasan attempted to assert his executive power by assembling a council of the four qadis (chief judges), declaring to them that he had reached adulthood and thus no longer required the emirs' guardianship. He concurrently dismissed Manjak as wazir (vizier) and ustadar. However, al-Nasir Hasan's attempt to assert administrative authority was stifled by Taz a few months later.

In August 1351, Taz maneuvered to have al-Nasir Hasan replaced by his half-brother al-Salih Salih and put under house arrest in his mother-in-law Khawand's living quarters in the citadel's harem. Al-Nasir Hasan spent his confinement in leisure, studying Islamic theology, particularly the work of the Shafi'i scholar al-Bayhaqi, Dala'il al-Nubuwwah ("The Signs of Prophethood"). Al-Nasir Hasan was also known to be highly skilled in Arabic and compared to his predecessors, he was a more cultured figure.

=== Second reign ===
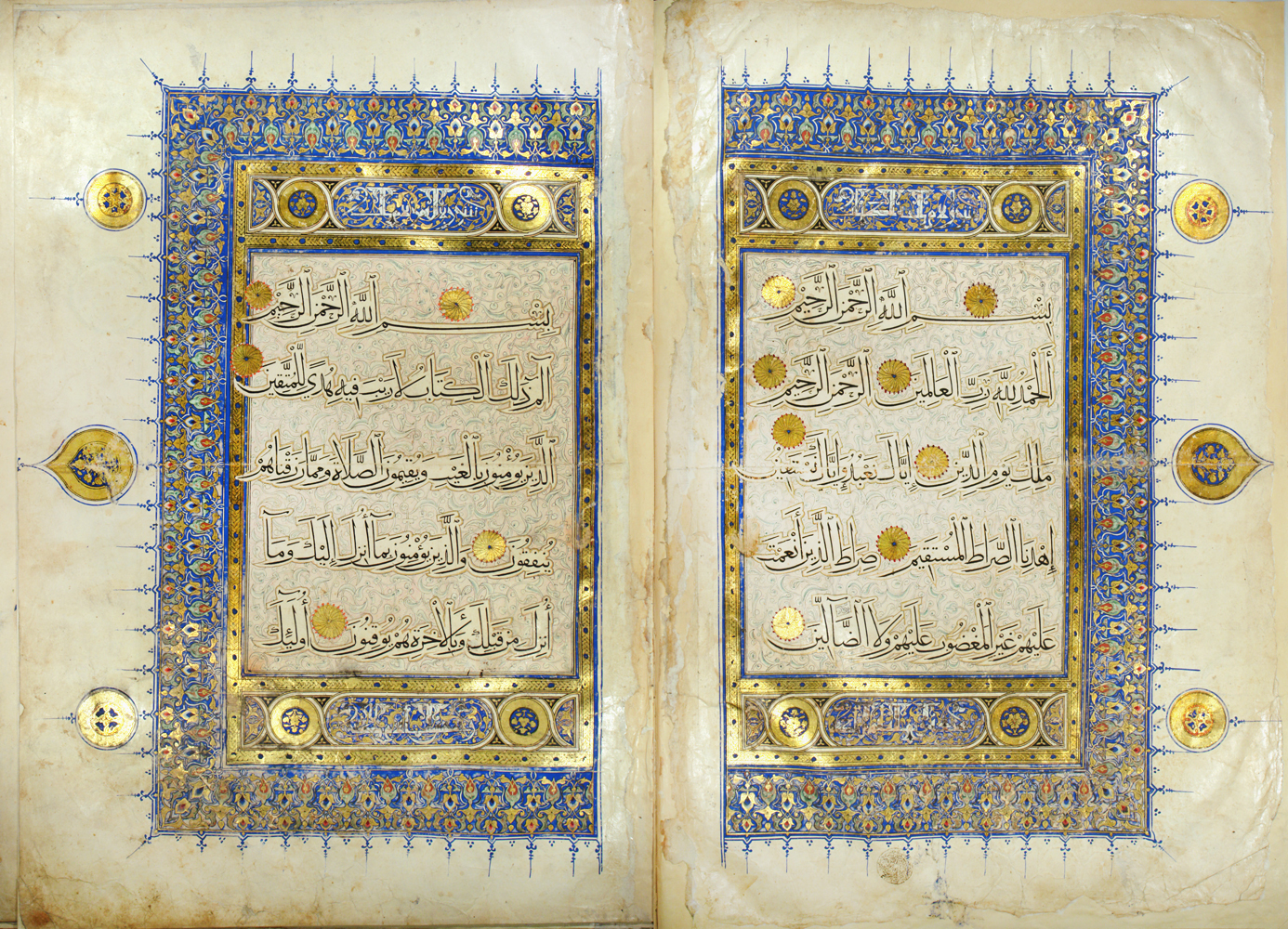
Illuminated opening from the Qur'an commissioned by sultan Al-Hasan for his Complex. This manuscript is part of the National Library of Egypt's Collection of Mamluk Qur'an Manuscripts inscribed in the UNESCO Memory of the World Register

Under Salih's three-year reign, Taz was the strongman of the sultanate until he was ousted in a coup by Shaykhu and Emir Sirghitmish al-Nasiri in 1355. In October of that year, al-Nasir Hasan was restored to the sultanate. Al-Nasir Hasan's second reign was marked by efforts to monopolize executive power by ridding his administration of its powerful and fractious emirs. His first major action in this regard was to imprison Taz, but after the intervention of Shaykhu, who, along with Sirghitmish, wielded considerable influence Hasan's court, al-Nasir Hasan agreed to appoint Taz as na'ib of Aleppo instead. In effect, Taz was exiled from Cairo, but was spared incarceration. In November 1357, Shaykhu was killed, and following the latter's death, al-Nasir Hasan made moves, namely through forced exile, to hinder the authority of Shaykhu's partisans, who were led by Khalil ibn Qawsun. Those among Shaykhu's mamluk partisans who were not exiled, were imprisoned in Alexandria.

Al-Nasir Hasan's political maneuvers left Sirghitmish as the most powerful emir in al-Nasir Hasan's court. In order to eliminate the potential of a coup by Sirghitmish, al-Nasir Hasan had him imprisoned in Alexandria in August 1358, and he was later killed while incarcerated. Al-Nasir Hasan proceeded to purge Sirghitmish's mamluks from the military and administrative posts they occupied and replaced them with his own mamluks, as well as awlad al-nas. His promotion and installment of awlad al-nas to high ranks and senior offices was unprecedented in the sultanate's history. Ten of the twenty-four Mamluk generals holding the highest military rank of amir mi'a (emir of one hundred [mamluk cavalrymen]) were awlad al-nas. Awlad al-nas and non-mamluk eunuchs held numerous senior administrative posts, including the many provincial governorships of the sultanate's Syrian region, including the niyaba (provinces) of Aleppo and Safad. Among those who reached the rank of amir mi'a were two of al-Nasir Hasan's sons.

Al-Nasir Hasan's stated purpose behind elevating the awlad al-nas was his strong trust in their reliability and his belief that they were less prone to rebellion than mamluks. Other reasons he integrated the awlad al-nas into the sultanate's administrative hierarchy were the generally better treatment of Mamluk subjects by awlad al-nas and their better comprehension of administrative regulations. Al-Nasir Hasan's recruitment experiment with the awlad al-nas was ultimately unsuccessful and short-lived according to historian Peter Malcolm Holt. However, historian Ulrich Haarmann asserts that a'-Nasir Hasan's demise "in no way impeded the further strengthening of the position of the awlad al-nas in the military and the administration", but only under the Bahri regime, which ended in the last years of the 14th century.

== Death ==
On 17 March 1361, Hasan was killed at age 27 by one of his own mamluks, Yalbugha al-Umari, who led a mamluk faction opposed to al-Nasir Hasan's policy of elevating the awlad al-nas to positions of authority. In Mamluk-era commentary regarding al-Nasir Hasan's death, it was stated that "his murder ... came at the hands of his closest mamluks and confidants ... he had purchased and fostered them, given them riches and appointed them to the highest offices."

According to historian Carl F. Petry, al-Nasir Hasan and Sultan al-Ashraf Sha'ban were "perhaps the exception" among al-Nasir Muhammad's largely powerless descendants who acceded to the throne because they wielded real power, and al-Nasir Hasan in particular was the only descendant of al-Nasir Muhammad to have "had a significant impact on events" in the sultanate. The Mamluk historian al-Maqrizi lauded him as "one of the best kings of the Turks".

== Building works ==
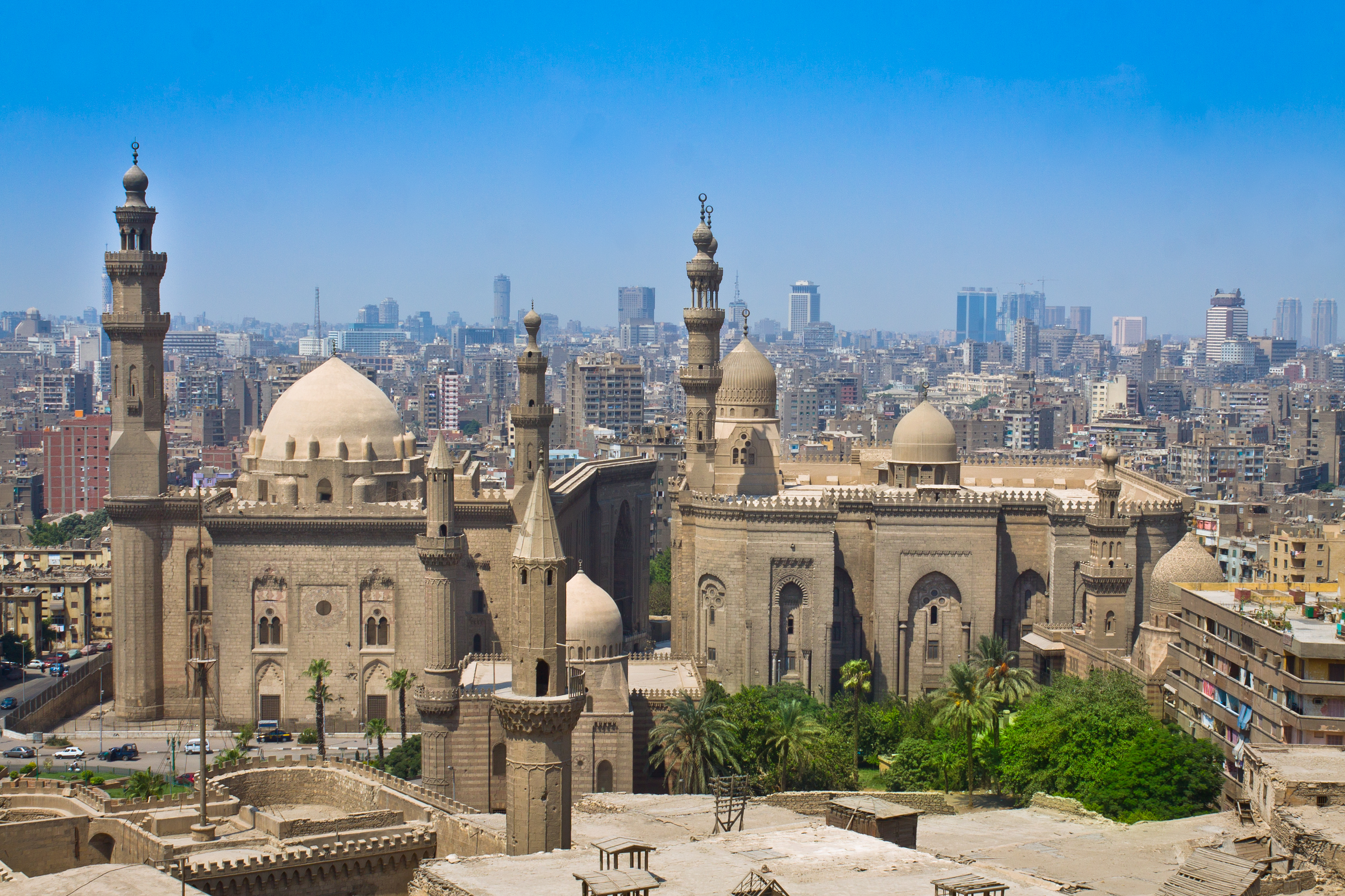
The Sultan Hasan Mosque and Madrasa, commissioned by al-Nasir Hasan in 1357 and completed in 1363

In line with the favoritism he showed to Muslim scholars in his court, al-Nasir Hasan was responsible for the construction of a massive mosque-madrasa complex bearing his name, known today as the Sultan Hasan Mosque and Madrasa, in Rumaila, Cairo. Construction of the complex began in 1357 and was worked on daily at the expense of 20,000 silver dirhams a day for the following three years. Construction continued following al-Nasir Hasan's death under the patronage of his senior aide, Bashir Agha al-Jamdar, who oversaw the complex's completion in 1363. The complex was described by al-Maqrizi as a sanctuary with no equals among the mosques and madrasas of Egypt, Syria, Iraq, North Africa or Yemen. Likewise, Mamluk historians Ibn Taghribirdi and Ibn Shahin describe the complex as having no equal in the world, while Ibn Habib described it as superior in greatness to the Pyramids of Giza. Western travelers Pietro Della Valle and Jean Thevenot both described it as the finest mosque they had ever seen.

The complex's construction was noted to be remarkable by the modern historian Oleg Grabar because in his opinion, the complex's patron, al-Nasir Hasan, was a generally weak leader for much of his reign and construction of the expensive complex occurred at a time of severe economic instability in the aftermath of the Black Plague in Cairo. Mamluk historian Ibn Iyas wrote that most of the funds for the complex derived from a huge treasure of gold found under the site, but Egyptian historian Howayda Al-Harithy contends that the funds likely came from mass appropriations of property by al-Nasir Hasan from plague victims who left no legal heirs. Al-Nasir Hasan chose the complex's site from the two palaces built by his father for his emirs Altunbugha al-Maridani and Yalbugha al-Yahyawi, demolishing both to make way for the complex.

A double-mausoleum structure in Cairo's Southern Cemetery (the Qarafa or City of the Dead), known as the Sultaniyya Mausoleum, is also attributed to Sultan Hassan and was dedicated to this mother.

Starting in 1360, al-Nasir Hasan commenced other architectural projects in the sultanate, including the Qa'a al-Baysariyya tower at the Cairo Citadel, described by al-Maqrizi as a structure unique in Mamluk architecture. The Qa'a al-Baysariyya was a high, domed tower decorated with bejeweled gold bands. Other projects included a madrasa complex in Jerusalem in 1361, and sabil-kuttabs (public fountains attached to open galleries where the Qur'an was taught) in Jerusalem, Gaza, Damascus and other towns. Al-Nasir Hasan also commissioned a major renovation of the al-Aqsa Mosque in Jerusalem.

== Bibliography ==
- Armstrong, Karen (1997). Jerusalem: One City, Three Faiths. Ballantine Books. ISBN 9780345391681.
- Haarmann, Ulrich (1998). "Joseph's law — the careers and activities of Mamluk descendants before the Ottoman conquest of Egypt". In Philipp, Thomas; Haarmann, Ulrich (eds.). The Mamluks in Egyptian Politics and Society. Cambridge University Press. ISBN 9780521591157.
- Al-Harithy, Howyda N. (1996). "The Complex of Sultan Hasan in Cairo: Reading Between the Lines". In Gibb, H.A.R.; E. van Donzel; P.J. Bearman; J. van Lent (eds.). The Encyclopaedia of Islam. BRILL. ISBN 9789004106338.
- Holt, Peter Malcolm (1986). The Age of the Crusades: The Near East from the Eleventh Century to 151. Addison Wesley Longman Limited. ISBN 9781317871521.
- Levanoni, Amalia (1995). A Turning Point in Mamluk History: The Third Reign of Al-Nāṣir Muḥammad Ibn Qalāwūn (1310-1341). Brill. ISBN 9789004101821.
- Petry, Carl F. (1998). The Cambridge History of Egypt, Vol. 1: Islamic Egypt, 640-1517. Cambridge University Press. ISBN 9780521068857.

Regnal titles
Preceded by Al-Muzaffar Hajji	Mamluk Sultan; December 1347–August 1351	Succeeded by Al-Salih Salih
Preceded by Al-Salih Salih	Mamluk Sultan; October 1355–1361	Succeeded by Al-Mansur Muhammad
