= Shaykhu =

Mamluk leader in Egypt (died 1357)

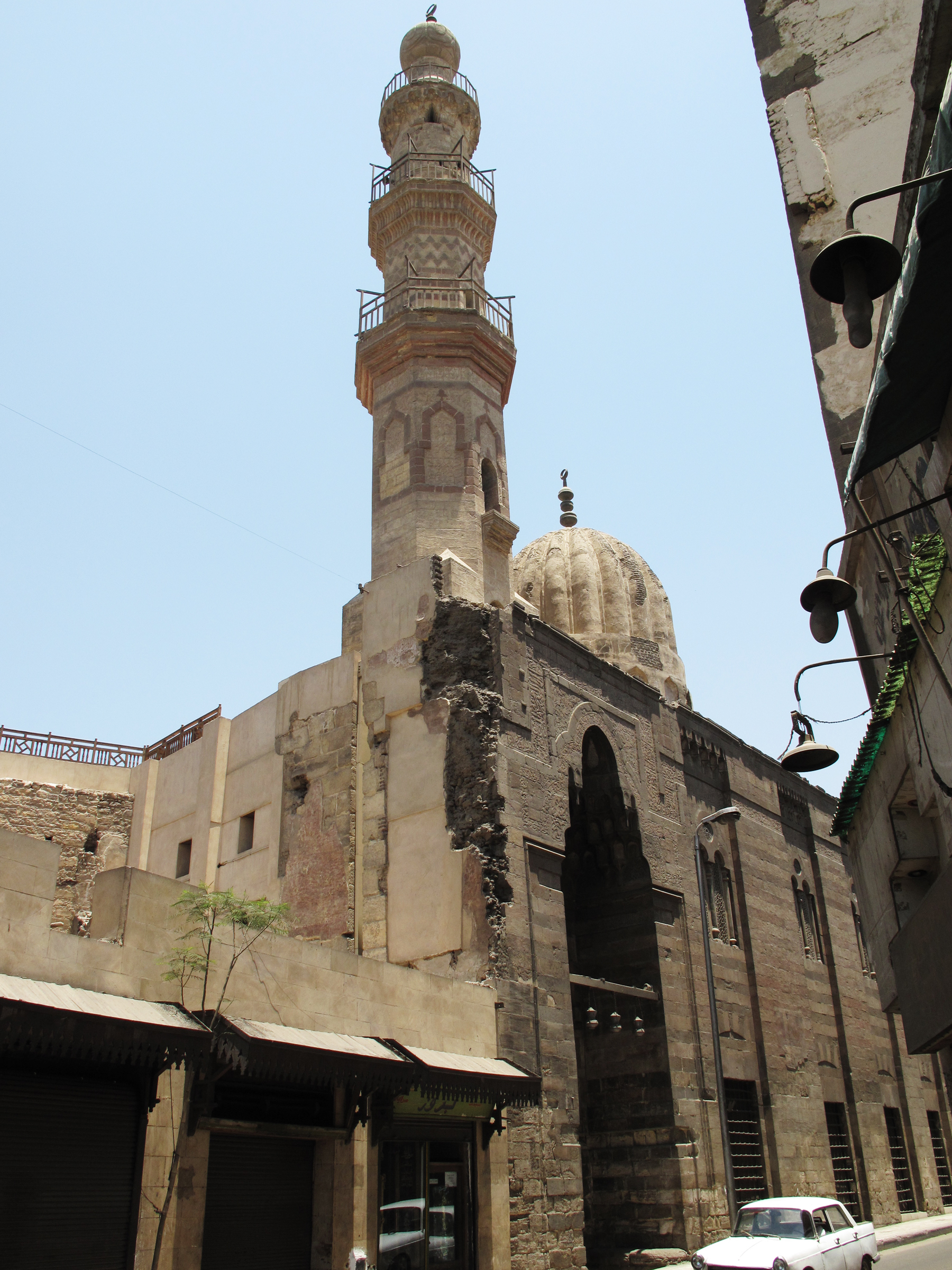
Mosque and Khanqah of Shaykhu, in Cairo

Shaykhu al-Umari an-Nasiri (died October 1357) was a high-ranking Mamluk emir during the reigns of sultans al-Muzaffar Hajji (1346–1347), an-Nasir Hasan (1347–1351, 1355–1361) and as-Salih Salih (1351–1355).

== Biography ==
Shaykhu began his career as a mamluk (manumitted slave soldier) during the third reign of Sultan an-Nasir Muhammad (r. 1310–1341). Shaykhu rose to become a high-ranking emir under Sultan al-Muzaffar Hajji (r. 1346–1347). During the first term of the latter's child successor, an-Nasir Hasan, Shaykhu emerged as one of the four influential Mamluk emirs who wielded power in the sultanate. An-Nasir Hasan moved to assert his authority over the emirs in 1350 by arresting Shaykhu and Emir Manjak al-Yusufi (com), imprisoning them both in Alexandria. Shaykhu was pardoned in 1351 following Hasan's ouster and replacement by Sultan as-Salih Salih and the strongman of the sultanate, Emir Taz an-Nasiri (com). Shaykhu returned to Cairo where he and Taz effectively held the levers of power and supervised the affairs of the state. During this three-year period (1352–1355), Shaykhu commissioned the construction of a sabil kuttab (public fountain where the Qur'an was taught) in Cairo.

Relations soured between Shaykhu and Taz, leading with the former gaining the upper hand and together with Emir Sirghitmish an-Nasiri, deposing as-Salih Salih and restoring Hasan to the sultanate. Taz was soon after imprisoned on Hasan's orders, but Shaykhu compelled Hasan to assign him to Aleppo as governor instead, effectively exiling Taz. Shaykhu was appointed atabak al-asakir (commander in chief of the military) by Hasan, giving him considerable power in the sultanate. During this time, he was the first person to hold the title of emir kabir (great commander). In 1355, Shaykhu had a mosque bearing his name built in Cairo, between Rumeila Square and the Ibn Tulun Mosque. November 1357, Shaykhu was murdered in a council meeting of the Royal Mamluks (the top tier in the Mamluk military hierarchy). Thereafter, his mamluk faction had their power restricted by Hasan.

== Bibliography ==
- Dobrowolski, Jaroslaw (2001). The Living Stones of Cairo. American University in Cairo Press. ISBN 9789774246326.
- Al-Harithy, Howyda N. (1996). "The Complex of Sultan Hasan in Cairo: Reading Between the Lines". In Gibb, H.A.R.; E. van Donzel; P.J. Bearman; J. van Lent (eds.). The Encyclopaedia of Islam. BRILL. ISBN 9789004106338.
- Mayer, L.A. (1933). Saracenic Heraldry: A Survey. Oxford: Oxford University Press. (pp. 11, 202− 205, his buildings 173, 202 f, 206)
- Muhammad, Abd al-Wahhab Bakr; Crecelius, Daniel (1991). Al-Damurdashi's Chronicle of Egypt, 1688-1755. Brill. ISBN 9789004094086.
