= Auri, Latvia =

Village in Dobele Municipality, Latvia

Coordinates: 56°34′N 23°18′E

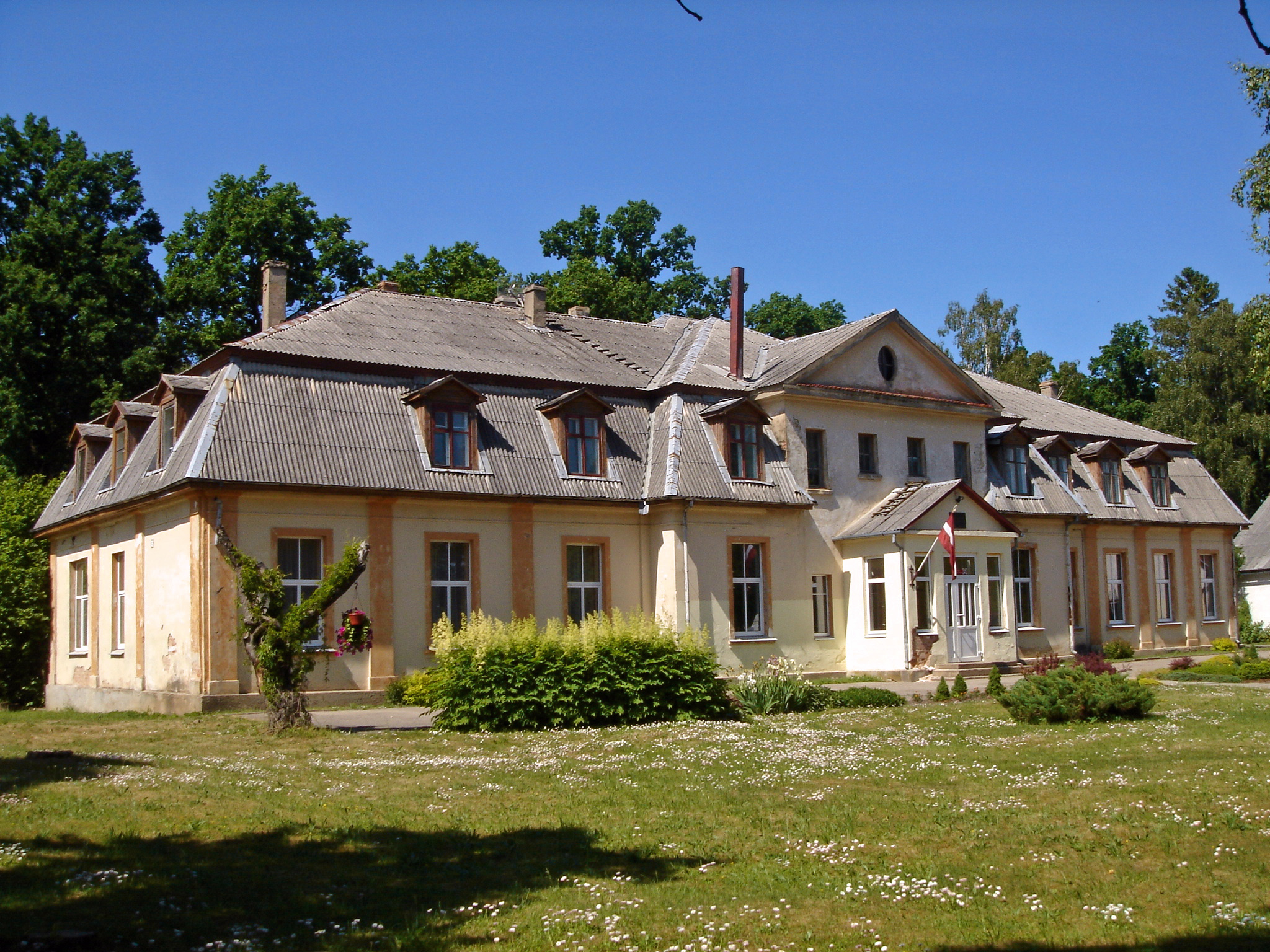
Auri school

Auri is a village and the administrative center of Auri Parish of Dobele Municipality in the Semigallia region of Latvia, and the Zemgale Planning Region.
