= Auri, Uttar Pradesh =

Coordinates: 30°42′N 77°45′E

Auri is a village in Uttar Pradesh, India.
