= Auris =

Auris may refer to:

- Auris, Isère, a town in France
- Auris, a snail genus, catalogued by George Washington Tryon
- Toyota Auris, an automobile
- Ear (Latin)
- Auris, the first ocean-going merchant ship powered by a gas turbine

== See also ==
- Auri (disambiguation)
