= Al-Mansur Muhammad, Sultan of Egypt =

Sultan of Egypt and Syria (1361–1363)

Salah ad-Din Muhammad
- Al-Malik al-Mansur
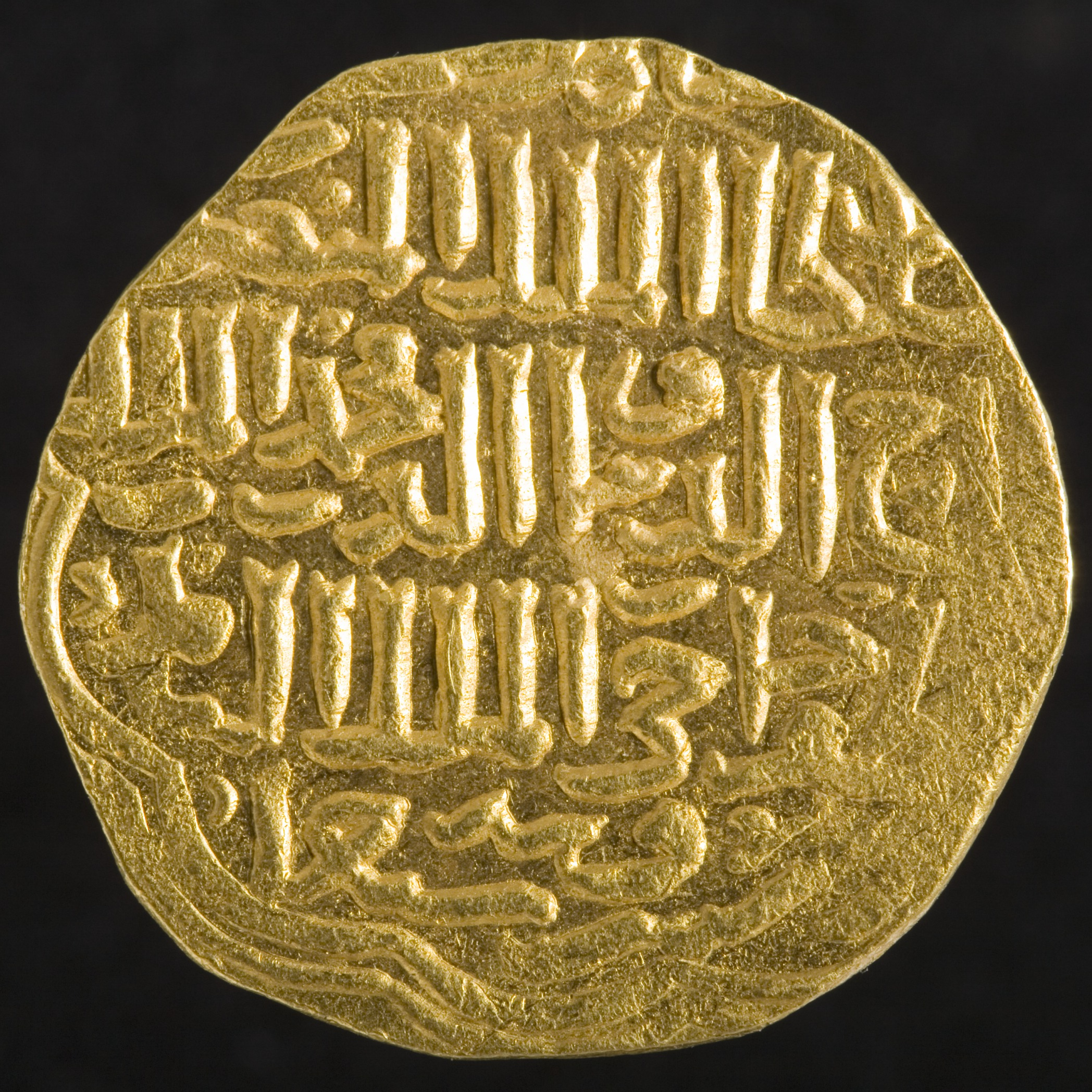
- Gold dinar, minted in Egypt, 1361-1363

Sultan of Egypt
- Reign: 17 March 1361 – 29 May 1363
- Predecessor: An-Nasir Hasan
- Successor: al-Ashraf Sha'ban
- Born: 1347/48
- Died: 1398 (age 50–51)
- Burial: Rawda Island
Names
- Al-Malik al-Mansur Salah ad-Din Muhammad ibn Hajji ibn Muhammad ibn Qalawun
- House: Qalawuni
- Dynasty: Bahri
- Father: Al-Muzaffar Hajji
- Religion: Islam

Al-Mansur Salah ad-Din Muhammad ibn Hajji ibn Muhammad ibn Qalawun (1347/48–1398), better known as al-Mansur Muhammad, was the Mamluk sultan in 1361–1363. He ruled in name only, with power held by the Mamluk magnates, particularly Yalbugha al-Umari, al-Mansur Muhammad's regent. The latter had al-Manur Muhammad's predecessor and uncle an-Nasir Hasan killed and al-Mansur Muhammad installed to replace him.

== Biography ==
Al-Mansur Muhammad was the son of Sultan al-Muzaffar Hajji (r. 1346–1347). Following the murder of his uncle, Sultan an-Nasir Hasan (r. 1354–1361), by Emir Yalbugha al-Umari in 1361, the latter and the other senior emirs or magnates selected al-Mansur Muhammad, then an adolescent, as an-Nasir Hasan's successor. His kingmakers consisted of eight emirs, chief among whom were emirs Yalbugha and Taybugha al-Tawil. Their decision to appoint al-Mansur Muhammad, a grandson Sultan an-Nasir Muhammad (r. 1310–1341), ended the tradition of installing sons of an-Nasir Muhammad as sultans. They chose al-Mansur Muhammad instead of an-Nasir Muhammad's last surviving son, al-Amjad Husayn, because they believed al-Mansur Muhammad would be easier to control. In the new order, Yalbugha was the most powerful of the senior emirs, although he ruled mostly in concert with Taybugha.

In early 1363, Yalbugha and Taybugha had al-Mansur Muhammad deposed based on allegations of the sultan's illicit behavior. They chose his cousin, al-Ashraf Sha'ban, the ten-year-old son of al-Amjad Husayn, as al-Mansur Muhammad's successor, in the belief that he would be easier to dominate. Al-Mansur Muhammad died in 1398 and was buried in the mausoleum of his paternal grandmother (wife of al-Muzaffar Hajji) in Rawda Island. He had ten children.

== Bibliography ==
- Steenbergen, Jo Van (September 2011). "The Amir Yalbughā al-Khāṣṣakī, the Qalāwūnid Sultanate, and the Cultural Matrix of Mamlūk Society: A Reassessment of Mamlūk Politics in the 1360s". Journal of the American Oriental Society. 131 (3). American Oriental Society: 423–443. JSTOR 41380710.

Regnal titles
Preceded by An-Nasir Hasan	Mamluk Sultan; March 1361 – May 1363	Succeeded by Al-Ashraf Sha'ban
