= Ibn Iyas =

Mamluk historian (1448–1522/4)

Muḥammad ibn Iyas al-Ḥanafī
- محمد بن أحمد بن إياس
- Born: June 1448 c or 6 Rabi‘ I 852 AH (8 June 1447)†; Cairo, Mamluk Sultanate (now Egypt)
- Died: 1522/24 (d. after November 1522)†; Cairo, Ottoman Egypt (now Egypt)
- Occupations: Historian, chronicler

Academic work
- Era: Late Mamluk and Early Ottoman period
- Language: Arabic
- Notable works: Badā’iʿ al-Zuhūr fī Waqā’iʿ al-Duhūr

Muhammad ibn Iyas (June 1448 – 1522/4) is one of the most important historians in modern Egyptian history. He was an eyewitness to the Ottoman invasion of Egypt. He was born in Cairo and took his first education there.

His quotes have been used in many references such as his statement on Mamluk Sultan Al-Nasir Muhammad: "His name was mentioned everywhere like no other king's name. All the kings wrote to him, sent gifts to him and feared him. The whole of Egypt was in his grasp."

== Work ==
Ibn Iyas was the author of a five-volume history of Egypt, totalling over 3,000 pages, entitled "Badāʼi al-zuhūr fī waqāʼi al-zuhūr".

- ibn Iyas, 1921, An account of the Ottoman conquest of Egypt in the year A.H. 922 (A.D. 1516)
