= As-Salih Salih =

Salih
- Al-Malik as-Salih
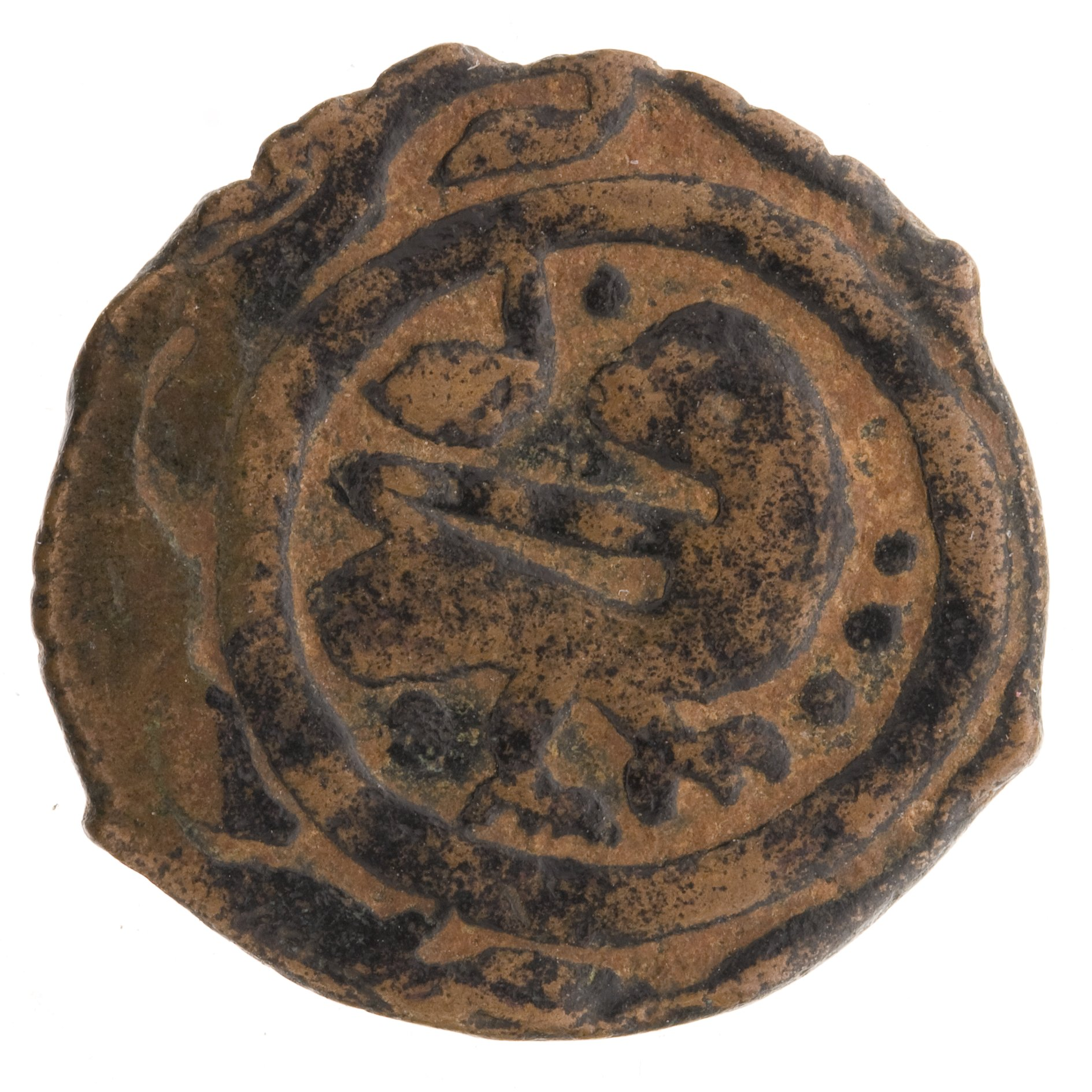
- Copper alloy fals of Mamluk sultan as-Salih Salih minted in Aleppo in 1354

Sultan of Egypt
- Reign: December 1351 – October 1354
- Predecessor: An-Nasir Hasan
- Successor: An-Nasir Hasan
- Born: 28 September 1337
- Died: December 1360 (aged 23)
- Burial: Cairo
- Issue: Muhammad
Names
- Al-Malik an-Salih Salah ad-Din Salih ibn Muhammad ibn Qalawun
- House: Qalawuni
- Dynasty: Bahri
- Father: An-Nasir Muhammad
- Mother: Qutlumalik bint Tankiz
- Religion: Islam

As-Salih Salah ad-Din Salih ibn Muhammad ibn Qalawun (28 September 1337–1360/61, better known as as-Salih Salih, was the Mamluk sultan in 1351–1354. He was the eighth son of Sultan an-Nasir Muhammad to accede to the sultanate. He was largely a figurehead, with real power held by the senior Mamluk emirs, most prominently Emir Taz an-Nasiri.

== Biography ==
Salih was born on 28 September 1337. He was the son of Sultan an-Nasir Muhammad (r. 1310–1341) and one of his wives, Qutlumalik, the daughter of Emir Tankiz al-Husami of Damascus (r. 1312–1340). As sultan, Salih often displayed public affection and respect for his mother. He took his mother and his wives on a trip to Siryaqus (a resort village north of Cairo), along with several emirs and other officials. There, he held a royal ceremony in honor of his mother in which he laid out her table and served her food that he personally prepared. He declared her honorary sultan, accorded her regalia and assigned her servants and slave girls to play the role of her emirs.

In August 1351, Salih was appointed as sultan in place of his half-brother an-Nasir Hasan. His installment in the sultanate was a result of a decision by the senior Mamluk emirs, namely Taz and Baybugha in response to an-Nasir Hasan's move to assert real control over the state. At the onset of Salih's reign, emirs Shaykhu and Manjak (com) (Baybugha's brother) were released. In effect, Emir Taz was the ruler of the sultanate and Salih was a figurehead sultan. However, Salih did assert his authority when Emir Baybugha launched a rebellion in Syria in 1352. Salih led his army to Damascus and confronted the rebels. Baybugha and the nuwwab (governors, sing. na'ib) of Safad, Hama and Tripoli were ultimately imprisoned, and Byabugha died while incarcerated in Aleppo later that year.

Emir Shaykhu fell out with Salih and at the same time conspired with Emir Sirghitmish to oust Emir Taz from power. In October 1354, the dissident emirs toppled Salih and restored an-Nasir Hasan to power, while sending Taz to Aleppo to serve as that province's na'ib (effectively exiling him). Salih died in December 1360 at the age of 24. He was buried in the mausoleum of his paternal grandmother, Umm Salih (wife of Qalawun) in Cairo. He was survived by his son, Muhammad.

== Bibliography ==
- Bauden, Frédéric (2009). "The Sons of al-Nāṣir Muḥammad and the Politics of Puppets: Where Did It All Start?" (PDF). Mamluk Studies Review. 13 (1). Middle East Documentation Center, The University of Chicago.
- Al-Harithy, Howyda N. (1996). "The Complex of Sultan Hasan in Cairo: Reading Between the Lines". In Gibb, H.A.R.; E. van Donzel; P.J. Bearman; J. van Lent (eds.). The Encyclopaedia of Islam. BRILL. ISBN 9789004106338.
- Levanoni, Amalia (1995). A Turning Point in Mamluk History: The Third Reign of Al-Nāṣir Muḥammad Ibn Qalāwūn (1310-1341). Brill. ISBN 9789004101821.

Regnal titles
Preceded by An-Nasir Hasan	Mamluk Sultan; December 1351 – October 1354	Succeeded by An-Nasir Hasan
