= Al-Muzaffar Hajji =

Bahri Mamluk sultan of Egypt

Hajji
- Al-Malik al-Muzaffar
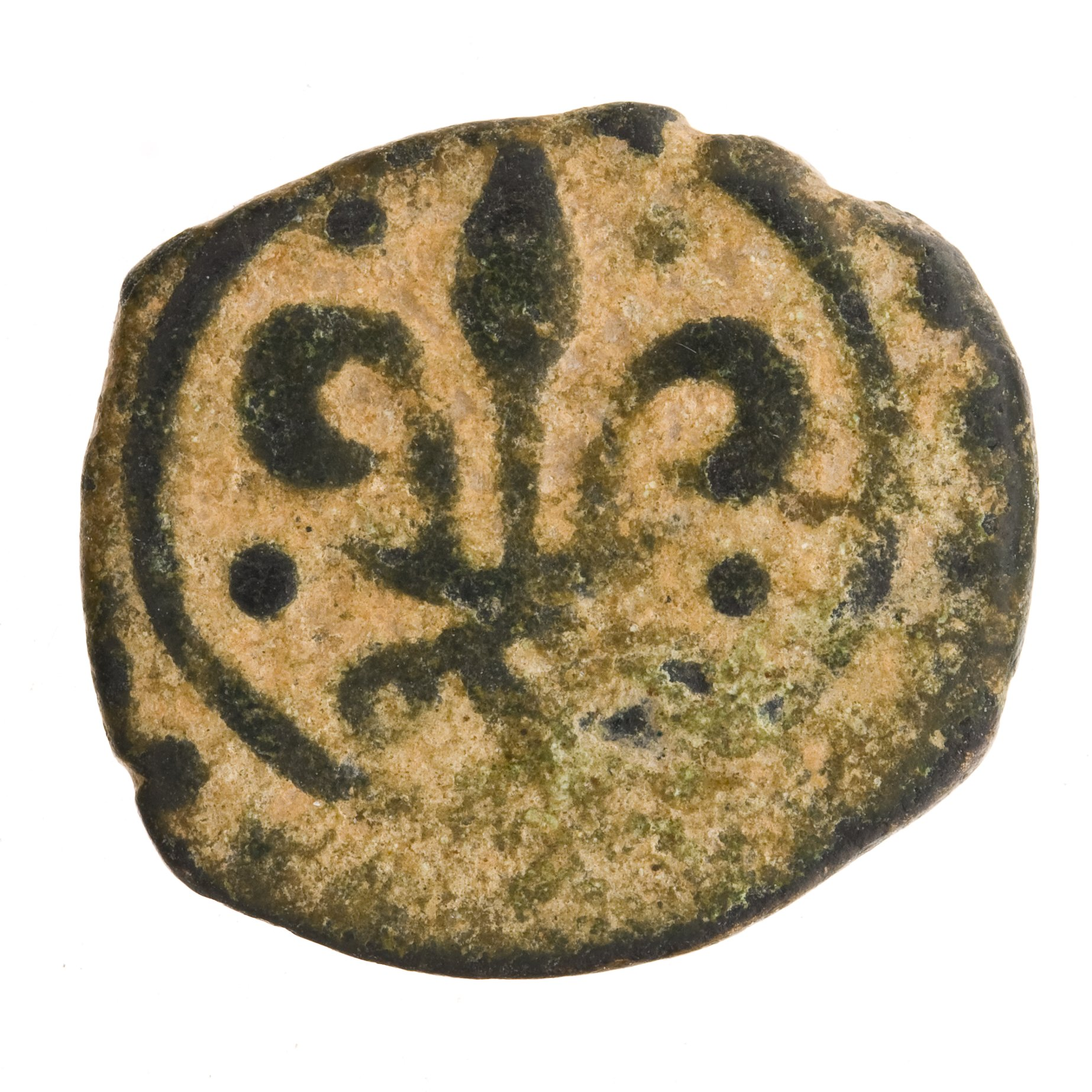
- Copper fals of Muzaffar Hajji

Sultan of Egypt
- Reign: September 1346 – December 1347
- Predecessor: Al-Kamil Sha'ban
- Successor: An-Nasir Hasan
- Born: 1331; Cairo, Mamluk Sultanate
- Died: December 1347 (age 16); Outskirts of Cairo, Mamluk Sultanate
- Issue: Muhammad; Ahmad
Names
- Al-Malik al-Muzaffar Sayf ad-Din Hajji ibn Muhammad ibn Qalawun
- House: Qalawuni
- Dynasty: Bahri
- Father: An-Nasir Muhammad
- Religion: Islam

Al-Muzaffar Sayf ad-Din Hajji ibn Muhammad ibn Qalawun, better known as al-Muzaffar Hajji, (1331–December 1347) was the Bahri Mamluk sultan of Egypt. He was also the sixth son of an-Nasir Muhammad (d. 1341) to hold office, ruling from September 1346 and December 1347. He was known for his love of sports and pigeon racing, acts which led to frustration among the senior Mamluk emirs who believed he neglected the duties of office and spent extravagant sums on gambling. His reign ended when he was killed in a confrontation with Mamluk conspirators outside of Cairo.

== Biography ==
=== Early life and family ===
Al-Muzaffar Hajji was born "al-Malik al-Muzaffar Hajji" in 1331. The appellation "al-Malik", which means "king" in Arabic, was rare among the sons of Mamluk sultans at birth and was typically given at the accession to the sultanate. Al-Muzaffar Hajji was a son of the long-reigning Sultan an-Nasir Muhammad and one of his concubines, whose name is not provided by the Mamluk-era sources. He married a daughter of Emir Tankiz al-Husami on 15 January 1347 and had one son with her, Muhammad (d. 1398), who became sultan in 1361–1363. Al-Muzaffar Hajji had a second son named Ahmad (d. 1381) with another woman.

=== Reign ===
Al-Muzaffar Hajji was the sixth of the an-Nasir Muhammad's sons to serve as sultan following an-Nasir Muhammad's death in 1341. Al-Muzaffar Hajji's accession to the sultanate came after the death of his brother and predecessor al-Kamil Sha'ban in September 1346. Like with his other brothers, despite the accession pacts made with the leading Mamluk emirs, al-Muzaffar Hajji's rule was in effect a power center rivaling the Mamluk establishment, which consisted of the powerful emirs and mamluks of an-Nasir Muhammad. Al-Muzaffar Hajji married the daughter of the well-known and long-reigning Mamluk viceroy of Syria, Tankiz (d. 1340) in 1346.

Al-Muzaffar Hajji was known for his affection of the commoners and engaging in sports, such as wrestling wearing only professional leather trousers, stick fighting, polo and pigeon racing. In 1347, the leading Mamluk emirs of the citadel, frustrated at al-Muzaffar Hajji's extravagance and apparent neglect of duties, expelled an African slave girl named Ittifaq that al-Muzaffar Hajji had preoccupied his time with and secretly married, from the citadel. However, al-Muzaffar Hajji's interest in pigeons became another source of frustration with the senior emirs. They were particularly bothered by his frequent distribution of high sums in gold and pearls to pigeon racers and his high-stakes bets. After his senior emirs raised the issue with him, al-Muzaffar Hajji became enraged and killed all of his pigeons one-by-one as a warning to his emirs that they could meet the same fate.

Al-Muzaffar Hajji developed close ties with Emir Ghurlu, with whom al-Muzaffar Hajji entrusted governmental affairs. Ghurlu attempted to curb the power of the emirs Arutay (vice-regent), Uljaybugha and Taniraq, all of whom were angered by Ghurlu's powers and conspired against him. They succeeded in turning al-Muzaffar Hajji against Ghurlu by using the court jester, a paralyzed and honored individual named Shaykh Ali al-Kasih, through his jokes to make al-Muzaffar Hajji suspicious of Ghurlu's intentions. It was also through al-Kasih that Taniraq and Uljaybugha learned that al-Muzaffar Hajji was set on deposing them. The emirs thus conspired to have al-Muzaffar Hajji eliminated. In December 1347, a group of Circassian mamluks angry at al-Muzaffar Hajji's killing of a senior Circassian emir in his retinue revolted against his rule. Al-Muzaffar Hajji and his troops sought to eliminate them, but once al-Muzaffar Hajji reached the outskirts of Cairo, his troops abandoned him. Al-Muzaffar Hajji was subsequently captured and killed thirteen months into his reign, on 16 December. His death was commented on by his contemporary as-Safadi, who wrote:

You intelligent people, think about the strong al-Malik al-Muzaffar! How much wrong and injustice did he commit, till the pigeon play became the seriousness of death!

== Bibliography ==
- Behrens-Abouseif, Doris (2012). The Arts of the Mamluks in Egypt and Syria: Evolution and Impact. Bonn University Press. ISBN 9783899719154.
- Holt, Peter Malcolm (1986). The Age of the Crusades: The Near East from the Eleventh Century to 151. Addison Wesley Longman Limited. ISBN 9781317871521.
- Holt, Peter Malcolm (2005). "The Position and Power of the Mamluk Sultan". In Hawting, G.R. (ed.). Muslims, Mongols and Crusaders: An Anthology of Articles Published in the Bulletin of the School of Oriental and African Studies. Routledge. ISBN 9780415450966.
- Irwin, Robert (1994). The Arabian Nights: A Companion. Tauris Parke Paperbacks. ISBN 9781860649837.
- Levanoni, Amalia (1995). A Turning Point in Mamluk History: The Third Reign of Al-Nāṣir Muḥammad Ibn Qalāwūn (1310-1341). Brill. ISBN 9789004101821.
- Rosenthal, Franz (1975). Gambling in Islam. Brill. ISBN 9004043144.

Regnal titles
Preceded by Al-Kamil Sha'ban	Mamluk Sultan; September 1346–December 1347	Succeeded by An-Nasir Hasan
