= Shubra El Kheima =

Shubra El Kheima شبرا الخيمة
- City
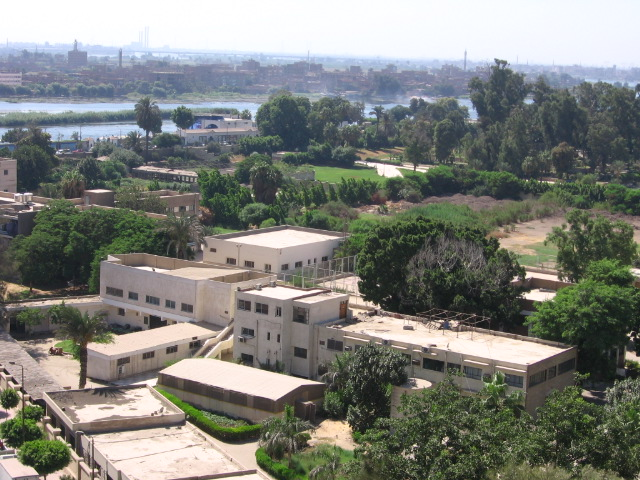
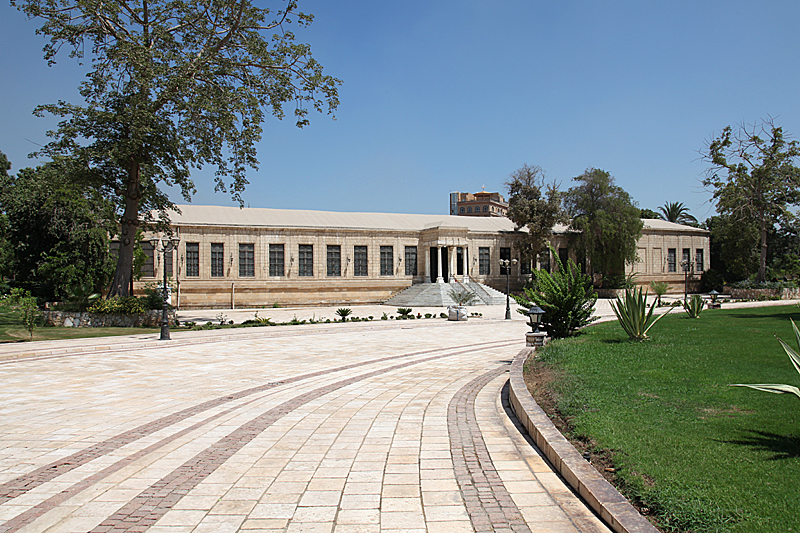
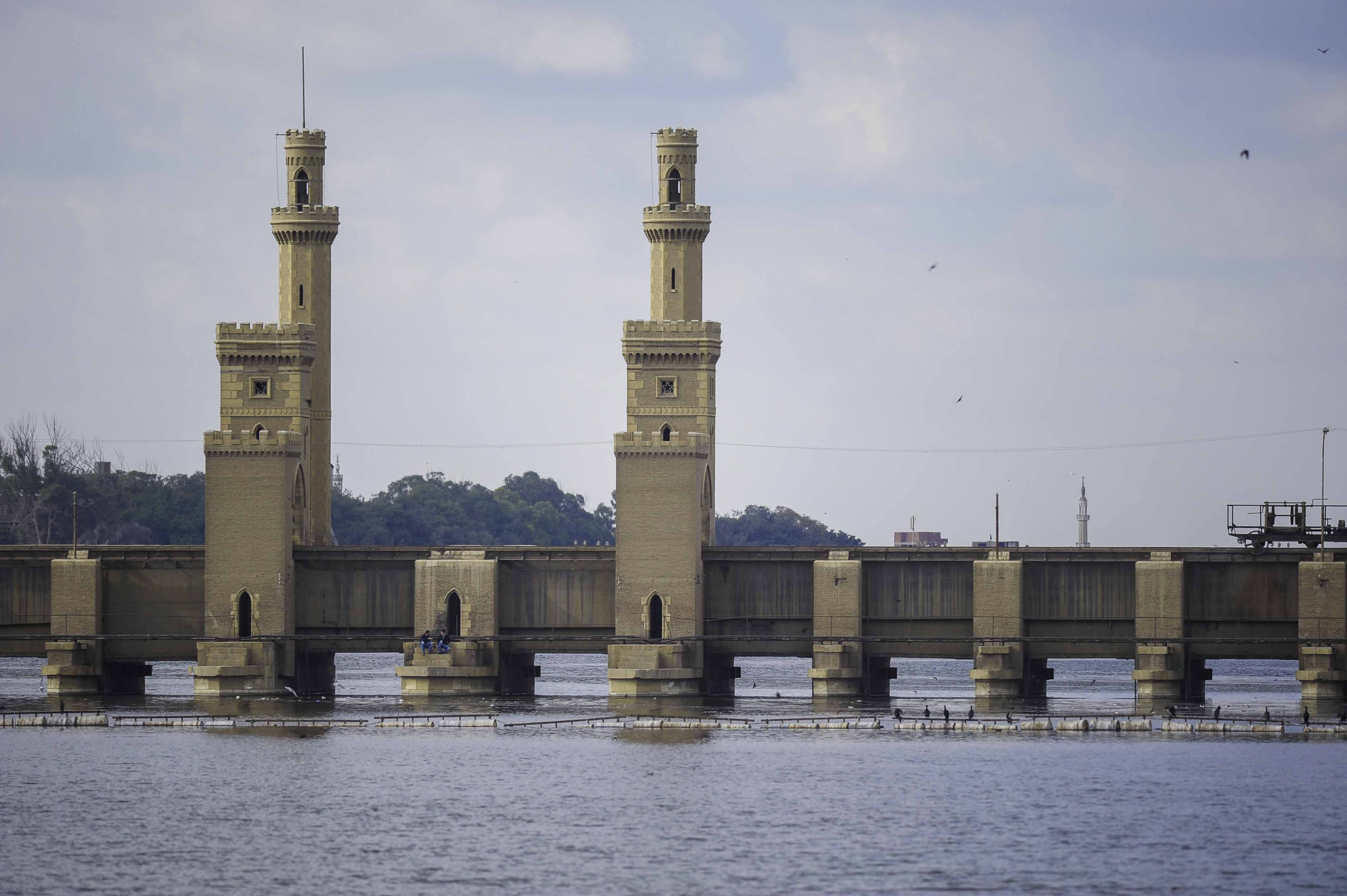
- View of the gardens on the Nile banks Shubrah Palace El Qanater El Khayreya

- Location in Egypt
- Coordinates: 30°07′43″N 31°14′32″E
- Country: Egypt
- Governorate: Qalyubia
- Established: 1832

Area
  - Total: 30.0 km^{2} (11.6 sq mi)
- Elevation: 26 m (85 ft)

Population (2021)
  - Total: 1,240,289
  - Density: 41,300/km^{2} (107,000/sq mi)
- Time zone: UTC+2 (EET)
  - Summer (DST): UTC+3 (EEST)

Shubra El Kheima, (Egyptian Arabic: شبرا الخيمة, lit. 'hamlet of the tent', IPA: [ˈʃobɾɑ lˈxeːmæ]) is the fourth-largest city in Egypt after Cairo, Giza and Alexandria. It is located in the Qalyubia Governorate along the northern edge of the Cairo Governorate. It forms part of the Greater Cairo metropolitan area.

== History and demographics ==
Shubra El Kheima was a village on the Nile where Mohamed Ali built a palace in its vicinity in 1808 as a rural retreat.

During the 20th century, the area became primarily inhabited by workers and their families, as it became a major industrial hub.

Today, along with the cities of Cairo and Giza, Shubra al-Kheima makes up the contiguous metropolitan area of Greater Cairo. In the 2017 census it was home to 1,161,514 people, divided between two districts comprising five shiakhas (smallest non-administrative census blocks):

- District 1: (hayy awwal): 481,936 people.

Shiakha	Code 2017	Population
Shubrâ al-Khayma	141001	20,175
Bîjâm	141002	435,076
Damanhûr Shubrâ	141003	26,685

- District 2 (hayy thani): 679,578 people.

Shiakha	Code 2017	Population
Bahtîm	141101	545,540
Musṭurud	141102	134,038

== Transportation ==
Shubra El Kheima station serves the northern terminus of Line 2 of the Cairo Metro. Near the metro station, there is also a station within the Egyptian National Railways system.

Shubra El Kheima is also served by taxis, CTA-owned and private buses, microbuses, and in the case of poorer districts, tuk tuks.

== Landmarks ==
=== Mohamed Ali Pavilion ===
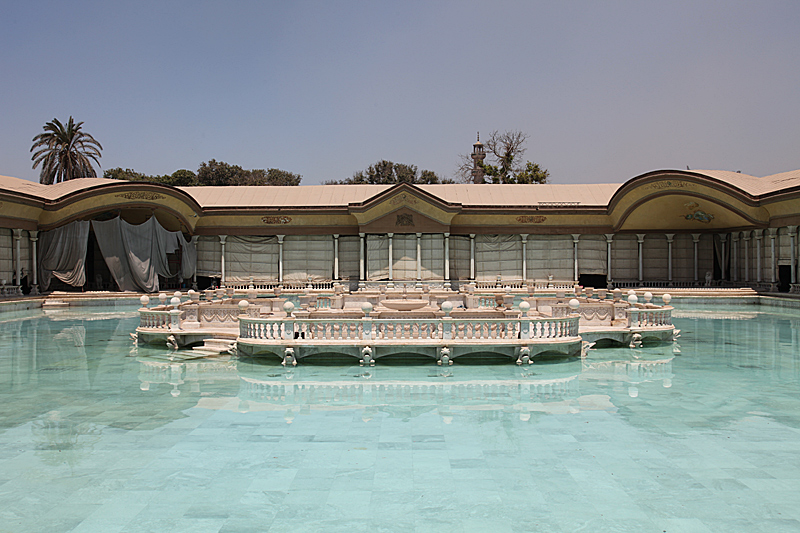
Shubrah Palace Facade

Shubra El Kheima hosts the Fountain Pavilion of Mohamed Ali Pasha, built in 1821 as part of a palace complex that no longer exists. He chose an isolated palace or an official residence away from the Citadel in the district called Shubra, the construction of the palace began in 1808 and it was completed in 1821. The Mohamed Ali Palace or Shubra Palace is distinguished by its style of decoration that mixes between the Islamic style of decoration and the European one.

== Gallery ==
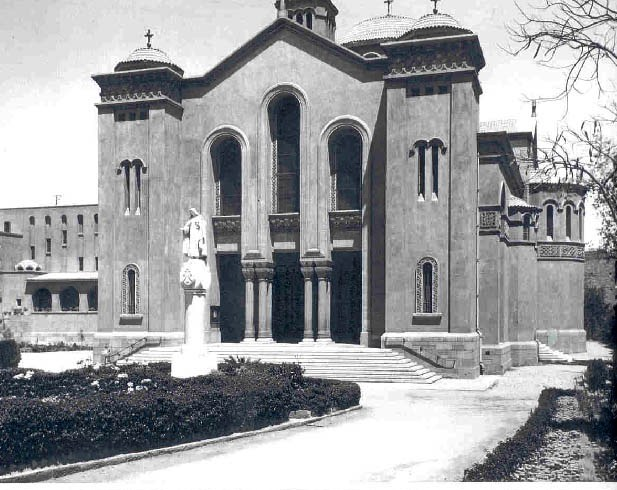
Saint Theresa Church

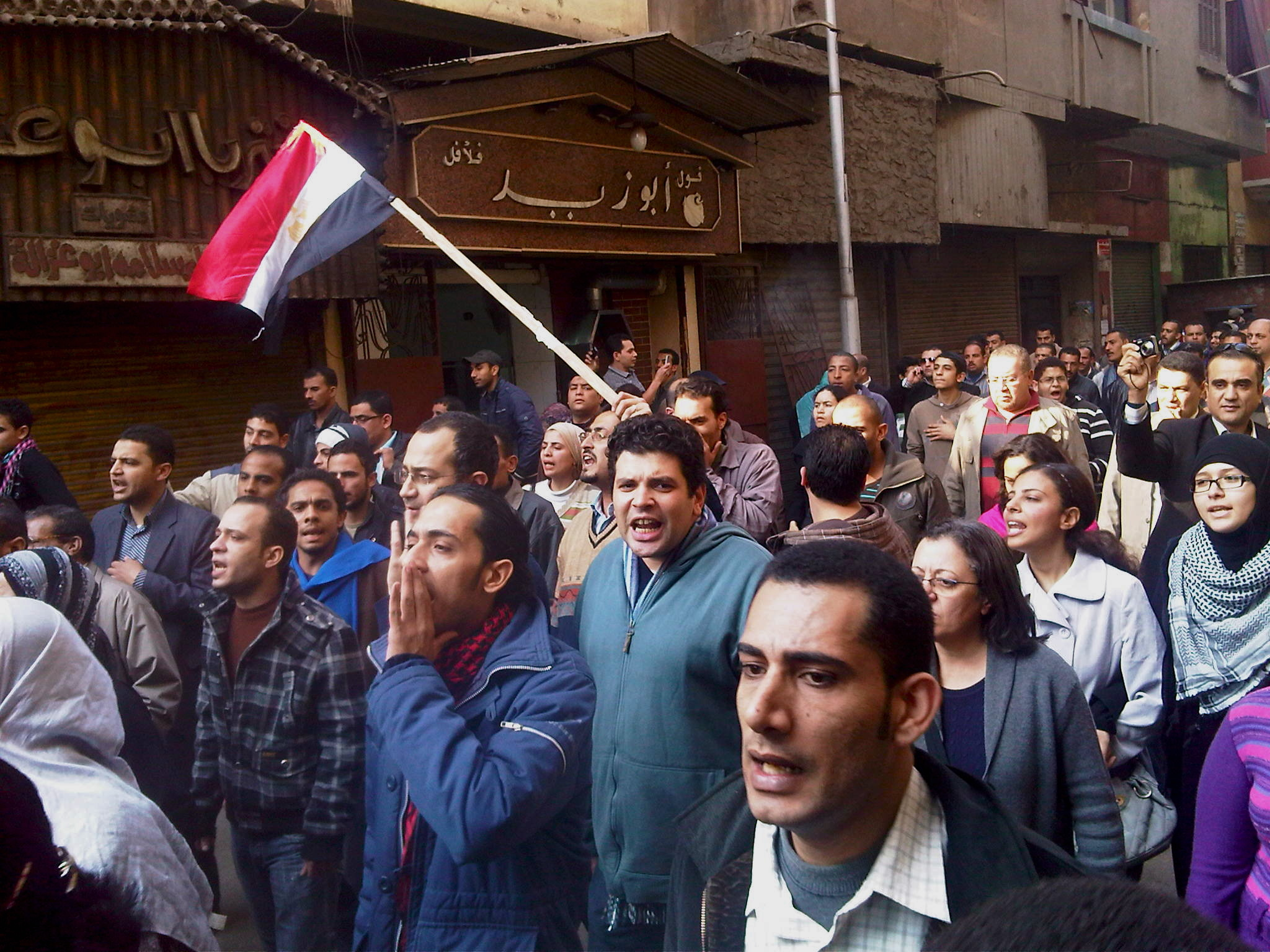
Protesters during 2011 Egyptian Revolution
