= Mohamed Ali Palace =

Historic royal palace in Shubra el Kheima, Egypt

Coordinates: 30.1158°N 31.2457°E

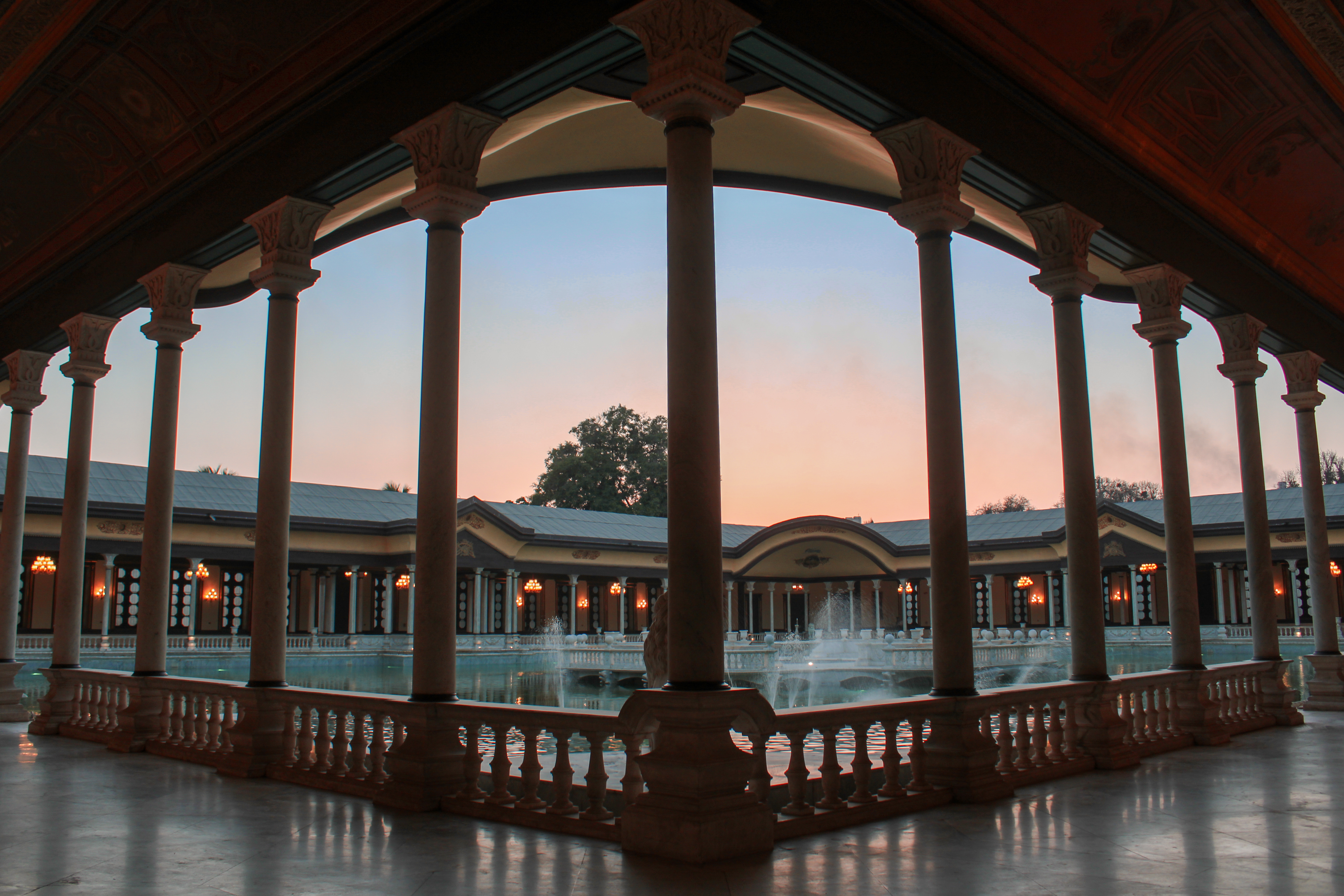
The reflecting pool at the Mohamed Ali Palace

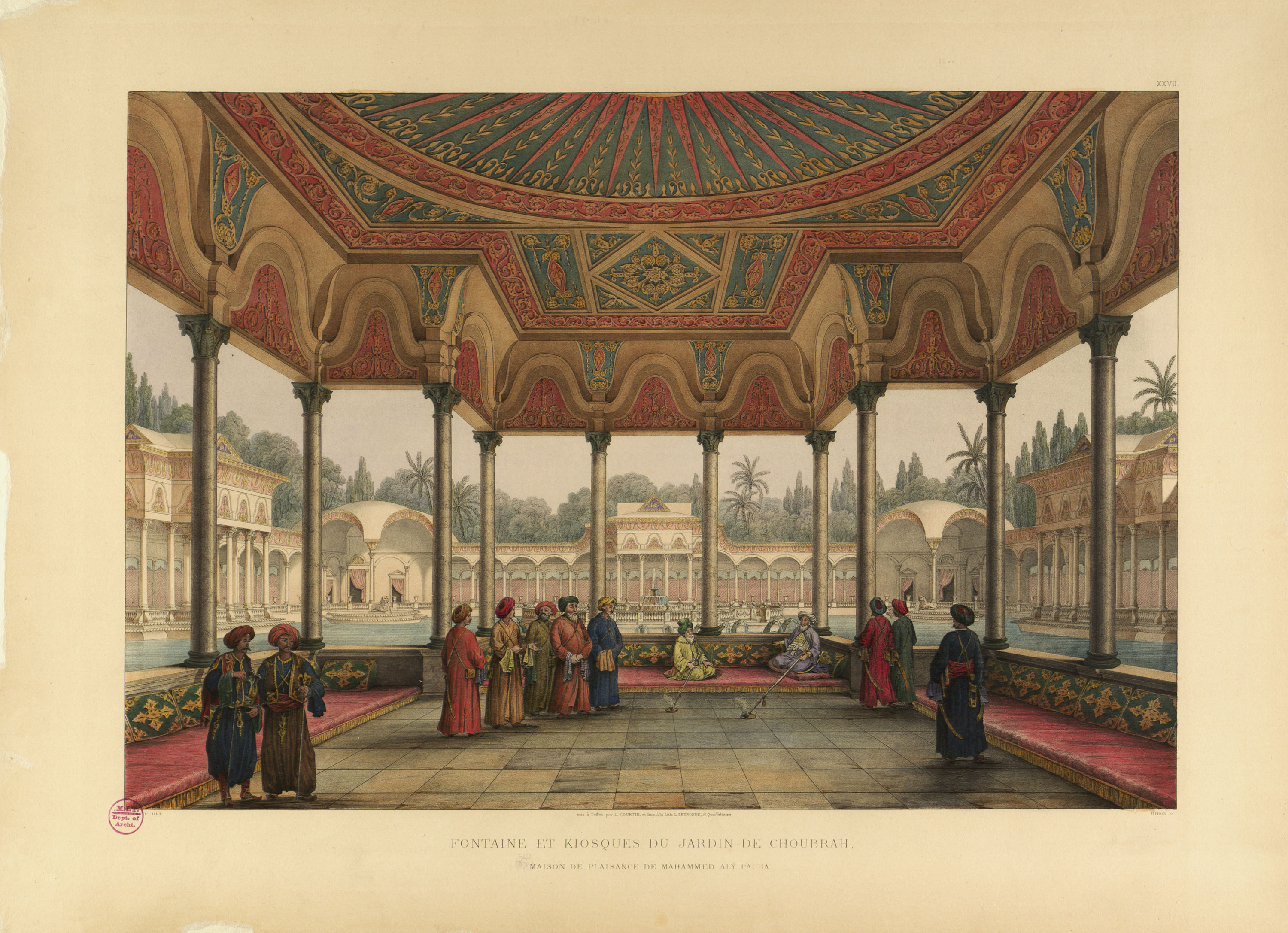
Mohamed Ali receiving guests at the palace by Pascal Coste

The Mohamed Ali Palace (Arabic: قصر محمد علي بشبرا الخيمة) (also known as the Shubra Palace or Choubran Palace) is a 19th-century royal complex built by the Egyptian viceroy Mohammad Ali in the then-suburb of Shubra (now Shubra El Kheima) on the eastern bank of the Nile, north of Cairo, Egypt. Construction began around 1808 and was completed in 1821, encompassing a sprawling estate of approximately 150 acres that included gardens, pavilions, and auxiliary structures. The palace combines Arabic, Ottoman, and European architectural styles and became popularly known as the Egyptian Versailles.

Today, only part of the complex survives: the Fountain Pavilion (a nymphaeum used for receptions and festivals) and the Gabalaya Kiosk (used as a residence for women). Restoration work began in 2000, and both structures are now open to the public.

== History ==
=== Mohamed Ali ===
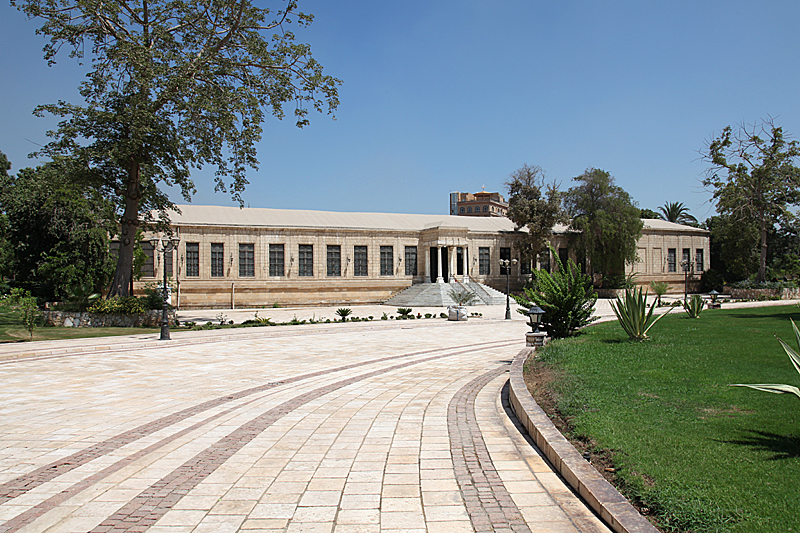
The exterior of the Fountain Pavillion (2009)

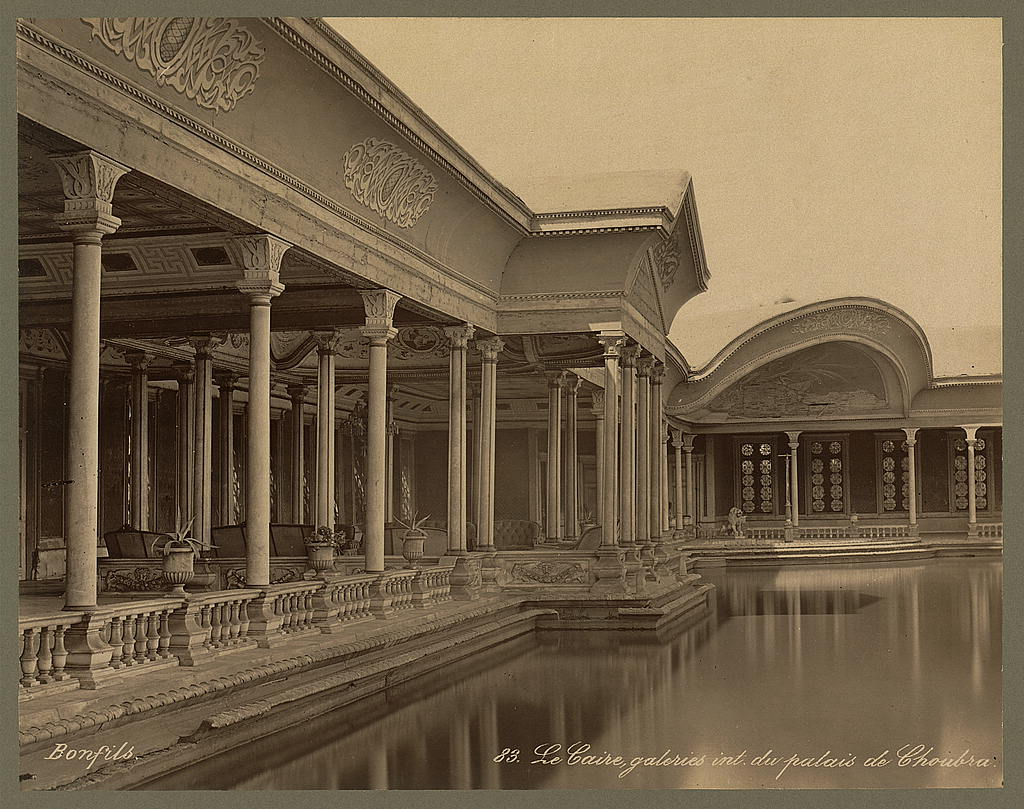
The galleries of the Fountain Pavillion

Mohamed Ali commissioned a summer palace in Shubra, away from the Citadel, where he could relax and receive foreign dignitaries. Visitors included the future king Maximilian of Bavaria in 1838, while the last notable royal guest was Princess Mary of the United Kingdom, who was entertained by Princess Bahiga Toussoun in the late 1920s.

The first structure erected was the main building, the Haramlik, designed under the supervision of engineer Zul Fuqar Katukda. Additional buildings were created for servants and guards, and a private Nile anchorage was built. The estate’s extensive gardens, landscaped by Greek designers, contributed to its reputation as the Egyptian Versailles. In addition, the road between the Cairo Citadel and the palace in Shubra was improved and extended.

The Fountain Pavilion was among the first buildings in Egypt to be illuminated by gas lighting, introduced by the English engineer M. Galaway in 1820 at Muhammad Ali’s request.

=== After Mohamed Ali ===
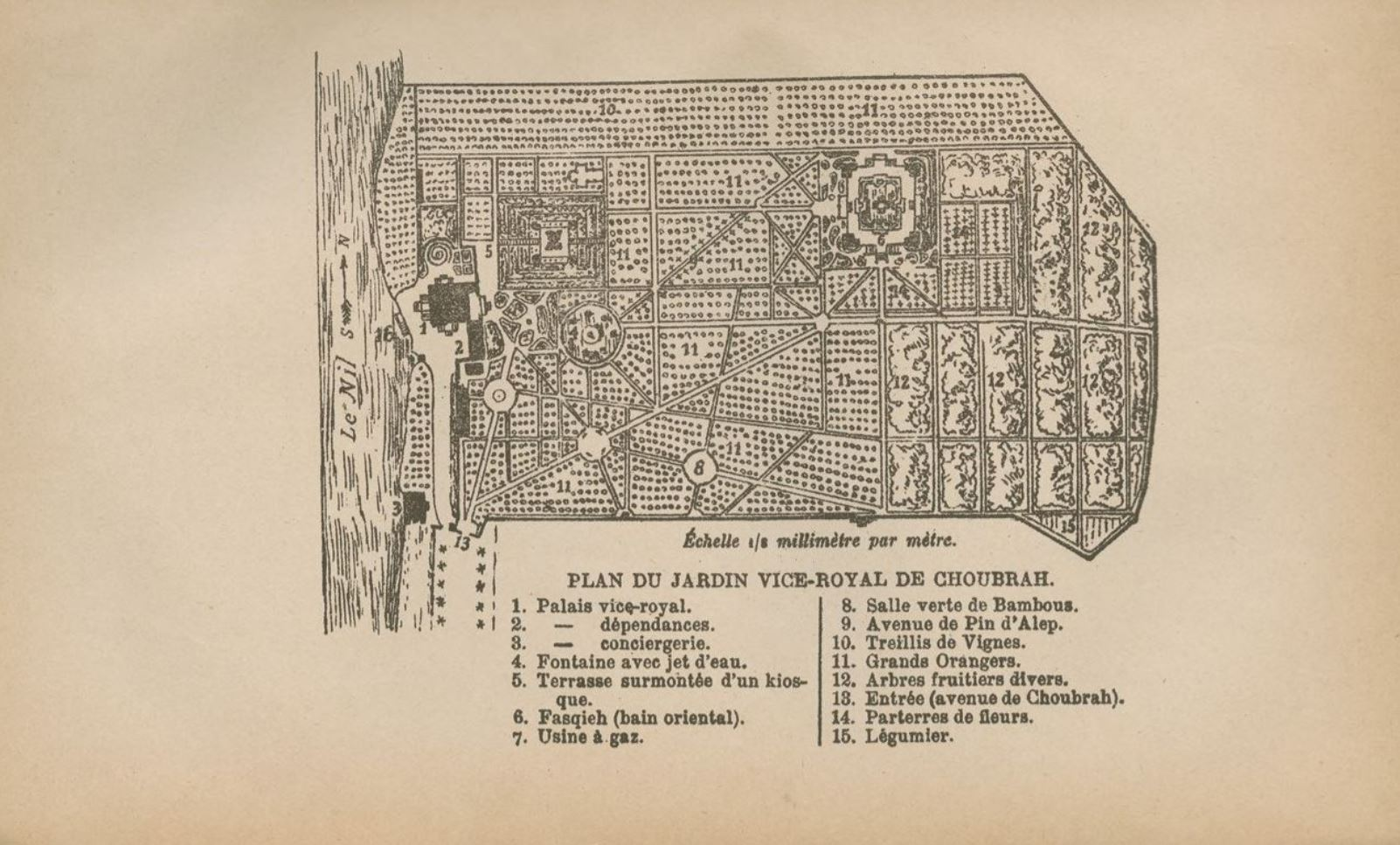
Plan of the palace complex by Gustave Delchevalerie - The Fountain Pavillion lies right above (number 6)

After Mohamed Ali’s death, the palace was inherited by his youngest son, Prince Halim Pasha (1821–1894), who initiated restorations in the 1860s. As a contender to the throne, Halim was later forced into exile, escaping the palace grounds at night via a secret opening in the perimeter wall. He eventually settled in Istanbul, where he died in 1894.

The palace later passed to Khedive Isma’il, who in the 1870s employed French landscaper Gustave Delchevalerie to reorganize the gardens. After Isma’il, his third son, Prince Hassan, inherited the complex, who put it up for sale. His brother, Khedive Tewfik, intervened, declaring the palace too beautiful to be sold, after which Hassan abandoned the plan.

During the First World War, fears arose that the British might requisition the palace for military use. Its owner at the time, Princess Aziza Hassan, granddaughter of Khedive Isma’il, responded by demolishing the Haramlik, the main residential palace.

In 1935, King Fuad I temporarily housed members of the royal family in the remaining palace buildings. That same year, part of the gardens was destroyed to make way for the Cairo–Alexandria road.

=== After the 1952 revolution ===
After the Egyptian revolution of 1952, the palace gardens were transferred to the Agricultural Faculty of Ain Shams University and repurposed as farmland for student training. In 1984, the site was classified as a protected monument and placed under the Supreme Council of Antiquities, with plans to convert it into a museum. Restoration began only in 2000 due to disputes with the university. The palace reopened in 2005, closed again in 2010 for further work, and was damaged in 2015 by a nearby bomb attack. It was reopened to the public in 2021.

== Architecture ==
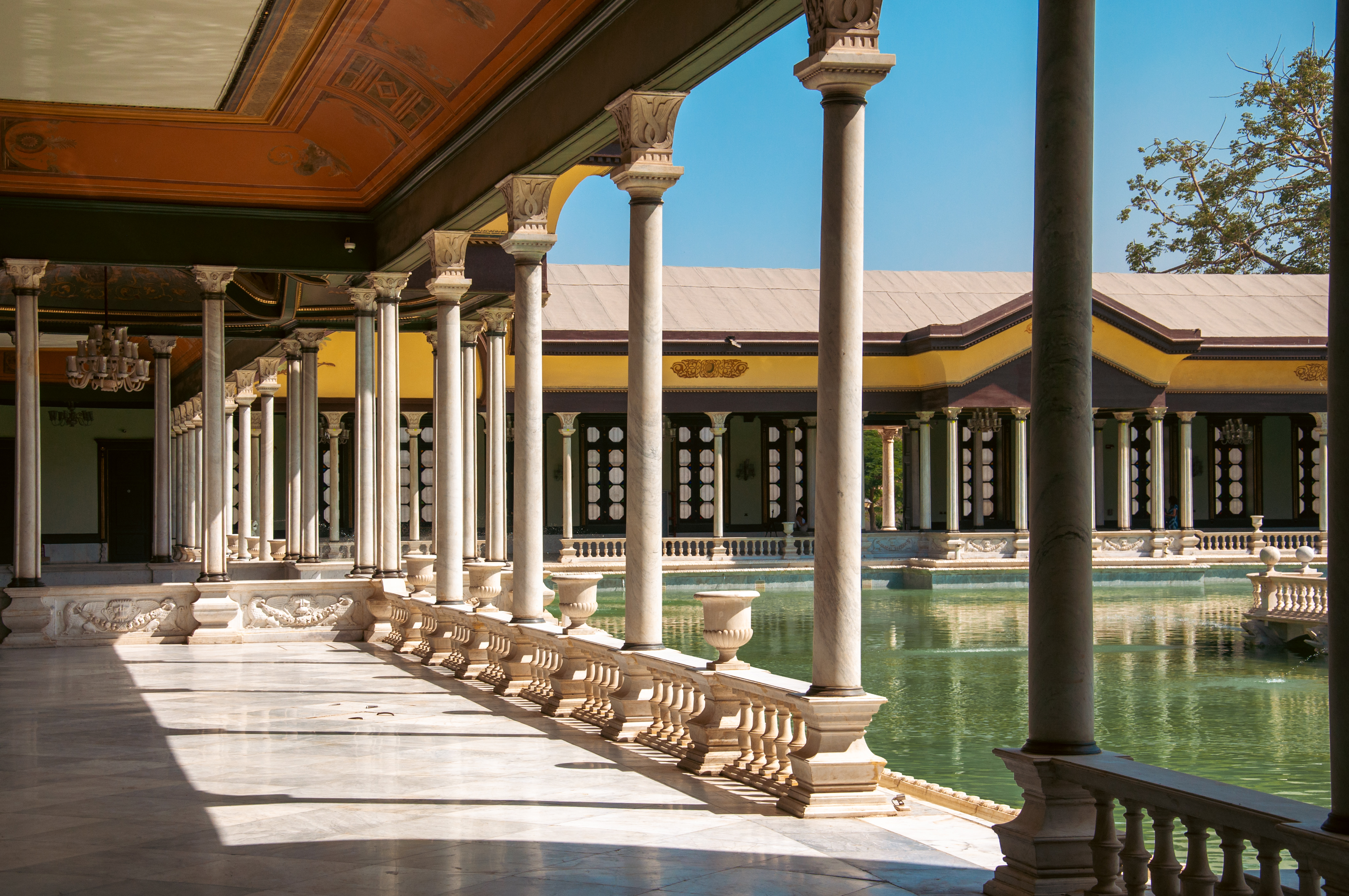
The galleries of the Fountain Pavillion (2023)

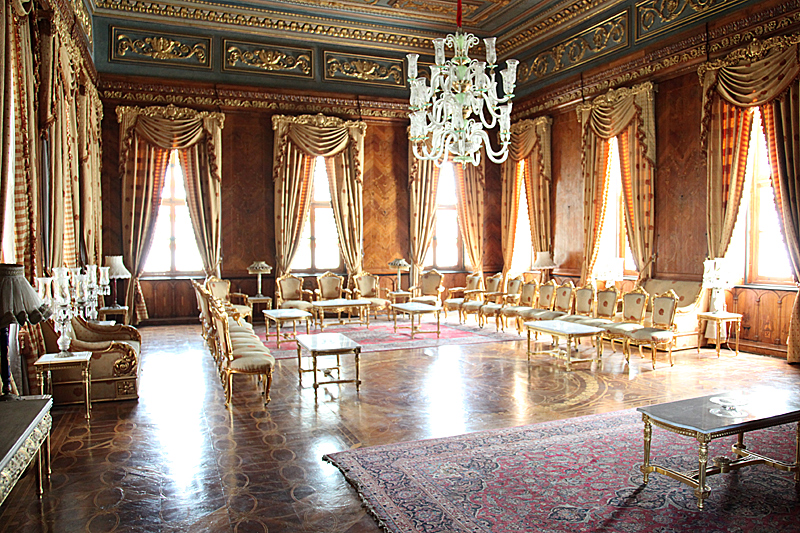
The drawing room (2009)

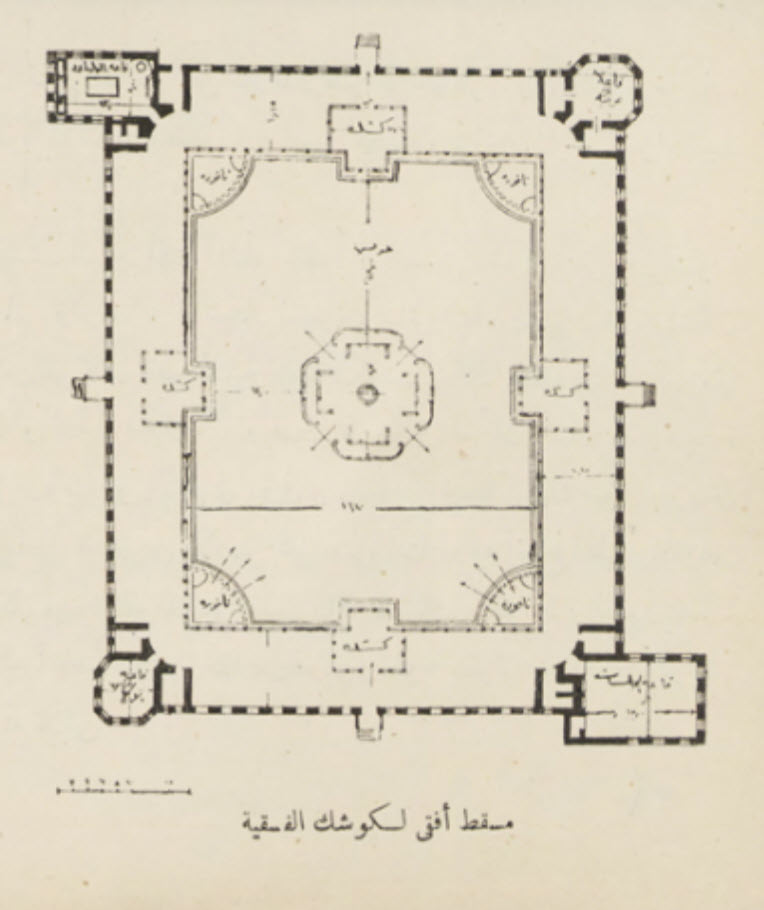
Floor plan of the Fountain Pavillion, with the fountain in the middle, galleries around and rooms/ suites in the corners

The palace followed the model of Ottoman garden palaces in Istanbul along the Bosphorus and the Sea of Marmara: an extensive walled park with several gates and scattered pavilions. The complex contained thirteen buildings used as guesthouses for family members and visiting dignitaries. Its design combined Arabic and European decorative elements.

The main building, fronting the Nile, was built in white marble in an early 19th-century orientalist style. It featured loggias, balconies with metalwork, and stucco arabesques. Its interiors were richly decorated and furnished, but when the Haramlik was demolished, salvaged materials were sold for considerable profit.

Today, only the Fountain Pavilion and the Gabalaya Kiosk survive.

=== Fountain Pavilion (Nymphaeum) ===
The Fountain Pavilion, constructed from 1820, was designed around a large marble-lined reflecting pool. At its centre, a fountain-islet with Carrara marble balustrades rests on twenty-four marble crocodiles that spout water from their jaws. The pool is surrounded by a gallery with 104 marble columns on bronze bases, interrupted by four terraces. Marble lions on semicircular platforms spout water into the pool.

The pavilion’s four corner suites were decorated in different styles. One contained a Louis XV style drawing room with a parquet floor of rosewood, another housed a billiard room, and the remaining suites were used as bedrooms.

Although French architect Pascal Coste prepared detailed blueprints for the pavilion, he was excluded from the execution, which was carried out by Turkish and Armenian architects. The design, especially the colonnades, was inspired by the Grand Trianon.

The pavilion was primarily used for receptions and festivals.

=== Gabalaya Kiosk ===
The Gabalaya Kiosk, located on a small hill, was intended as a residence for women. It was completed a few years after the Fountain Pavilion.

== Literature ==
- Abd Al-Wahab, Hassan (1941). "Mohamed Ali's Palace, Shubra". Majallat al-Imarah (in Arabic). 3: 21–27.
- Johnston, Shirley (2006). Egyptian Palaces and Villas Pashas, Khedives, and Kings. New York: Abrams. pp. 20–24. ISBN 0-8109-5538-5.
- Kurhan, Caroline (2015). Palais oublies d'Egypte (in French). Paris: Riveneuve Editions. pp. 37–45. ISBN 978-2-360133-41-3.
