= Ibrahim Bin Ali Al Wazeer =

Yemeni politician

- Born: 1935; Taiz, Yemen
- Died: 28 June 2014 (aged 78–79); London

Ibrahim bin Ali Al-Wazeer (born in 1932 in Taiz, died on 28 June 2014 in London), is a Yemeni politician and Islamic thinker who founded in the sixties the Union of Popular Forces, which took a middle position between the royalists and the republicans, and has several books on Islamic thought and the Yemeni issue.

== Education ==
He was born in 1932 in Taiz and grew up there, and moved at the age of fifteen to study at the Scientific School in Sana'a. He interrupted his studies in 1948 following the failure of the Constitutional Revolution and the execution of his father and uncle Abdullah al-Wazir, who were among its leaders. He was imprisoned in the Cairo Citadel in the city of Hajjah, where he studied with a number of imprisoned religious scholars. After his release, in 1954, he managed to escape from Yemen on a ship that took him and other Yemeni opponents to Port Sudan, and from there he went to Egypt and studied at its universities and obtained a higher diploma in literature and language, and also obtained a diploma in a social worker in UNESCO. During his stay in Egypt, he was acquainted with Islamic thinkers such as Sayyid Qutb, Malik bin Nabi, and Jamal Al-Banna, and was influenced by them later in his writings.

== Political work in Yemen ==
He returned to Yemen after the Republic of 1962 and was known as "the third force", which took a mobility in the war between the Republicans and supporters of the imam, and then later founded the "Federal Powers" party and took his leadership and founded the newspaper "Shura" He moved in early 1970s to Saudi Arabia, and later migrated to Washington and settled.

== Writing ==
He was invited to renewal in the Zaidi's doctrine and rapprochement between the doctrines, and issued in Jeddah in Saudi Arabia the most important written "on the outskirts of the fifteenth century Hijri," and "Imam Zaid Jihad is a durable right," and "Imam Shafei is a revolution and founder of doctrine."

== Bibliography ==
- In order not to go into darkness, (Original title: Likay la namdi fi alzalam) Dar Al-Andalus, Beirut, 1962 / Dar Al-Shorouk, Cairo, 1984.
- In the Hands of Tragedy, ( Original title : Bayn yaday almasat ) Dar Al-Andalus, Beirut, 1962.
- Zaid bin Ali: Jihad is a permanent right, ( Original title: Zayd bin ealiin jihad haqun dayim ) Dar Al-Irshad, Beirut, 1970 / Dar Al-Manahil, 1999.
- Bitter Harvest - Let the nation see what it will sow for tomorrow, ( Original title: Alhisad almuru - anzur alamat madha tazrae lighad ) Iqra Publishing House, Lebanon, 197.
- On the outskirts of the fifteenth Hijri century, ( Original title : Ealaa masharif alqarn alkhamis eashar alhijrii ) Dar Al-Shorouk, Egypt, 1979 / fourth edition 1989.
- “Instead of getting lost” ( Original title : Surat min altayhi ) Dar Al-Shorouk.
- Sectarianism is the last paper for the high on earth, Dar Al-Asr Al-Hadith, 1987, ( Original title : Altaayifiat akhar waraqat lilealin fi al'ard, dar aleasr alhadith, 1987 ) / Dar Al-Manahil, 2006.
- Imam Al-Shafi’i - a revolutionary advocate, founder of science, and imam of doctrine, ( Original title: Al'iimam alshaafieiu - Daeiat thawrat, Wamuasis Eilam, Wa'iimam Madhhab ) Yemeni Studies and Research Center, London, 1993 / Dar Al-Manahil, 2000.
- Two Testimonies: The Way of Life, ( Original title : Shahadatan Huma Manhaj Hayat ) Dar Al-Manahil, 1999.
- Islamic Concerns and Hopes, ( Original title: Humum Wamal 'iislamiat ) Dar Al-Manahil, 1999.
- The Journey of Jihad Explaining Facts and Advice by Mashanq Amin, ( Original title : Masirat Jihad Tibyan Haqayiq Wanasah Mishnaq 'Amin ) Dar Al-Manahleen 2003.
- An Invitation to Dialogue and Discussion, The Approach to Life, an Islamic Jurisprudential Vision, ( Original title : Daewat Lilhiwar Walniqash, Almanhaj Lilhayat, Ruyat Ajtihadiat 'iislamiat ) Dar Al-Manahil, 2004.
