= Al-Gawhara Palace =

Palace and museum in Cairo, Egypt

Coordinates: 30°01′41″N 31°15′34″E

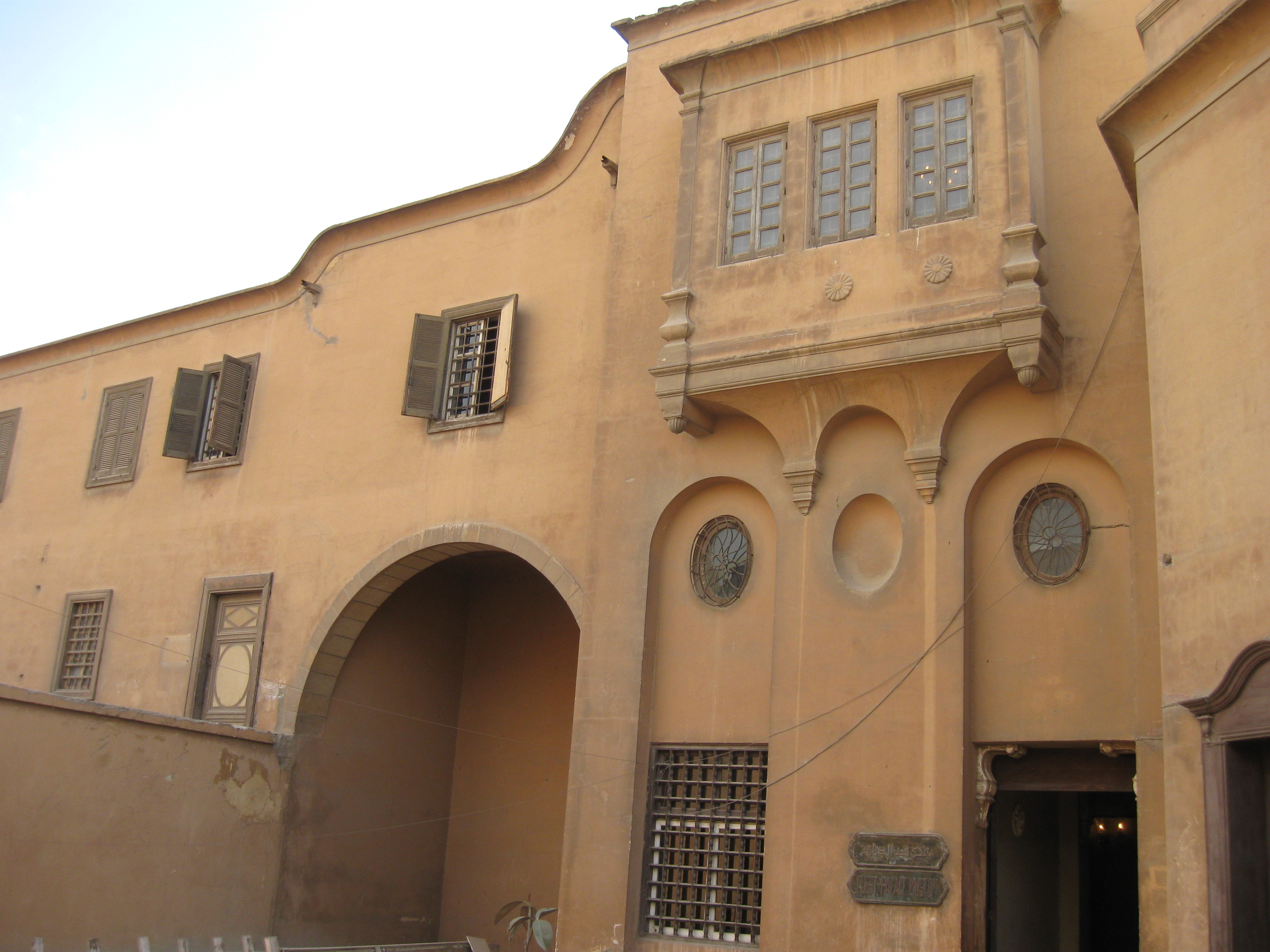
Al-Gawhara Palace.

Al-Gawhara Palace (Arabic: قصر الجوهرة Qaṣr al-Gawhara), also known as Bijou Palace, is a palace and museum in Cairo, Egypt. The palace is situated south of the Mosque of Muhammad Ali in the Cairo Citadel. It was commissioned by Muhammad Ali Pasha in 1814.

== Design ==
The palace is named after Gawhara Hanem, the last of Muhammad Ali's wives, and was reportedly built as a private residence for her. It also housed his guests and administrative offices. The building has two floors. The ground floor holds the main reception hall, two smaller halls, the throne hall and a garden known as the Lions Garden, while the upper floor contains royal suites. A large gilt-and-marble mirror stands at the entrance, and its best-known rooms include the Clocks Hall and the Documents Hall.

== History ==
The palace was designed and constructed by artisans contracted from a variety of countries, including Greeks, Turks, Bulgarians and Albanians. The artisans constructed a variety of elements as part of the palace complex: "barracks, schools, an arsenal, a gun-powder factory and a mint." In 1822, a fire destroyed the palace's wooden construction in a blaze that lasted for 2 days. Later, Muhammad Ali had the structure expanded and elaborated upon with the construction of "a large marble fountain, columned stone terraces and porticoes, parterres of flower beds and orange groves, and even a menagerie containing a lion, two tigers and an elephant, a gift of the British Lord Hastings."

Two years later, in 1824, fire again damaged the palace after explosions of gunpowder. Muhammad Ali imported large slabs of marble from Italy to build a vestibule, staircase and corridors.In 1825, English traveler Anne Catherine Elwood described the opulence of the palace, and in particular its grand room that could "offer dancing, had deep niches for conversation, and side rooms for music, reading, games and refreshment." Muhammad Ali's official divan or audience hall, where the pasha received guests, contains a 1000 kg chandelier sent to him by Louis-Philippe I of France. The palace also contains the throne of Muhammad Ali Pasha that was a gift from the King of Italy.

A fire in 1972, reportedly after an attempted theft, left the building practically gutted. It was restored and reopened in 1983 with new halls, including the Kaaba Hall, which displays parts of the Kaaba's Kiswah, and a display of furniture used by Empress Eugénie de Montijo, wife of Napoleon III, during her stay in Egypt. A 2017 report said it had been closed for many years.

== See also ==
- List of museums in Egypt
