= Cairo Citadel =

Medieval Islamic-era fortification in Egypt

Coordinates: 30°01′46″N 31°15′41″E

Cairo Citadel قلعة صلاح الدين الأيوبي
- Islamic Cairo, Cairo, Egypt
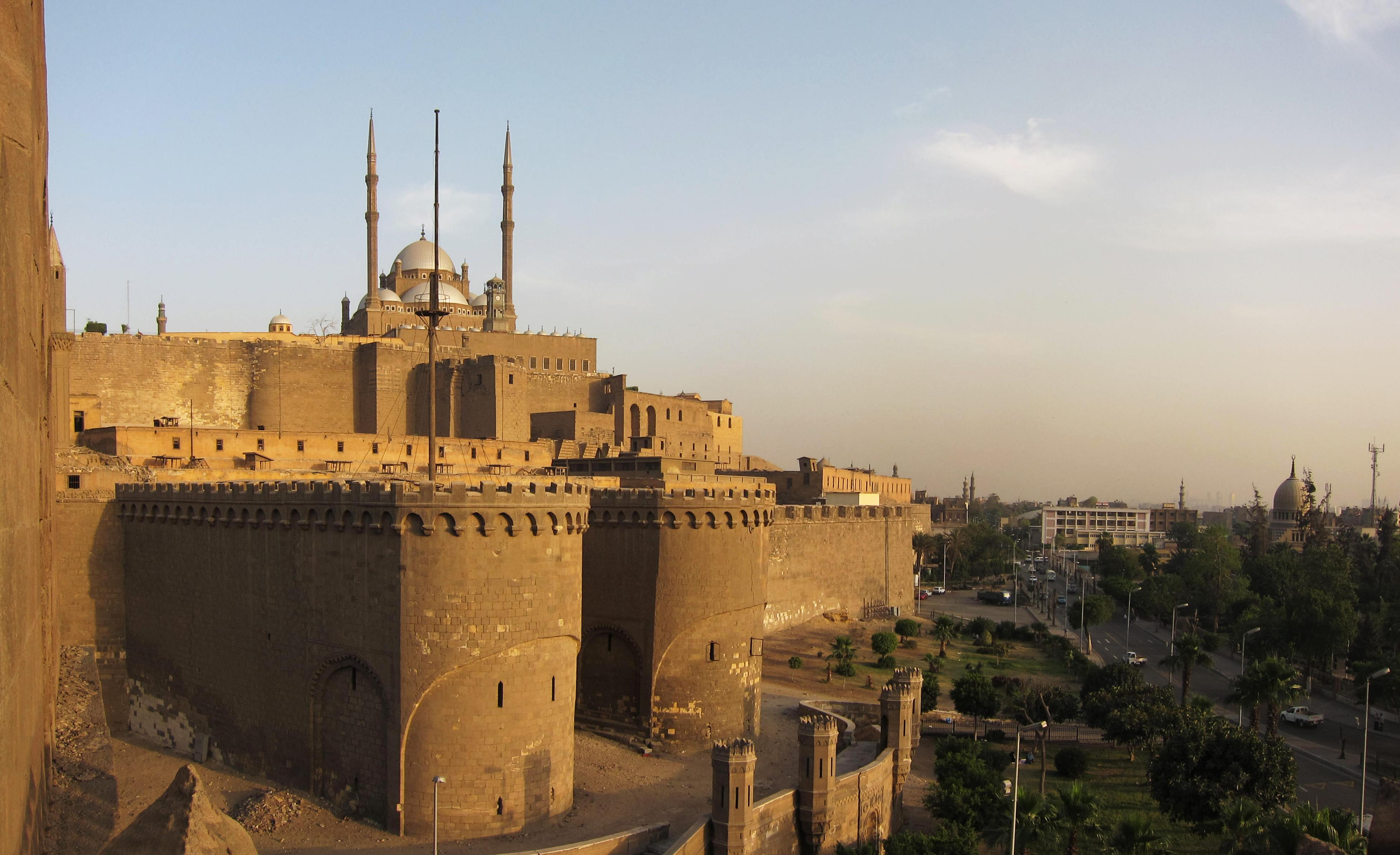
- View of the Citadel, with the Ottoman-era gate of Bab al-'Azab, and the 19th-century Muhammad Ali Mosque

Site information
- Type: Citadel
- Condition: Intact

Site history
- Built: 1176–1183 (original construction); 1310–1341 (major modifications); 1805–1848 (major modifications)
- Built by: Saladin (1176–1183); An-Nasir Muhammad (1310–1341); Muhammad Ali Pasha (1805–1848)
- In use

UNESCO World Heritage Site
- Criteria: Cultural: (i)(v)(vi)
- Designated: 1979 (3rd session)
- Part of: Historic Cairo
- Reference no.: 89-002
- Materials: stone

The Citadel of Cairo or Citadel of Saladin (Arabic: قلعة صلاح الدين, romanized: Qalaʿat Salāḥ ad-Dīn) is a medieval Islamic-era fortification in Cairo, Egypt. Its construction was begun by Salah ad-Din al-Ayubi (Saladin) in 1176 and continued by subsequent Egyptian rulers. It was the seat of government in Egypt and the residence of its rulers for nearly 700 years from the 13th century until the construction of Abdeen Palace in the 19th century. Its location on a promontory of the Mokattam hills near the center of Cairo commands a strategic position overlooking the city and dominating its skyline. When it was constructed it was among the most impressive and ambitious military fortification projects of its time. It is now a preserved historic site, including mosques and museums.

In addition to the initial Ayyubid-era construction begun by Saladin, the Citadel underwent major development during the Mamluk Sultanate that followed, culminating with the construction projects of Sultan al-Nasir Muhammad in the 14th century. In the first half of the 19th century Mohammed Ali Pasha demolished many of the older buildings and built new palaces and monuments all across the site, giving it much of its present form. In the 20th century it was used as a military garrison by the British occupation and then by the Egyptian Army until being opened to the public in 1983. In 1979, it was proclaimed by UNESCO as a part of the World Heritage Site Historic Cairo (Islamic Cairo) which was "the new centre of the Islamic world, reaching its golden age in the 14th century."

== History ==
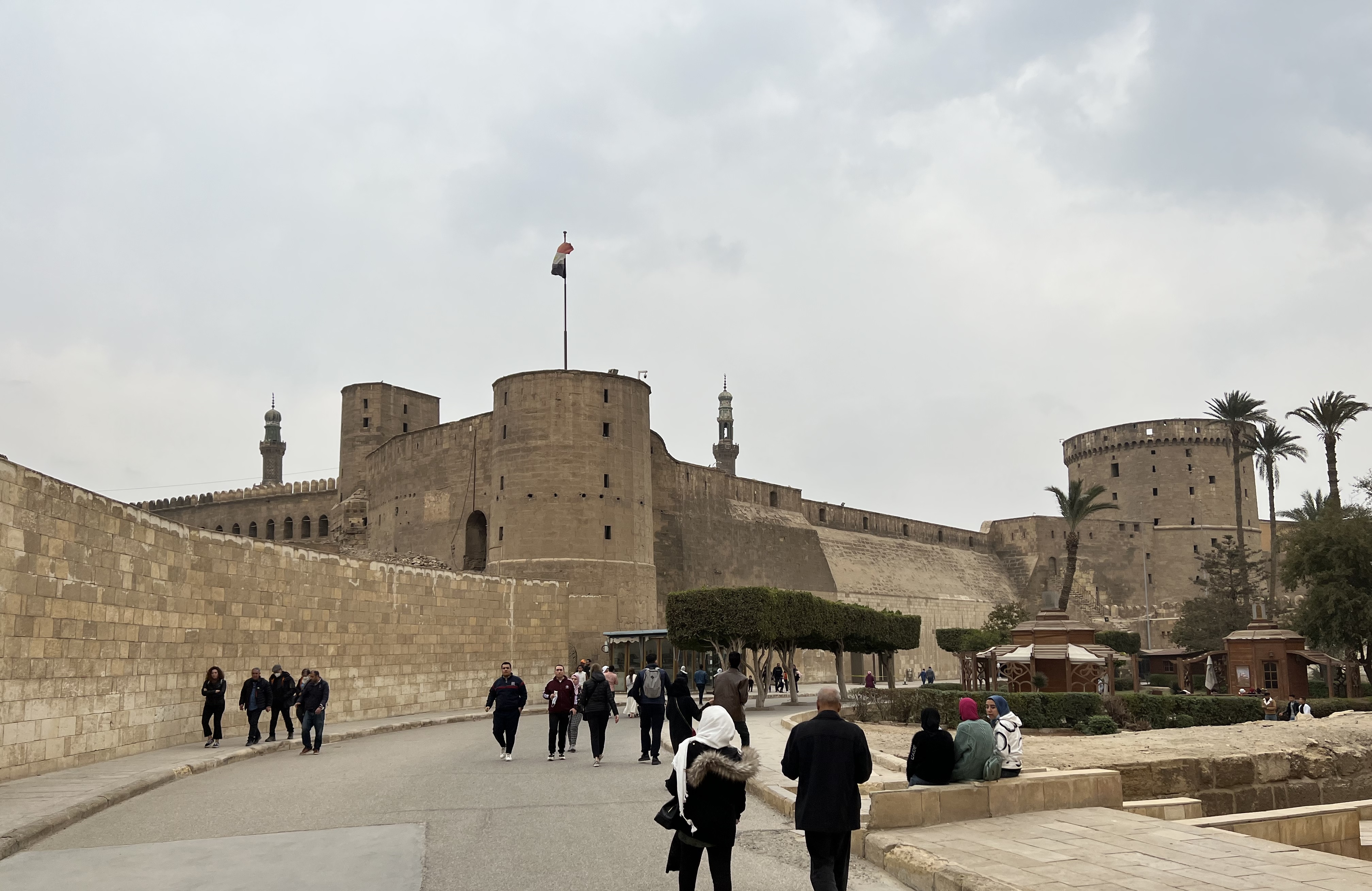
View of the Citadel near the visitor entrance today. The minarets of the 14th-century al-Nasir Muhammad Mosque can be seen in the background.

=== Overview ===
The Citadel was built on a promontory beneath the Muqattam Hills, a setting that made it difficult to attack. The efficacy of the Citadel's location is further demonstrated by the fact that it remained the heart of Egyptian government until the 19th century. During this long period, the layout and structure of the Citadel was repeatedly altered and adapted to suit the designs of new rulers and new regimes, which makes it difficult to reconstitute its original plan or even its plan in subsequent periods. There have been three major construction periods leading to the Citadel's current form: 12th-century Ayyubid (starting with Saladin), 14th-century Mamluk (under al-Nasir Muhammad), and in the 19th century under Muhammad Ali. The Citadel stopped being the seat of government when Egypt's ruler, Khedive Ismail, moved to his newly built Abdeen Palace in the new downtown Cairo in 1874. Despite its elaborate defenses, the Citadel never ended up being subjected to a true siege, though it was involved on various occasions in the political conflicts within Cairo or Egypt.

==== General layout ====
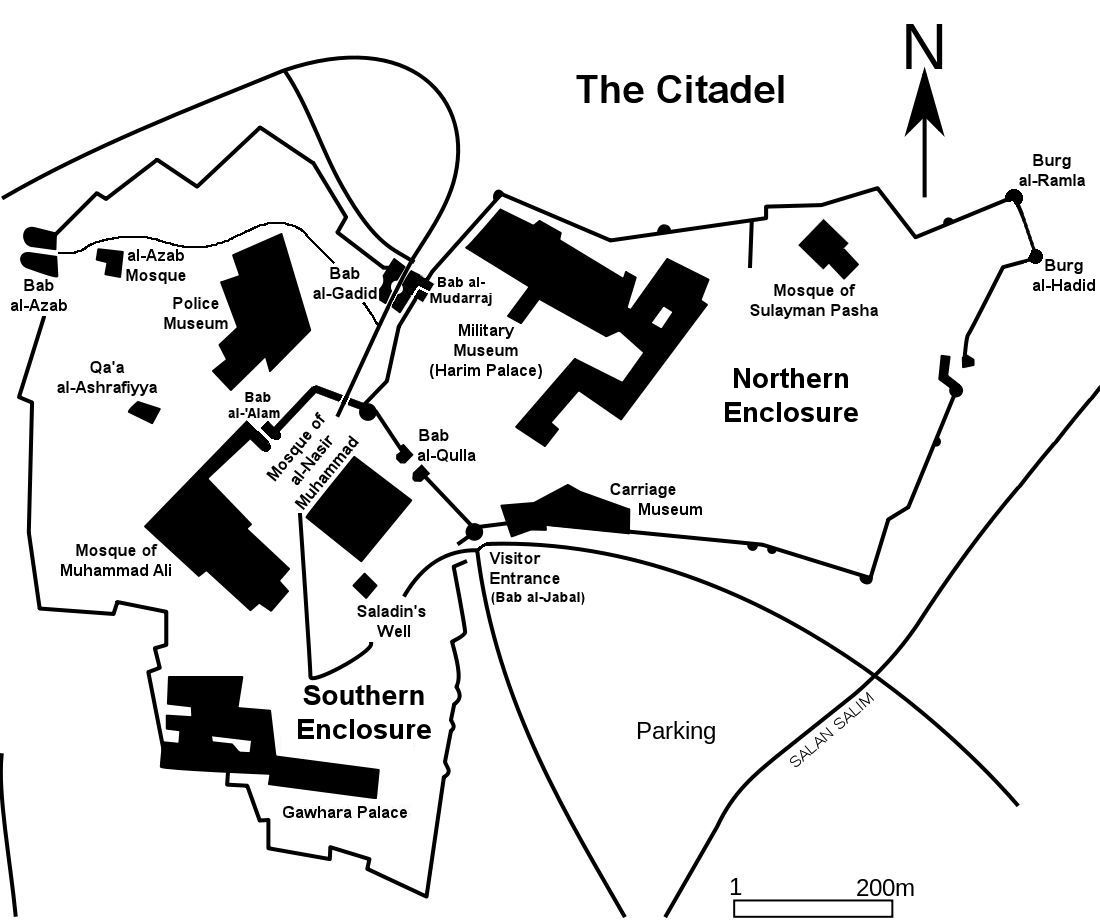
Layout of the Cairo Citadel today

In general, the fortress complex is divided into two parts: the Northern Enclosure (where the National Military Museum is located today), and the Southern Enclosure (where the Mosque of Muhammad Ali is located today). The Northern Enclosure was historically reserved for military garrisons, while the Southern Enclosure was developed as the residence of the sultan. There is also a lower, western enclosure which was historically the site of the royal stables of the Mamluks. However, these functional distinctions were largely erased in the 19th century under Muhammad Ali Pasha, who overhauled the entire site and constructed buildings of various functions throughout the Citadel.

To the west and southwest of the Citadel was a long open field frequently referred to as the "hippodrome" by historians or as the Maydan ("plaza" or "square"). For centuries this was maintained as a training ground (especially for horsemanship) and as a military parade ground. Its outline is still visible in the layout of the roads (mainly Salah ad-Din Street) on this side of the Citadel.

At the northern end of this hippodrome was another square or plaza known as Rumayla Square (Maydan/Midan Rumayla), today known as Salah al-Din Square (Midan Salah ad-Din) or Citadel Square (Midan al-Qal'a). This was used as a horse market (due to its adjacency to the royal stables), but also as an official square for royal and religious ceremonies. It is occupied today by a large roundabout next to which are the massive mosques of Sultan Hassan and al-Rifa'i.

=== Ayyubid foundation and construction: 12th–13th centuries ===
==== Saladin's original construction ====
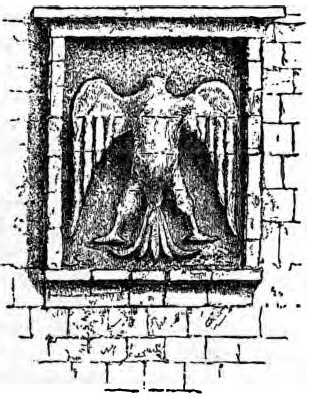
19th-century sketch of the Eagle of Saladin on the citadel walls. The eagle became the coat of arms of Egypt.

The Citadel was begun by the Muslim Ayyubid ruler Salah al-Din (Saladin) between 1176 and 1183 CE in order to protect Cairo from potential Crusader attacks and to provide a secure center of government for his new regime (only a few years after he had dismantled the Fatimid Caliphate). This also emulated a feature of many Syrian cities, such as Damascus and Aleppo, which had walled citadels that acted as the seat of power and which Saladin was familiar with. Saladin also set out to build a wall, around 20 kilometres long, that would surround both Cairo and Fustat (the nearby former capital), and is recorded as saying: "With a wall I will make the two [cities of Cairo and Fustat] into a unique whole, so that one army may defend them both; and I believe it is good to encircle them with a single wall from the bank of the Nile to the bank of the Nile." The Citadel would be the centerpiece of the wall. While the Citadel was initially completed in 1183–1184, the wall Saladin had envisioned was still under construction in 1238, long after his death. It does not appear to have ever been fully completed after this, though long segments were built.

Saladin charged his chief eunuch and close confidant, Baha al-Din Qaraqush, with overseeing the construction of the new fortifications. Most of the structure was built with limestone quarried from the surrounding Muqattam Hills; however, Qaraqush also quarried a number of minor pyramids at Giza and even as far away as Abusir in order to obtain further materials. He also made use of labour provided by Christian prisoners of war captured in Saladin's victories against the Crusaders. The initial fortress built in Saladin's time consisted essentially of what is today's Northern Enclosure, although not all elements of the Northern Enclosure's current walls are original. The southeast and northeast sections of these walls are likely the closest to their original forms. Also from Saladin's time is the so-called Yusuf's Well, a deep well accessed through a spiral staircase which provided water for the fortress. The original southwestern section of Saladin's enclosure has disappeared but is likely to have extended around this well and around the current site of al-Nasir Muhammad Mosque (making the original enclosure slightly bigger than the existing Northern Enclosure today). The carved image of a double-headed eagle, found near the top of one of the towers of the western walls (near the Police Museum), is a curious feature which is popularly attributed to Salah ad-Din's reign. It was probably located elsewhere originally and then moved here at some point when the walls were rebuilt in Muhammad Ali's time. The eagle's heads are missing today, but their original appearance was noted by chroniclers.

Only one original gate, Bab al-Mudarraj, has survived to the present day. It is located along the walls of the Northern Enclosure, nowadays between the Harem Palace (National Military Museum) and the newer Bab al-Jadid gate. It was originally the main gate of the Citadel, but today it is obscured by later constructions from Muhammad Ali's time, including the Bab al-Jadid ("New Gate"). Its name was derived from the carved stone steps (darraj) which led up to it from the path that connected the Citadel to the city below. Like other gateways in Ayyubid military architecture, it had a bent entrance. Today, the inside of the gate's dome-vault is covered in plaster with painted inscriptions belonging to Sultan al-Nasir Muhammad and dated to 1310. It was also on this gate that a foundation inscription was discovered which dates the completion of the Citadel to 1183–1184. Nonetheless, construction of one kind or another almost certainly continued under Saladin's Ayyubid successors.

==== Construction under Saladin's successors ====
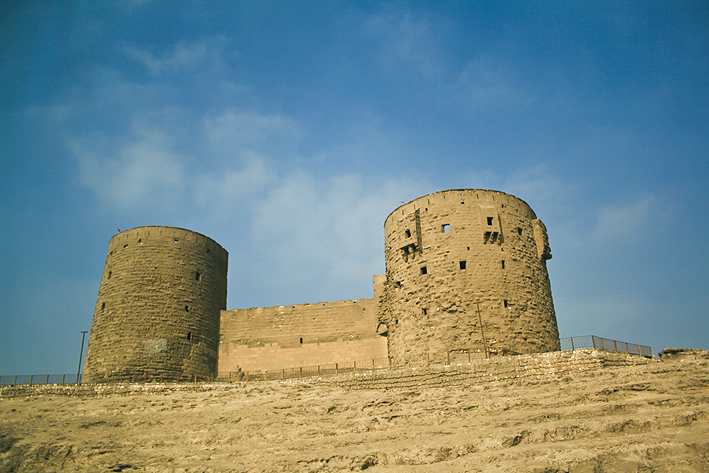
The two easternmost towers, fortified by al-Kamil in 1207: the Burj al-Ramla and the Burj al-Hadid

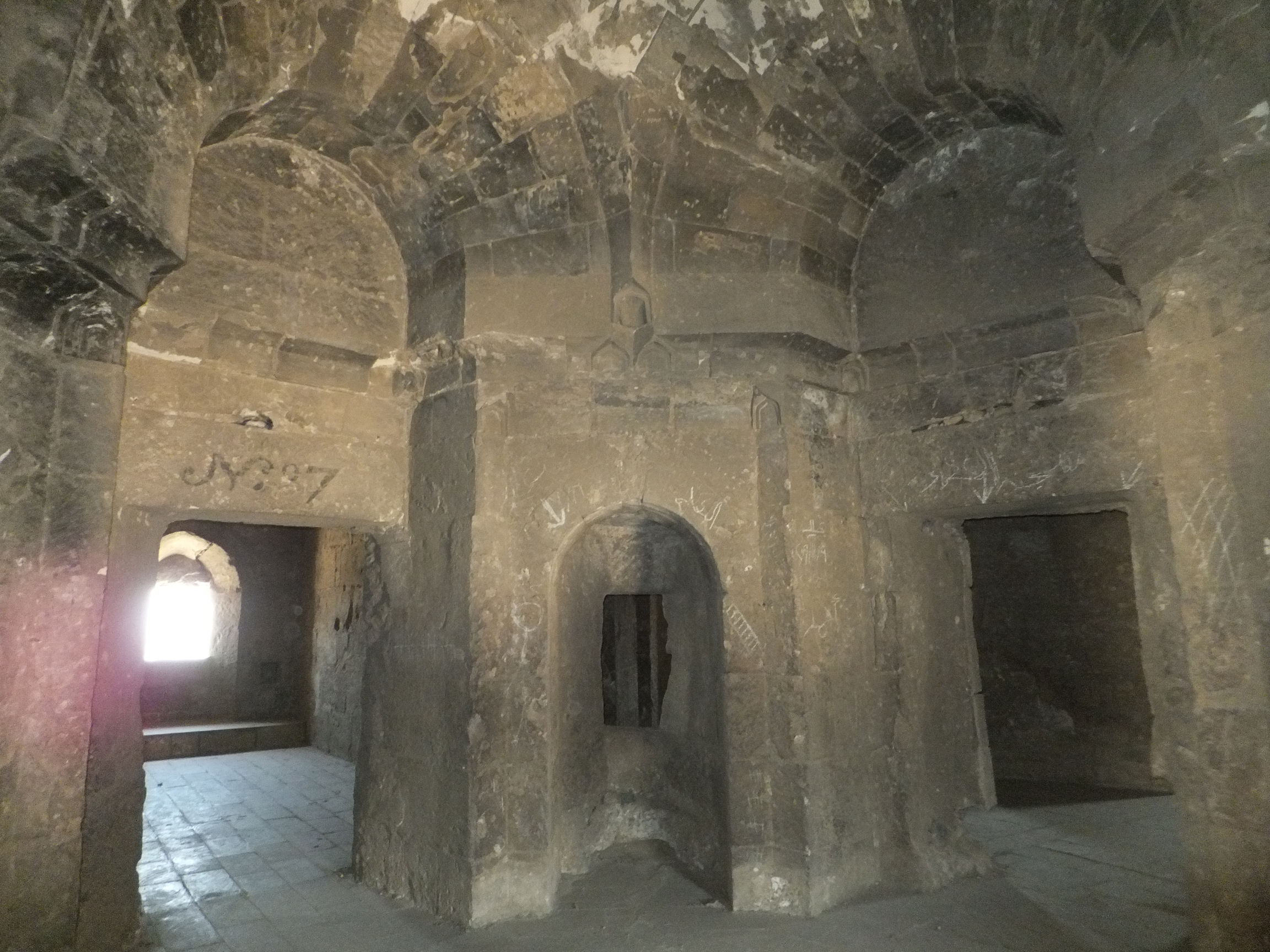
Chamber inside the Burj al-Ramla

Construction of the Ayyubid Citadel appears to have continued under Sultan al-'Adil (r. 1200–1218), Saladin's brother and later successor, and was probably finished under the reign of al-Kamil (1218–1238). Al-'Adil had already supervised some of the construction under Saladin, while al-Kamil in turn probably worked on the Citadel during al-'Adil's reign when the latter gave him the viceroyship of Egypt in 1200 (a prelude to becoming sultan later). The rounded towers in the outer walls of the Northern Enclosure date from Saladin's initial construction while the large rectangular towers date to al-Adil's reign. The two large round towers in the far northeastern corner of the enclosure, known as Burj al-Ramla ("Tower of Sand") and Burj al-Hadid ("Tower of Iron") are towers from Saladin's time which al-Kamil subsequently reinforced in 1207.

More significantly, al-Kamil built or completed the palaces in the southern section of the Citadel, and became the first ruler to actually move there in 1206. In addition to the palaces, a number of other structures were built, including a mosque, a royal library, and a "hall of justice". In 1213 al-Kamil also established a horse market on what became Rumayla Square (the square between the Citadel and Sultan Hasan's mosque today), as well as a maydan, a long open square or "hippodrome", to the west and south of the Citadel which was used for equestrian training and military parades. This was on the same site that Ahmad ibn Tulun established a similar hippodrome in the 9th century. This work established the overall plan of the Citadel area for centuries to come: the northern part of the citadel was devoted to military functions, the southern part to the sultan's private residence and the state administration, and outside, at the southwestern foot of the Citadel, was the parade ground which remained for centuries. Al-Kamil was likely also responsible for building or completing the first water aqueduct which ran along the top of Saladin's city walls to the southwest and brought water from the Nile to the Citadel.

Sultan al-Salih Ayyub (r. 1240–1249) subsequently moved away from the Citadel again and built himself a new fortified enclosure on Roda Island (which also became the barracks of the Bahri Mamluks who took power after him). Only under the Mamluks, who ruled from 1250 to 1517, did the Citadel finally become the permanent residence of the sultans.

=== Mamluk period: 13th–16th centuries ===
==== Early Bahri Mamluk period ====
Under the early Bahri Mamluks, the Citadel was continuously developed and the Southern Enclosure in particular was expanded and became the site of important monumental structures. al-Zahir Baybars, al-Mansur Qalawun, al-Ashraf Khalil and al-Nasir Muhammad each built or rebuilt the audience hall (throne hall), the main mosque, the palaces, or other structures. Unlike the earlier Ayyubid buildings, the Mamluk buildings were increasingly designed to be visible from afar and to dominate the city's skyline. Many of these structures have not survived, with few exceptions.

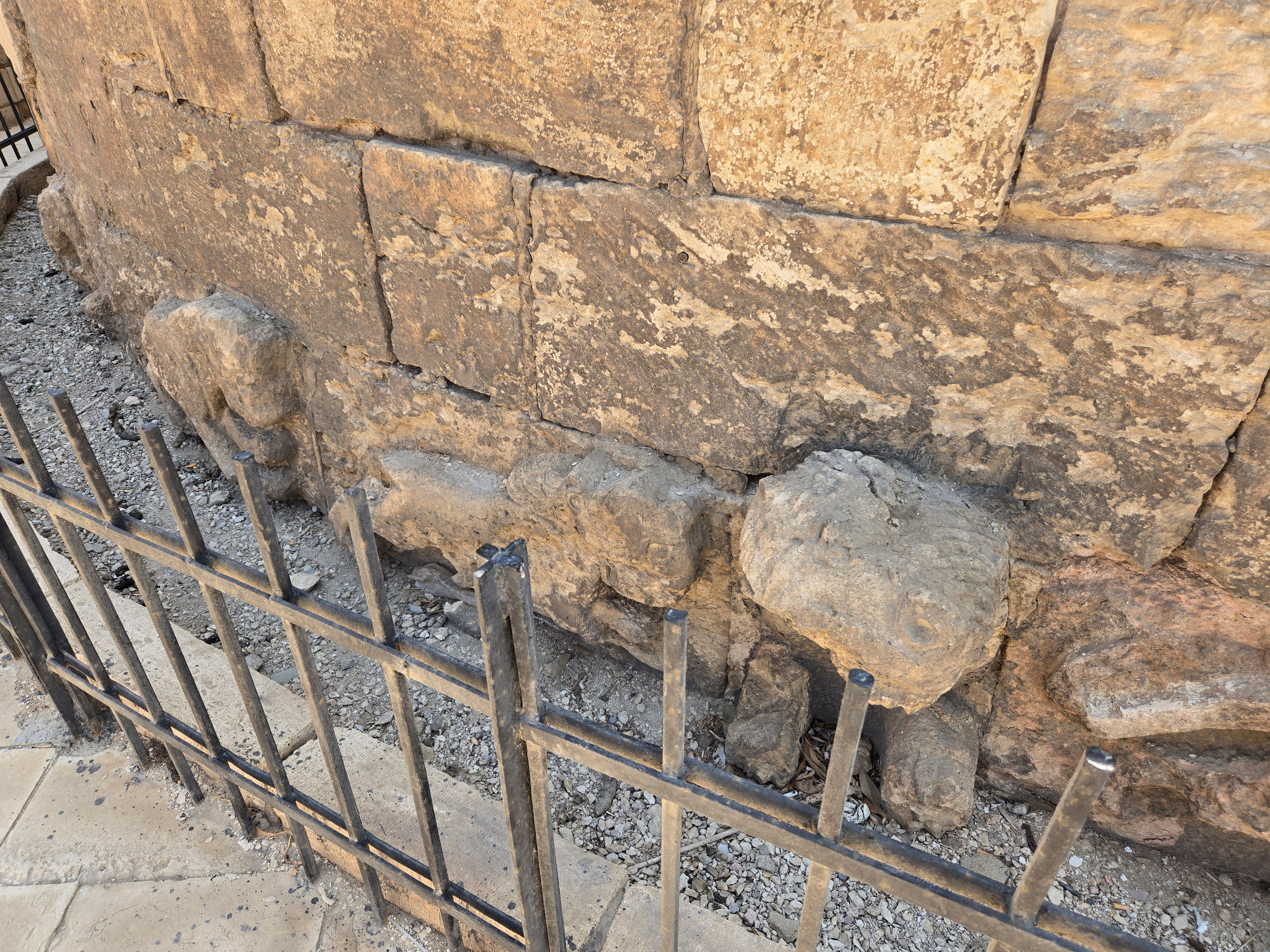
Stone frieze depicting lions, part of a former tower built by Sultan Baybars, next to the present-day Police Museum

Baybars (r. 1260–1277) was the first one to split the Citadel into two areas by building the Bab al-Qulla, the gate and wall which today separates the Southern and Northern Enclosures of the Citadel. It was named after a keep tower which he built nearby and which was later torn down by Qalawun. The gate itself was rebuilt again by al-Nasir Muhammad in 1320. The gate was intended to control access to the newly delimited Southern Enclosure which Baybars then developed into a more elaborate and more exclusive royal complex. A part of the Southern Enclosure became reserved for the harem, the private and domestic area of the sultan and his family, while another part became the site of more monumental structures whose functions were more public, ceremonial, or administrative. Among the structures he built here was one called the Dar al-Dhahab ("the Hall of Gold"), which he seems to have used as his private reception hall and which may have been located in the area of the present Police Museum. Another important structure he built in the area is referred to as the Qubba al-Zahiriyya ("the Dome of al-Zahir"), a monumental and richly decorated hall with a central dome which acted as an audience hall or throne hall. It may have been a new structure or an addition to an existing Ayyubid structure, and it was probably the predecessor of al-Nasir Muhammad's "Great Iwan". Baybars also built the Tower of the Lions (Burj al Siba'), a round tower which featured a stone-carved frieze of lions (Baybars' emblem) along its upper parts. The tower was obscured by later construction but its remains, including the lion carvings, were rediscovered in the late 20th century and are now visible on the northwestern side of the Police Museum.

Sultan al-Mansur Qalawun (r. 1279–1290) either built or significantly renovated a structure known as the Dar al-Niyaba which served as the palace of the sultan's vice-regent. He also demolished Baybars' Qubba al-Zahiriyya and replaced it with his own domed structure, the Qubba al-Mansuriyya. More significantly in the long run, Qalawun was the first to create elite regiments of mamluks (soldiers of slave origin) who resided in the various towers of the Citadel, which earned them the name "Burji" Mamluks (Mamluks of the Tower). It was these cohorts of mamluks who would eventually dominate the sultanate during the Burji Mamluk period.

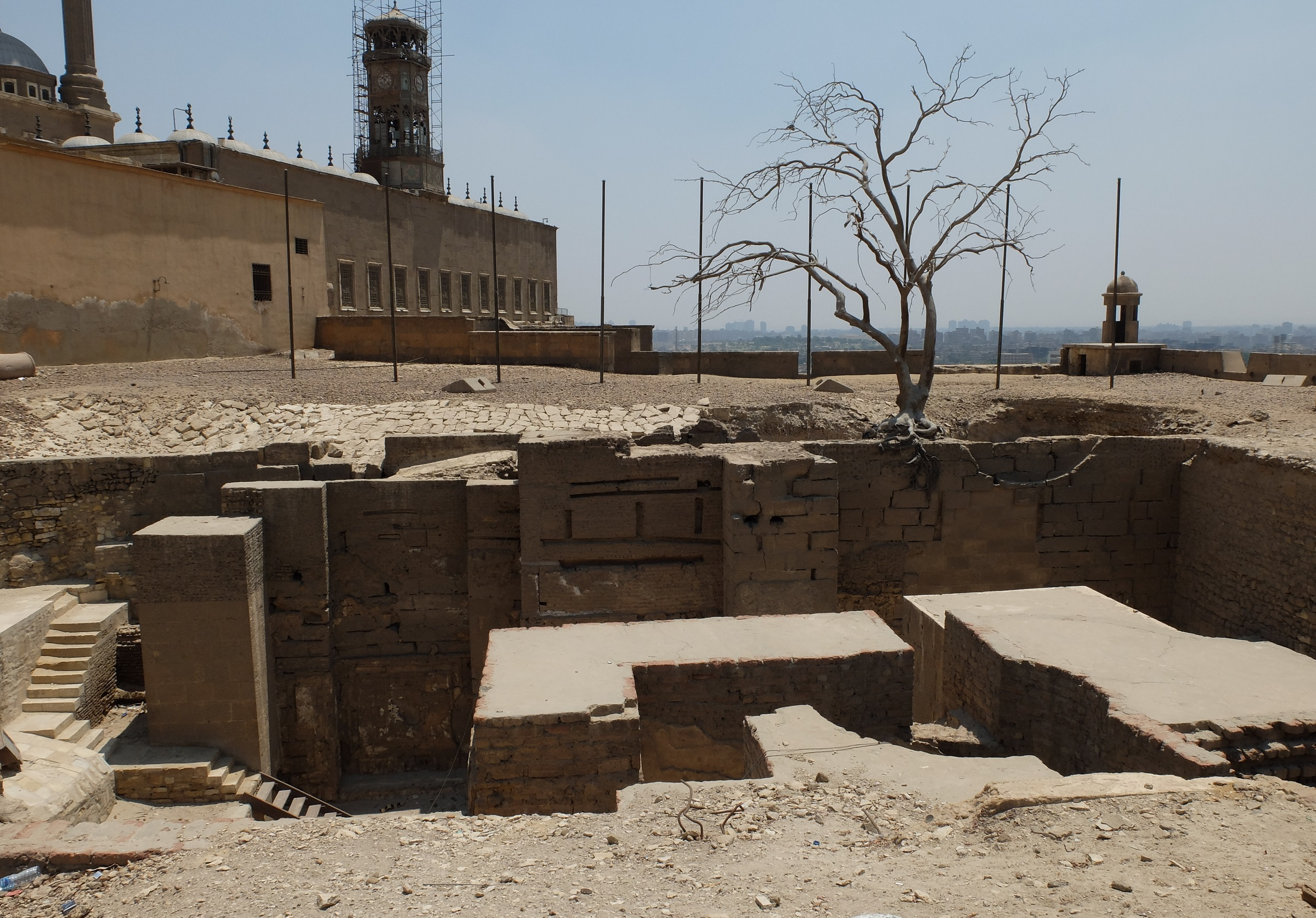
Excavated remains of the Qa'a al-Ashrafiyya (Reception hall of al-Ashraf Khalil), on the terrace in front of the modern Police Museum

Sultan al-Ashraf Khalil built a qa'a (reception hall) in 1291–1292, referred to as the Qa'a al-Ashrafiyya. Its remains were excavated in the late 20th century and are still visible today, just west of the present-day gate called Bab al-'Alam (Gate of the Flag), across the terrace from the current Police Museum. (Note: This site was originally identified by excavators as a part of the Qasr al-Ablaq (Ablaq Palace) of al-Nasir Muhammad, but Nasser Rabbat argued against this interpretation and identified it as the Qa'a al-Ashrafiyya; see Rabat (1995), The Citadel of Cairo: A New Interpretation of Royal Mamluk Architecture, and Abdulfattah & Sakr (2012), Glass Mosaics in a Royal Mamluk Hall. For more info on al-Nasir Muhammad's palace, see relevant sub-section in this article.) The remains indicate that the walls of the hall were decorated with multi-coloured marble paneling along the lower walls (a dado), above which was a small frieze of marble mosaics with mother-of-pearl and other marble reliefs, and above all this were panels of glass mosaics with scenes of trees and palaces which are reminiscent of the mosaics of the Umayyad Mosque and Mausoleum of Baybars in Damascus. (During excavations the mosaics were removed for study and restoration.) The hall also had a central octagonal fountain of marble and the floor was paved with marble mosaics arranged in geometric patterns. It was one of the few structures in this area which al-Nasir Muhammad did not destroy but instead re-used for various purposes, and in the Burji Mamluk period it seems to have replaced the Dar al-Niyaba as the palace of the vice-regent. Al-Ashraf also, once again, demolished the qubba or domed throne hall of his father Qalawun and replaced it with his own structure, the Iwan al-Ashrafiyya (the word "iwan" seems to have been used from then on for this particular type of building). This new throne hall differed from previous incarnations in one notable respect: it was painted with pictures of al-Ashraf's amirs (commanders), each with their rank inscribed above his head.

==== The reign of Sultan al-Nasir Muhammad ====
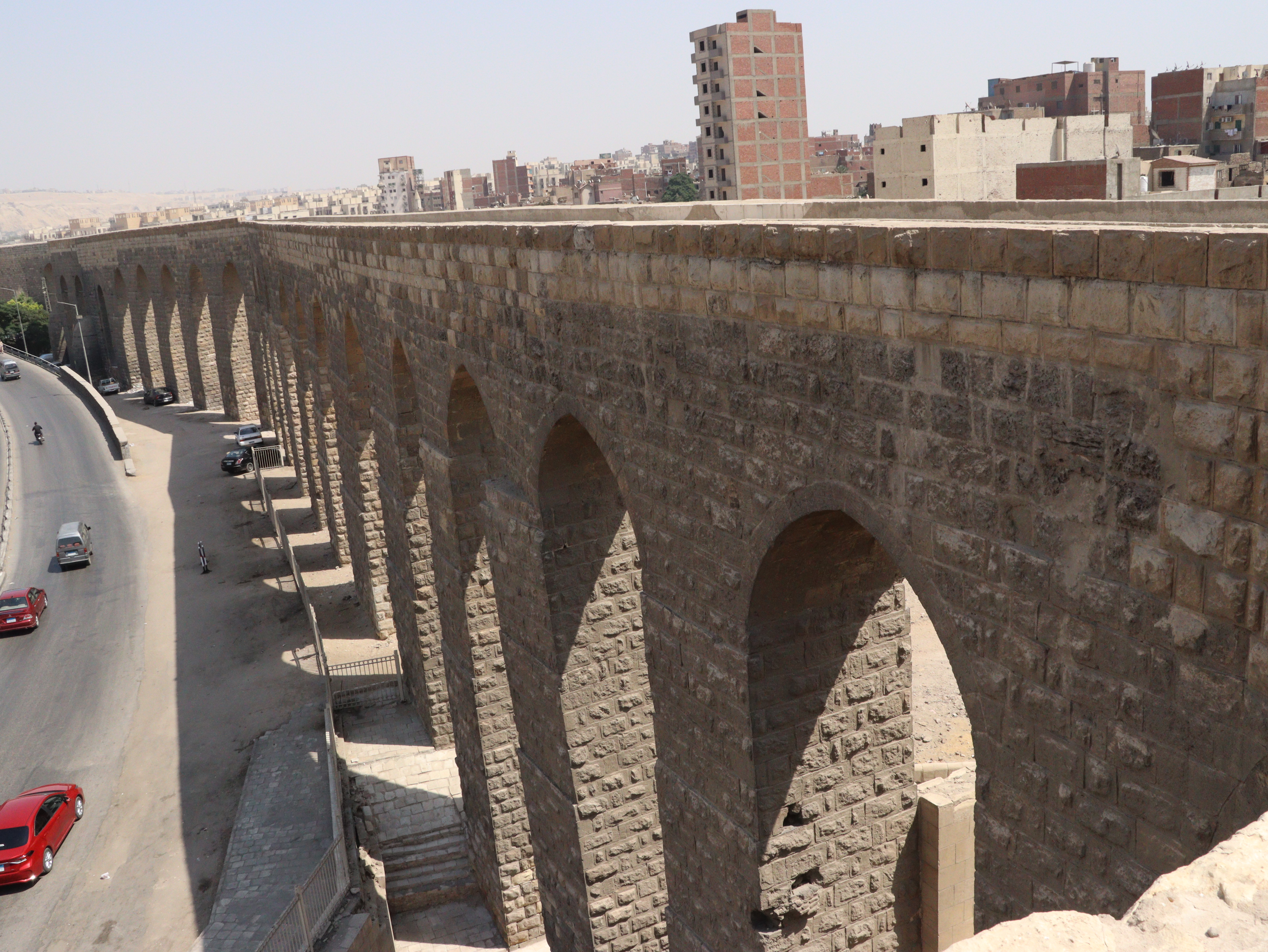
The Nile aqueduct that supplied water to the Citadel, largely built in the Mamluk period

The greatest builder of the Citadel during the Mamluk period was al-Nasir Muhammad, another son of Qalawun, who was sultan three times over a period of nearly fifty years between 1293 and 1341. It was most likely under his reign that the borders of the Southern Enclosure expanded to their current outline, in order to accommodate the new palaces and structures he built. He is responsible for several major works in the Citadel, though unfortunately most of them fell into ruin during the Ottoman period and were finally demolished by Muhammad Ali in the 19th century. In addition to his official palaces and his semi-public monuments in the Southern Enclosure, al-Nasir reserved the southeastern corner of the enclosure (the location of the al-Gawhara Palace today) for the palaces, private courtyard, and garden devoted to his harem (wives and concubines), probably as Baybars had done, called al-Qusur al-Jawwaniyya. He also commissioned new palaces outside the Citadel but nearby for his favourite amirs, and his projects encouraged the development of areas near the Citadel, such as al-Darb al-Ahmar.

In 1312 al-Nasir also ordered the renovation of the water aqueduct which brought water from the Nile to the Citadel. His predecessor, al-Ashraf, is responsible for building an octagonal water intake tower on the shores of the Nile, from which water was raised and transferred along the aqueduct, but al-Nasir completed the project. This improvement of the infrastructure allowed him in turn to embark on more ambitious projects within the Citadel.

===== The Ablaq Palace (Qasr al-Ablaq) =====
Among the most important constructions was the Ablaq Palace (Qasr al-Ablaq; sometimes translated as the "Striped Palace"), built in 1313–1314. Its name derived from the red-and-black ablaq masonry that marked its exterior. It may have been partly inspired by the palace of the same name that Sultan Baybars had built in Damascus in 1264 and in which al-Nasir resided when he visited that city. The palace was used for regular receptions and private ceremonies. It was connected to the Great Iwan (see below) by a private passage or corridor which led to the sultan's entrance in the back wall of the Iwan. The walls of the palace itself formed a part of the new outer boundary of the Citadel's enclosure: it was located on an escarpment overlooking the city below, and the escarpment, along with the foundation walls of the palace, acted as the effective outer wall of the Citadel at its western corner. Because of this, al-Nasir was able to build a loggia on the side of the palace from which he could freely observe the activities in the stables and in the maydan (hippodrome) at the foot of the Citadel below, as well as a private door and staircase which gave him direct access between the palace and the hippodrome.

===== The Great Iwan (al-Iwan al-Kabir) =====
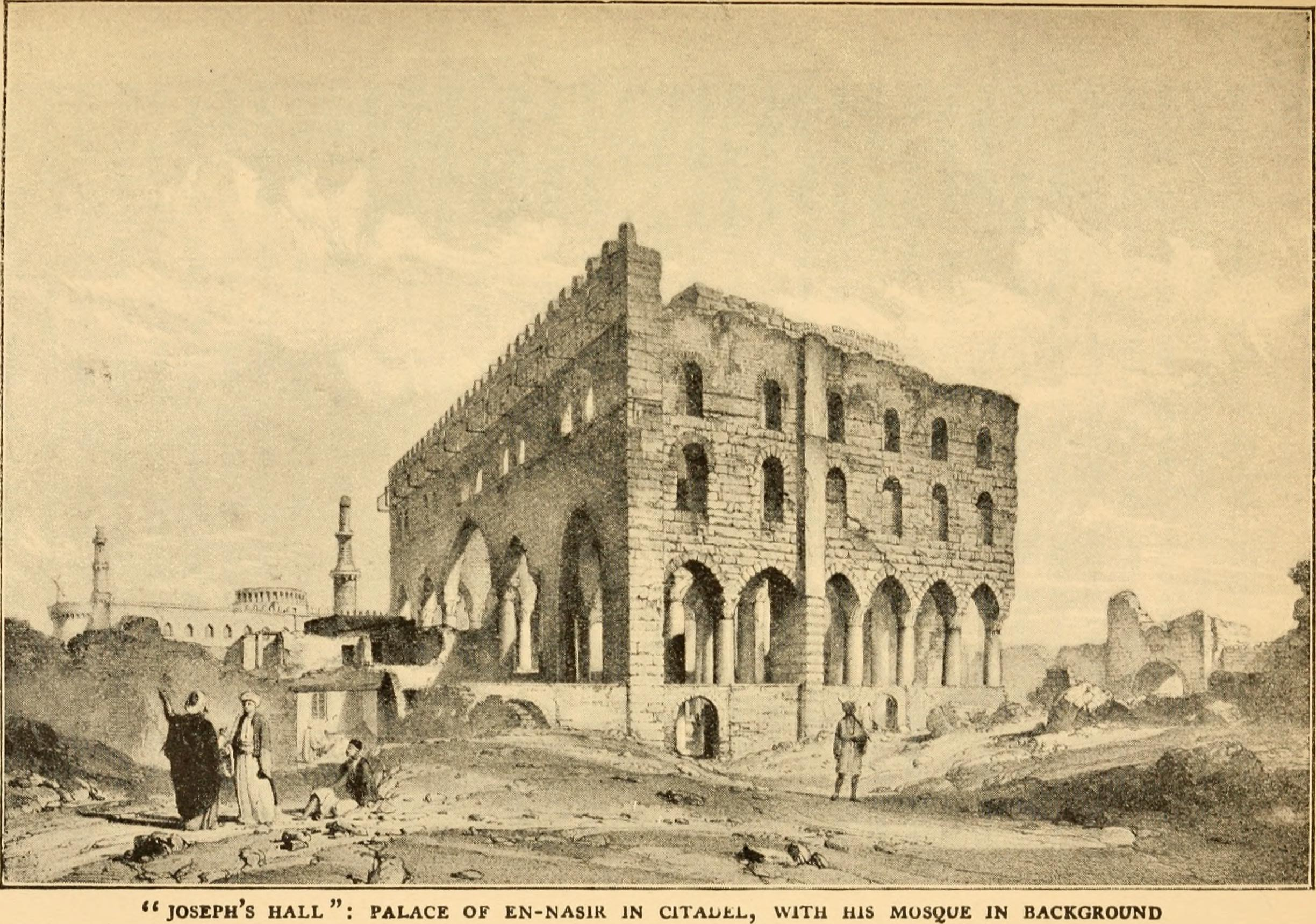
The ruins of the Great Iwan, as seen in the early 19th century (missing its dome), before it was demolished by Muhammad Ali

Al-Nasir demolished, yet again, the Iwan al-Ashrafiyya (throne hall) of his brother al-Ashraf in 1311, and replaced it with his own structure known as the Great Iwan (al-Iwan al-Kabir). This may have been out of a desire to make it appear even more prominent and monumental, as well as to perhaps accommodate larger ceremonies. In any case, he demolished it (either entirely or in part) and rebuilt it yet again in 1333, and it is this incarnation of the Great Iwan which survived up until the 19th century (when it was destroyed during Muhammad Ali's constructions). It was frequently cited by chroniclers as the most impressive structure in Cairo, more monumental than almost any of the Mamluk mosques. It served as the sultan's public and ceremonial throne room and continued to be used (albeit less consistently) by Mamluk sultans after him.

===== Al-Nasir Muhammad's Mosque =====
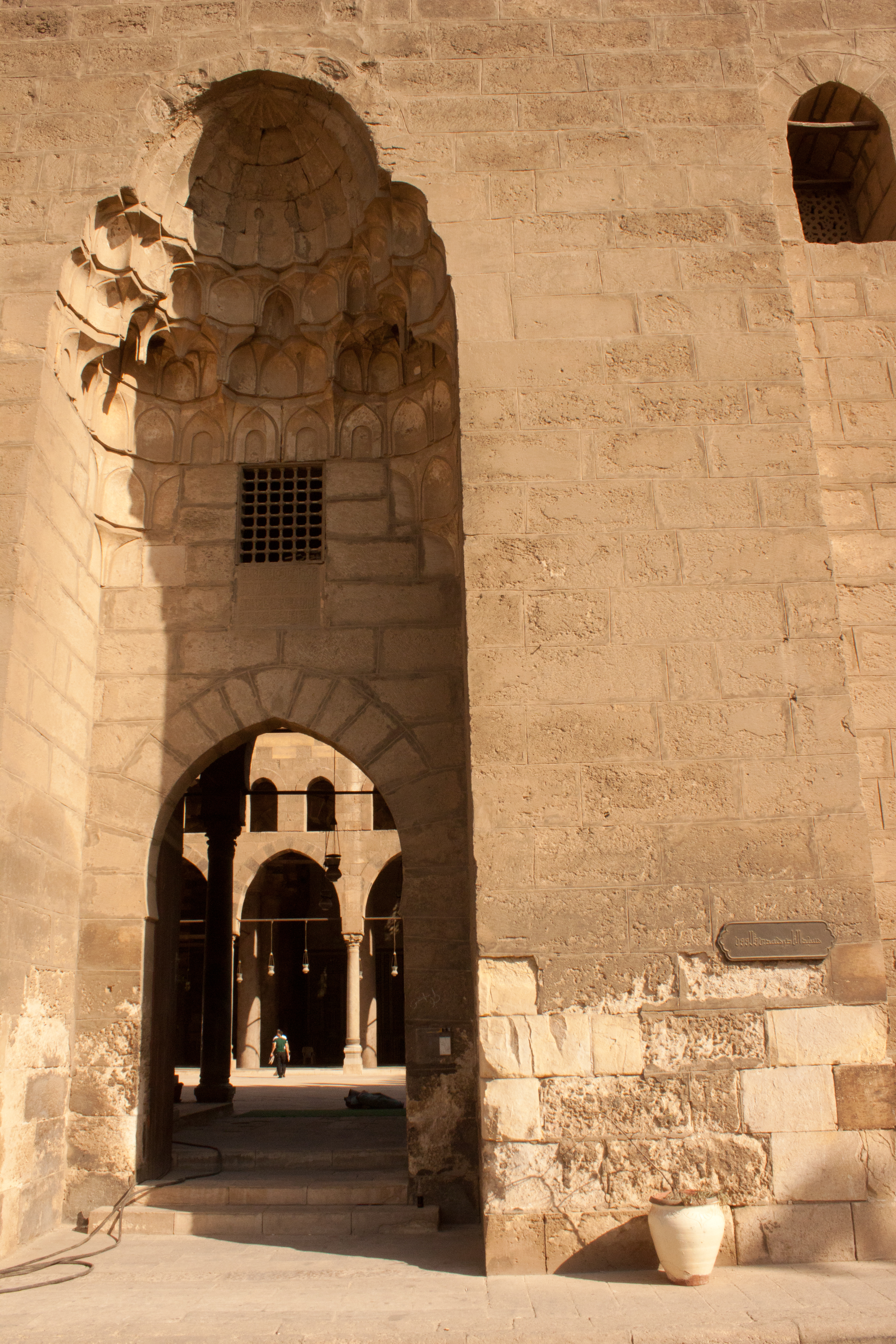
The entrance of the Mosque of al-Nasir Muhammad, with a typical Mamluk-era portal

Lastly, al-Nasir's other most notable contribution, and the only major structure of his reign still preserved at the Citadel, was the Mosque of al-Nasir, also situated in the Southern Enclosure. This was built in 1318 on the site of an earlier Ayyubid main mosque which he demolished in order to serve as the new grand mosque of the Citadel. Al-Nasir renovated his mosque again in 1335. Some of its huge columns were also re-used from Pharaonic-era buildings, much like the columns of the Great Iwan. While its structure is well preserved, most of its rich marble paneling decoration was stripped away and shipped to Istanbul by the Ottoman sultan Selim I after his conquest of Egypt.

==== Later Mamluk period ====
Subsequent sultans continued to build or add to the palaces and administrative buildings inside the Citadel, though rarely with the same ambition as al-Nasir Muhammad. Sultan al-Salih Isma'il (a son of al-Nasir who reigned from 1342 to 1345) built a richly decorated palace or hall known as al-Duhaysha (the "little wonder") which was inaugurated in February 1344. Likewise, Sultan Hasan (another son of al-Nasir) built a lavish domed palace known as the Qa'a al-Baysariyya, which was completed in 1360. It was over 50 metres tall and, in addition to a main hall covered by a dome, it also had a tower with an apartment for the sultan which was decorated with ivory and ebony. Other private apartments also had domes, while paintings and portraits decorated the walls. Both Isma'il and Hasan were sons of al-Nasir Muhammad. Sultan Hasan also built his massive madrasa-mosque just northwest of the Citadel, off Rumayla Square, in the 1350s and early 1360s (and still standing today). It was so large and tall that in later years it was reportedly used by rebels as a platform from which to bombard the Citadel on more than one occasion.

The Burji Mamluk period saw little construction in the Citadel by comparison with the earlier Mamluk period. The private harem courtyard in the southeastern corner of the Southern Enclosure, known as the hosh, became increasingly used to build new reception halls and other structures with slightly more public functions. The late Burji sultans Qaytbay and al-Ghuri built palaces in this part of the Citadel, on the site of what is now the 19th-century al-Gawhara Palace. Al-Ghuri also restored many other structures in and around the Citadel, including a major restoration/reconstruction of the Cairo Citadel Aqueduct. He also restored or reconfigured the Mamluk hippodrome at the southwestern foot of the Citadel, where he installed a vast pool which received water from the restored aqueduct.

=== Ottoman period: 16th–18th centuries ===
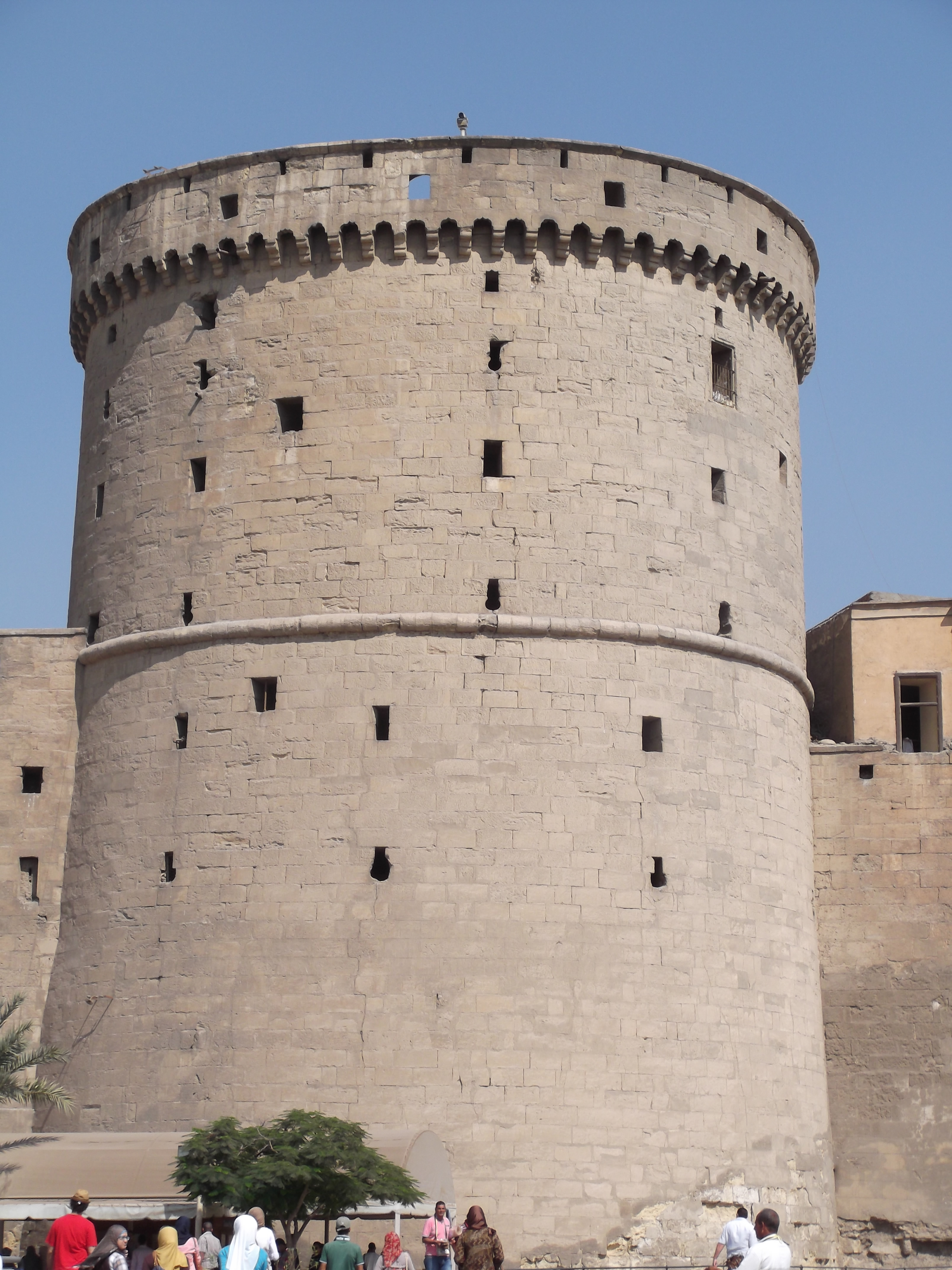
The Burj al-Muqattam, a tower built by the Ottoman governor Ibrahim Pasha around 1525

Egypt was conquered by the Ottoman Empire in 1517 and remained under Ottoman rule for centuries. Sultan Selim I stripped the monumental Mamluk buildings of their precious materials, especially their marble panels and decoration, and shipped them to Istanbul for use in his own building projects.

During this period the Citadel was neglected and many Mamluk structures fell into ruin, although some of the Citadel walls were rebuilt or extended in the 16th–17th centuries. Due to rivalries between different military corps in the Ottoman forces, the Citadel was divided into three areas to house three different elements of the Ottoman garrison: the Northern Enclosure housed the barracks of the Janissaries, the Southern Enclosure was used by the Ottoman pasha (governor) and his own troops, and another lower western enclosure, which contained the stables, housed the 'Azaban (or Azap) corps. Each section had its own mosque and facilities. In between them was a virtual no-man's-land where some of the former grand Mamluk buildings stood abandoned or under-used. This included the Great Iwan of al-Nasir Muhammad, whose large dome collapsed in 1521 and was never rebuilt. The Ablaq Palace was used more productively as a manufacturing center for weaving the Kiswah, the rich cloth covering the Kaaba in Mecca, which continued to come from Cairo until the 20th century.

Some notable structures were still created during this period. The huge round tower near the visitor entrance today, standing at the corner of the Southern and Northern Enclosures, was built by Ibrahim Pasha (the later grand vizier under Suleiman the Magnificent) in 1525 and is known as the Burj al-Muqattam ("Tower of the Muqattam Hills"). The round tower at the other corner of the two enclosures (between Bab al-Qulla and Bab al-Wastani), known now as Burj al-Wastani ("Middle Tower"), may also date from this time. The first mosque built in the Citadel after the Mamluk period was the Mosque of Sulayman Pasha in the Northern Enclosure, built by the Ottoman governor in 1528 for use by the Janissaries. It is one of the few mosques in Cairo that represents something close to the classical Ottoman architectural style.

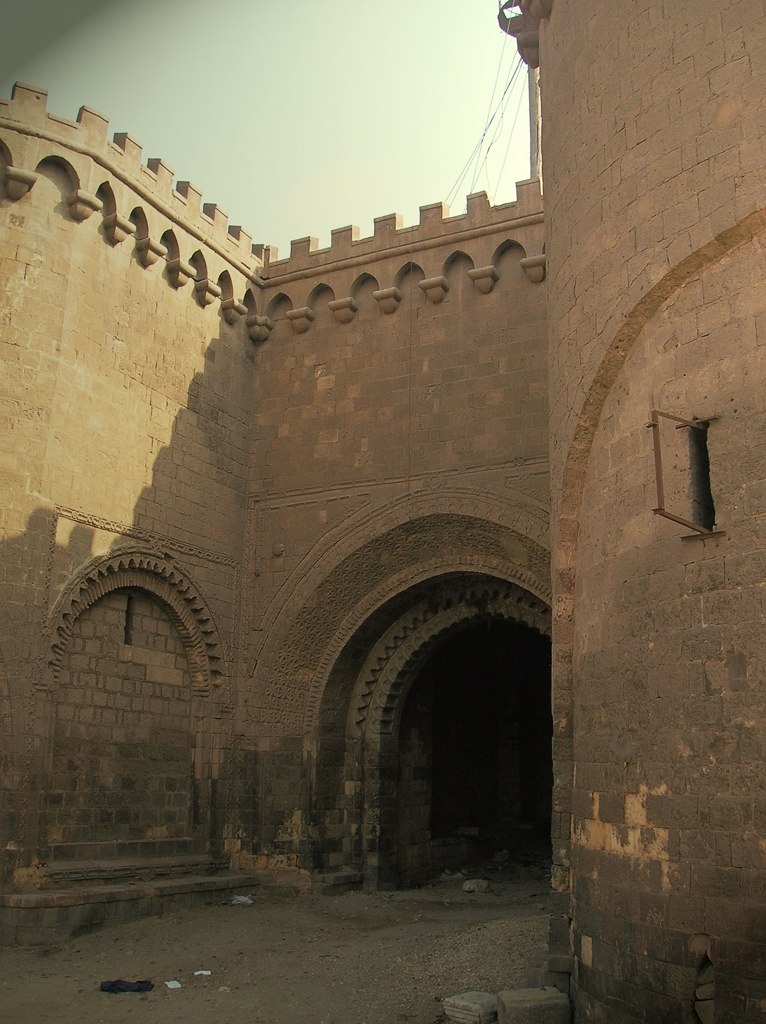
Bab al-'Azab, the northwestern entrance. Although built in 1754 during the Ottoman era, it emulates the Fatimid-era gate of Bab al-Futuh.

The lower, western enclosure which can be seen today below the Mosque of Muhammad Ali was historically the area which housed the stables of the Citadel. It's not clear when walls were first built around it, though they were likely already enclosed in Mamluk times. This enclosure was occupied by the 'Azaban soldiers, and contains the Mosque of al-'Azab which was built by Ahmad Katkhuda in 1697. (It is possible that Ahmad Katkhuda merely renovated an existing early Burji Mamluk mosque and added the present-day Ottoman-style minaret to it.) The rest of the area is presently occupied by various 19th-century buildings, including storehouses and old factories. The lower enclosure was accessed from the west through the monumental gate called Bab al-'Azab, which was built by Radwan Katkhuda al-Julfi in 1754, probably on the site of an earlier Mamluk gate known as Bab al-Istabl (Gate of the Stables). The gate was modeled on the old Fatimid gate of Bab al-Futuh in the north of Cairo, but its interior facade was later remodeled into a neo-Gothic style during the Khedival period.

The present-dat visitor entrance goes through the small western gate called Bab al-Jabal ("Gate of the Mountain") which was built by the Ottoman governor Yakan Pasha in 1785 when he rearranged the area to build a new palace. Yakan also rebuilt a small stretch of the adjoining wall south of here.

=== Muhammad Ali: 19th-century ===
Massacre of the Mamelukes by Horace Vernet, 1819

Muhammad Ali was a pasha of Albanian origin who was appointed by the Ottoman sultan in 1805 to restore order after the French occupation of Egypt (1798–1801). However, he subsequently established himself as de facto independent ruler of the country. He consolidated power through a famous and violent coup in 1811 which eliminated the remaining Mamluk class that still formed the country's elites. One of the most pivotal events of this coup took place in the Citadel. Muhammad Ali invited the Mamluk leaders to a celebration banquet in the Citadel, and as they were leaving and passing along the road leading from the upper Citadel to Bab al-Azab, regiments of his Albanian gunmen opened fire from above and massacred all of them.

The Citadel is sometimes referred to as the "Citadel of Muhammad Ali" (Arabic: قلعة محمد علي Qalaʿat Muḥammad ʿAlī). It contains the Mosque of Muhammad Ali, which he built between 1828 and 1848, perched on the summit of the citadel. This Ottoman-style mosque was built in memory of Tusun Pasha, Muhammad Ali's second son who died in 1816. However, it also represents Muhammad Ali's efforts to erase symbols of the Mamluk legacy that he sought to replace. Many of the former Mamluk structures, including the Great Iwan and the Ablaq Palace of al-Nasir Muhammad, were demolished in 1825 to make way for his new mosque and its renovated surroundings. Muhammad Ali himself was eventually buried in the mosque. His mosque also replaced the nearby Mosque of al-Nasir Muhammad as the Citadel's official main mosque. Muhammad Ali's mosque, with its large dome and tall pencil-like Ottoman minarets, is one of the most prominent monuments on Cairo's skyline to this day.

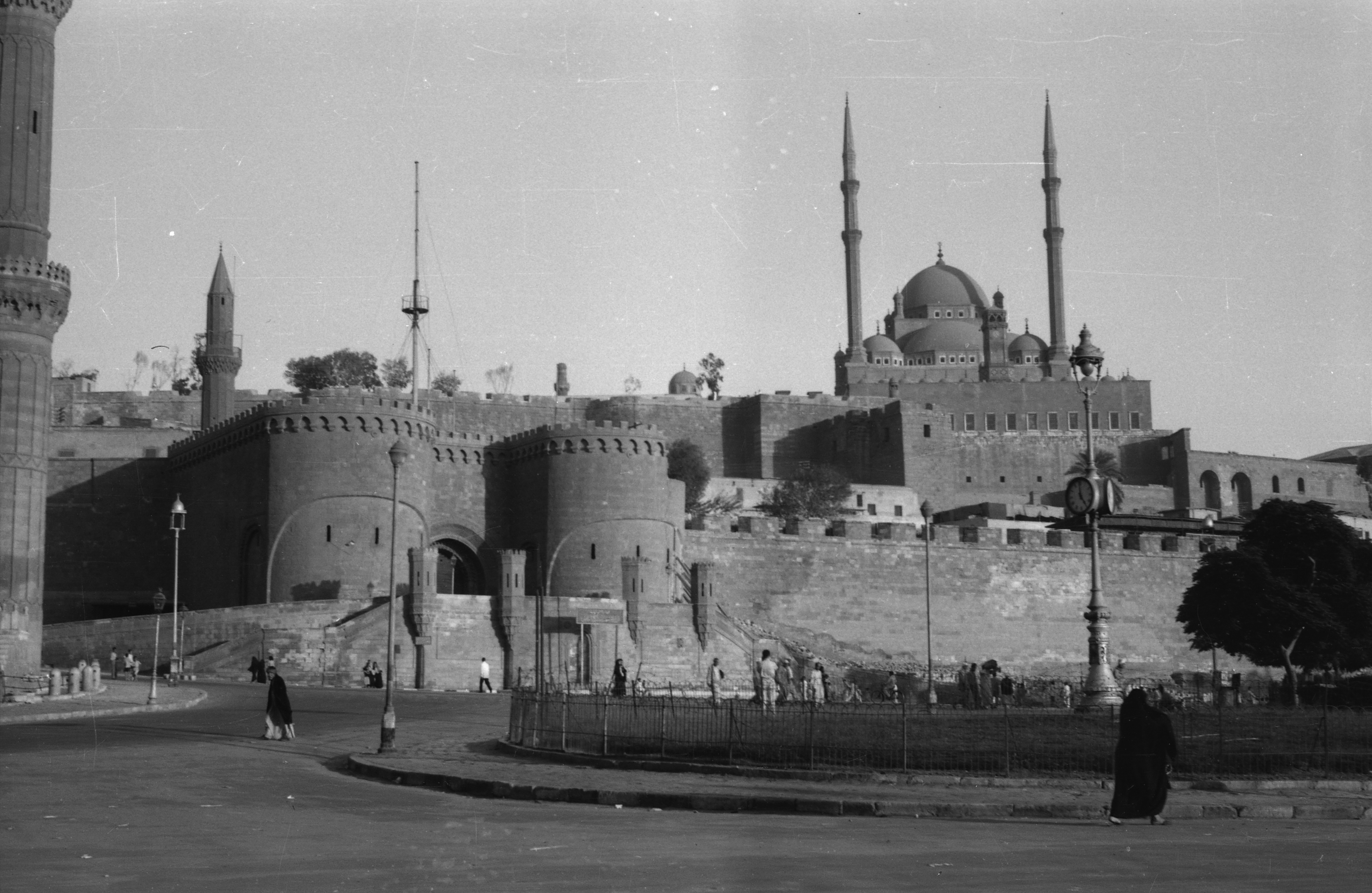
A view of the Citadel and the Mosque of Muhammad Ali, 1955

Another obvious change that Muhammad Ali enacted pertained to the uses of the Citadel's northern and southern enclosures: during the Mamluk period the Southern Enclosure was the royal residential area and the Northern Enclosure was mostly military, but Muhammad Ali built his Harem Palace (which now houses the National Military Museum) in the Northern Enclosure, erasing the old functional division between the two sections of the Citadel. He also built or rebuilt some of the walls. Notably, he rebuilt the Bab al-Qulla gate and the surrounding wall which separated the Northern and Southern enclosures from each other, giving it its current look. The gate's form today once again emulates the appearance of Bab al-Futuh but introduces some Turkish elements. In 1825 he also built the gate known as Bab al-Jadid (the "New Gate") at the point where a new carriage road entered the Citadel from the north. Around the same time he built the Bab al-Wastani (or Bab al-Wustani) ("Middle Gate") where the same road continues into the Southern Enclosure (just north of the Bab al-Qulla).

The Citadel eventually ceased to act as the residence of Egypt's ruler after Khedive Isma'il (Muhammad Ali's grandson) moved the court to the new 'Abdin Palace, located in the newly created districts of downtown Cairo, in 1874.

=== 20th century and present day ===
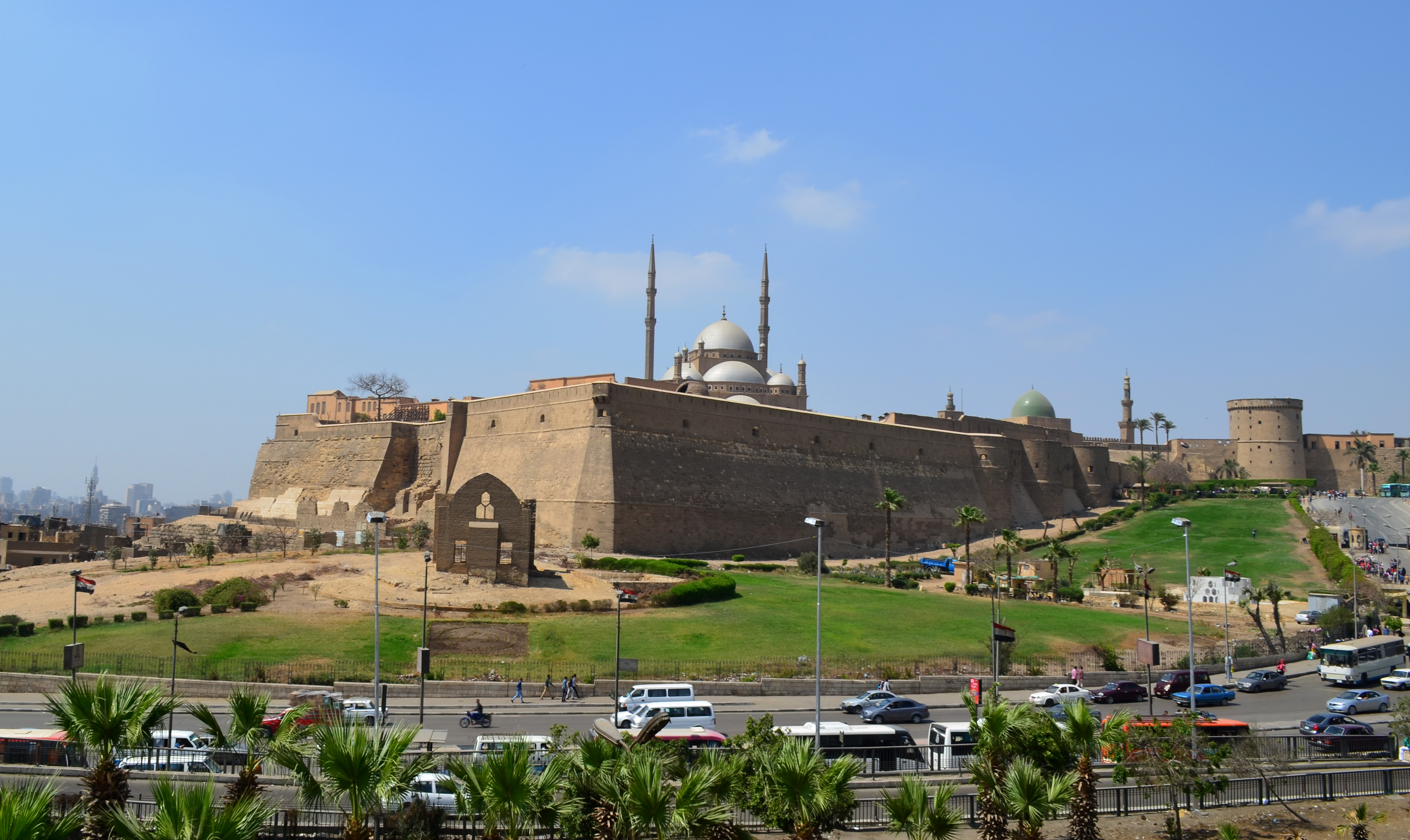
View of the Citadel from the southeast. The present-day visitor entrance is up the hill on the right.

For many years up to the late 20th century, the Citadel was closed to the public and used as a military garrison and base; at first by the British Army during the British occupation and afterward up to 1946, and since then by the Egyptian military. In 1983, the Egyptian government opened a large part of the Citadel to the public and initiated refurbishment programs to convert some of its old buildings into museums, though the military retains a presence. It is now a major tourist site for both Egyptians and foreigners alike.

== Water supply system ==
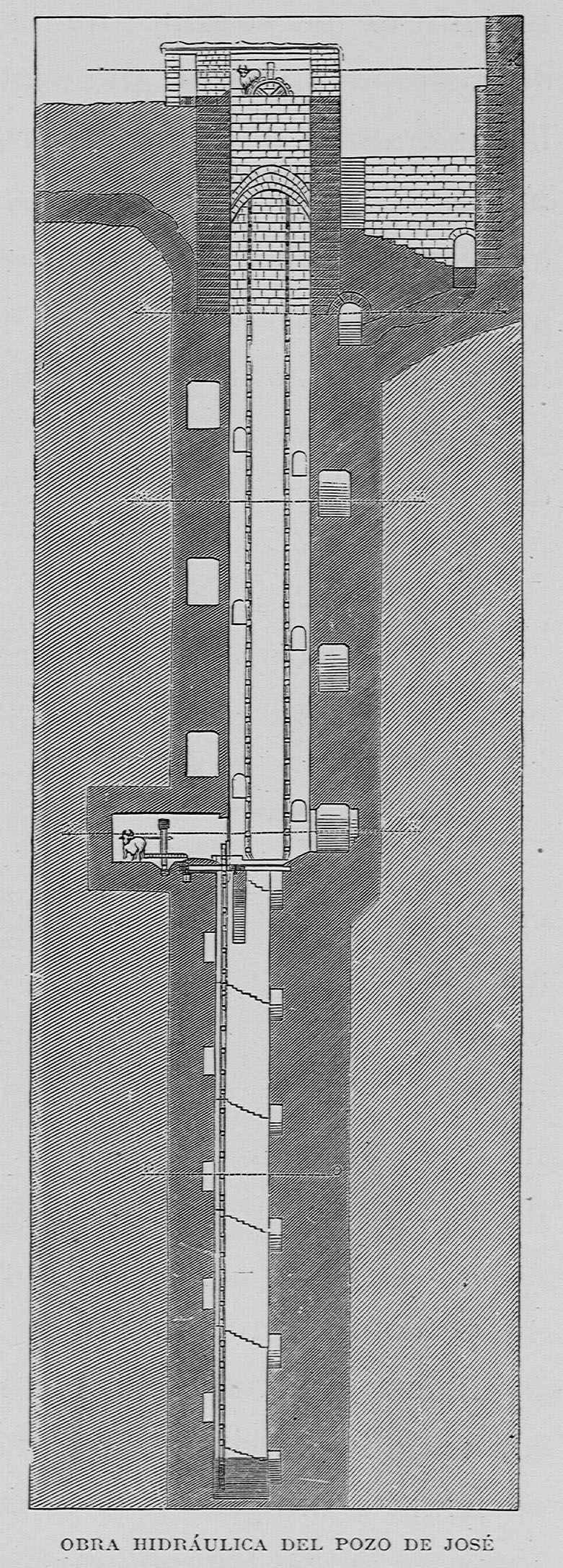
Cross-section of Saladin's well

=== Yusuf's Well (Salah ad-Din's Well) ===
To supply water to the Citadel, Saladin built an 85-metre-deep (280 ft) well known as the Well of Joseph (or Bir Yusuf), so-called because Saladin's birth name, Yūsif, is the Arabic equivalent of Joseph. His chief eunuch and confidant, Qaraqush, who oversaw construction of the Citadel, was also responsible for digging the well. The well is considered a masterpiece of medieval engineering and still exists today. Its shaft was divided into two sections, almost all of which is cut out of the rock itself. The upper part has a wider shaft which is surrounded by a long spiral staircase, separated from the main shaft only by a thin wall of rock. For this reason, the well is also known as the Spiral Well (Bir al-Halazon). The stairs could be covered with earth to make it into a ramp for oxen to travel down to its bottom. The lower part of the well was another shaft descending to the level of underground water seeping in from the Nile. At the bottom of the upper section, two oxen turned a waterwheel that brought the water up from the bottom of the well, while another waterwheel at the top of the well, also powered by oxen, brought the water up the rest of the way.

=== The Mamluk Aqueduct ===
During the reign of al-Nasir Muhammad, Saladin's well was insufficient to produce enough water for the Citadel's growing population and for al-Nasir's envisioned construction projects. To increase the volume of water, al-Nasir renovated an Ayyubid aqueduct system (probably originally completed by al-Kamil) and extended it with a new aqueduct system. This system consisted of a number of water wheels on the Nile which raised water to the top of an hexagonal tower (built by his predecessor al-Ashraf Khalil), from which the water was then transported along a series of raised aqueducts to the base of the Citadel. From the foot of the Citadel, the water was then carried up to the palaces via another system of waterwheels. However, since this water supply could not be guaranteed in the event of a siege, Saladin's well was still an essential water source.

=== The Cistern of Ya'qub Shah al-Mihmandar ===
This small domed building just outside the Citadel to the east was built in 1495–96 by an amir called Ya'qub Shah al-Mihmandar, a man originally from Erzincan (Turkey) who joined the Mamluk ranks under Sultan Qaytbay. Because of its dome, the building has the look of a mausoleum but it is actually a structure covering access to a cistern. It has an inscription that memorializes the victory of Sultan Qaytbay's army over Ottoman forces at Adana in a battle in 1486. Today it is cut off from the Citadel and stands stranded between two highways (Salah Salem road and Kobri al-Ebageah) which pass right next to the Citadel on its eastern side.

== Mosques ==
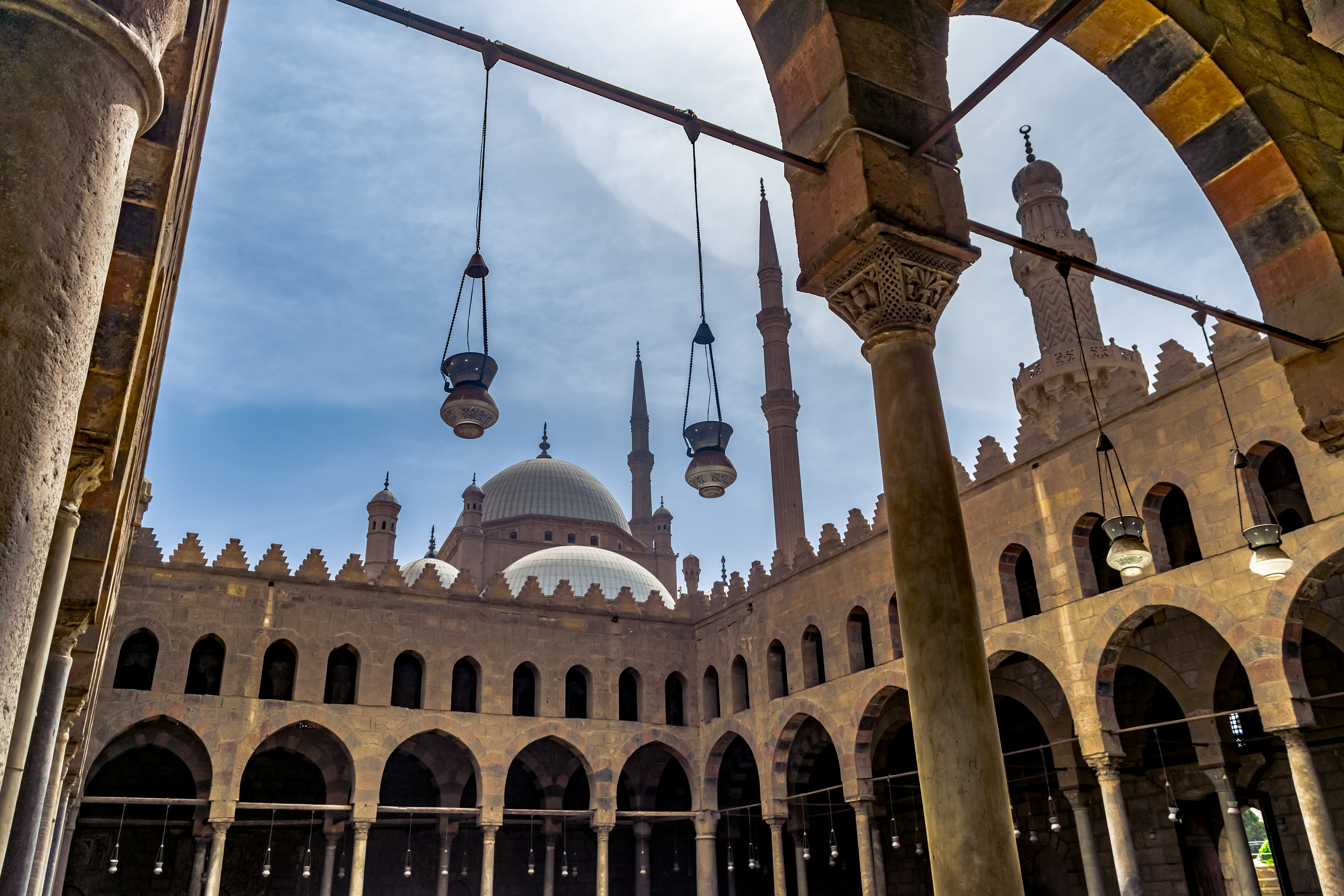
Courtyard of the Al-Nasir Muhammad Mosque. The domes and minarets of the Mosque of Muhammad Ali are visible in the background.

There are four main mosques in the Citadel today, some of which are open to visitors:

=== Mosque of Muhammad Ali ===
The mosque was built between 1830 and 1848, although not completed until the reign of Said Pasha in 1857. It is located in the Southern Enclosure and is open to the public today. The architect was Yusuf Bushnak from Istanbul and its model was the Sultan Ahmed Mosque in that city. Muhammad Ali Pasha was buried in a tomb carved from Carrara marble, in the courtyard of the mosque. His body was transferred here from Hawsh al-Basha in 1857.

=== Al-Nasir Muhammad Mosque ===
Built in 1318, during the early Bahri Mamluk period, as the royal mosque of the Citadel where the sultans of Cairo performed their Friday prayers, today this hypostyle mosque is still similar to how it looked in the 1300s though many repairs have been made and only some of its original decoration has been restored. The parts of the building relying on plastered walls have been reinforced. There have also been attempts to restore the light-blue color of the ceiling. It is located in the Southern Enclosure and is open to the public.

=== Mosque of Sulayman Pasha ===
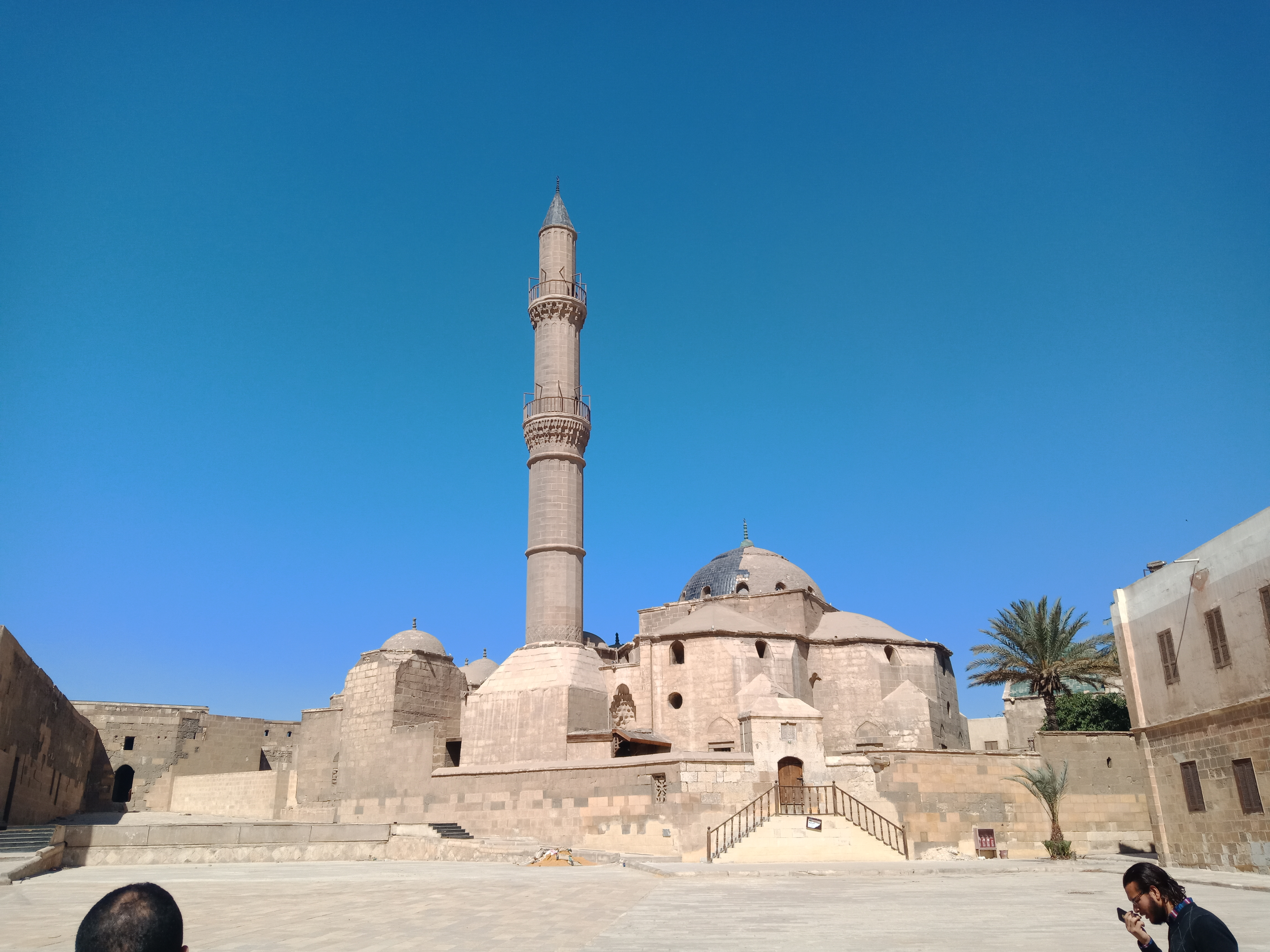
Sulayman Pasha Mosque (16th century)

Built in 1528, it was first of the Citadel's Ottoman-style mosques and is one of the few structures in Cairo closely resembling the "classical" Ottoman style of the 16th century. It is located in the Northern Enclosure, just northeast of the Harim Palace (Military Museum). It was built on the ruins of the earlier Mosque of Sidi Sariyya built by Abu-Mansur Qasta, an amir in the Fatimid era (predating the Citadel). Qasta's tomb, dated to 1140 CE, still exists in the mosque today.

=== Mosque of al-'Azab ===
This lesser-known mosque is situated right behind the main western gate, Bab al-'Azab. Both are named after the Ottoman military regiments known as 'Azaban (or Azaps) who were housed in this part of the Citadel during the Ottoman period. The mosque was built by the Mamluk amir Ahmad Katkhuda in 1697, but it has been argued that it incorporates, or was a renovation of, an earlier Mamluk mosque or religious structure. Although not publicly accessible, it can be spotted by its pointed Ottoman-style minaret.

== Museums ==
The Citadel also contains several museums:

=== Egyptian Military museum ===
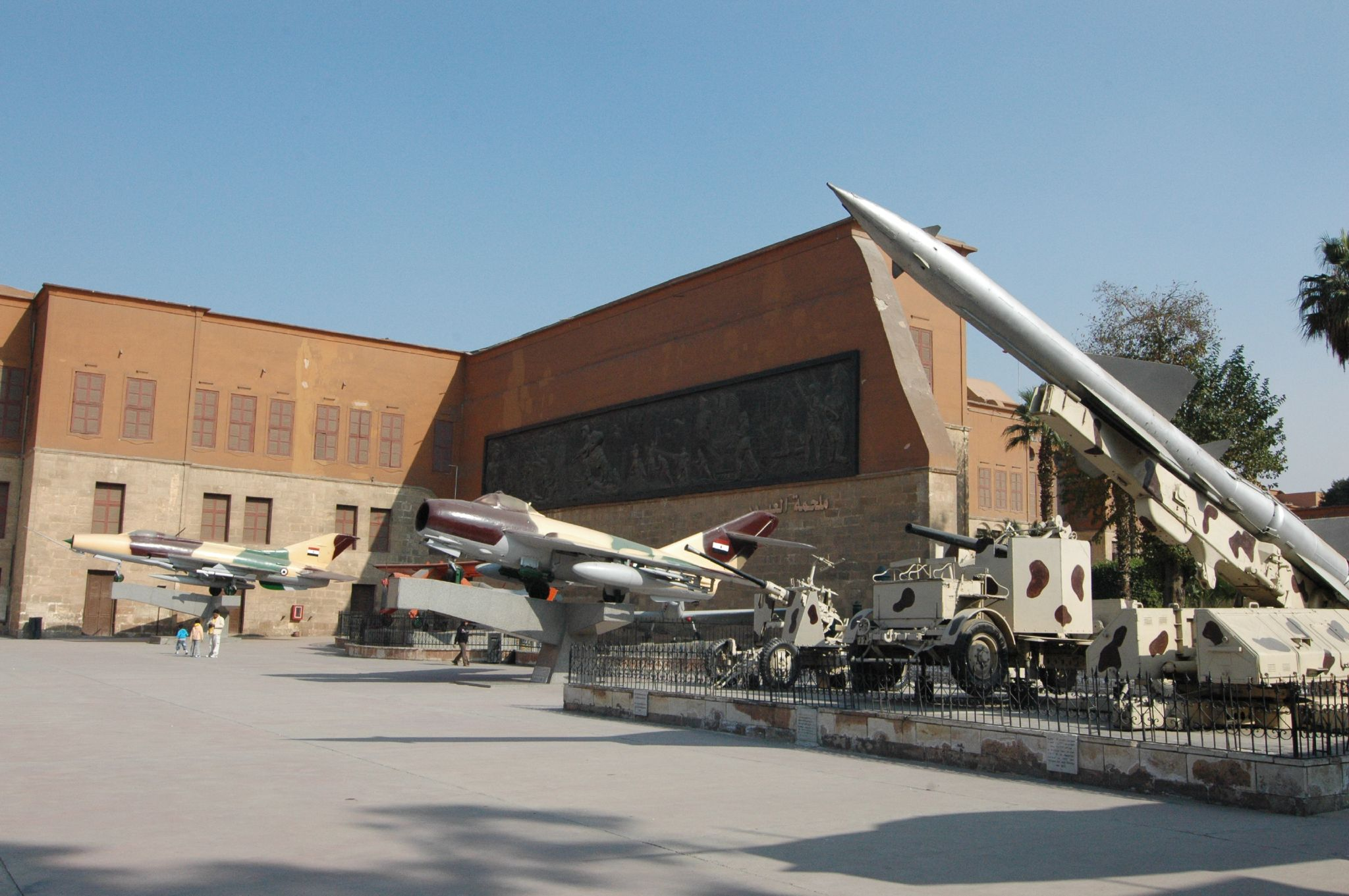
Egyptian National Military Museum

It is the official museum of the Egyptian Army. The museum was established in 1937 at the old building of the Egyptian Ministry of War in downtown Cairo. It was later moved to a temporary location in the Garden City district of Cairo. In November 1949 the museum was moved to the Harem Palace at the Cairo citadel. It has been renovated several times since, in 1982 and 1993.

=== Al-Gawhara Palace Museum ===
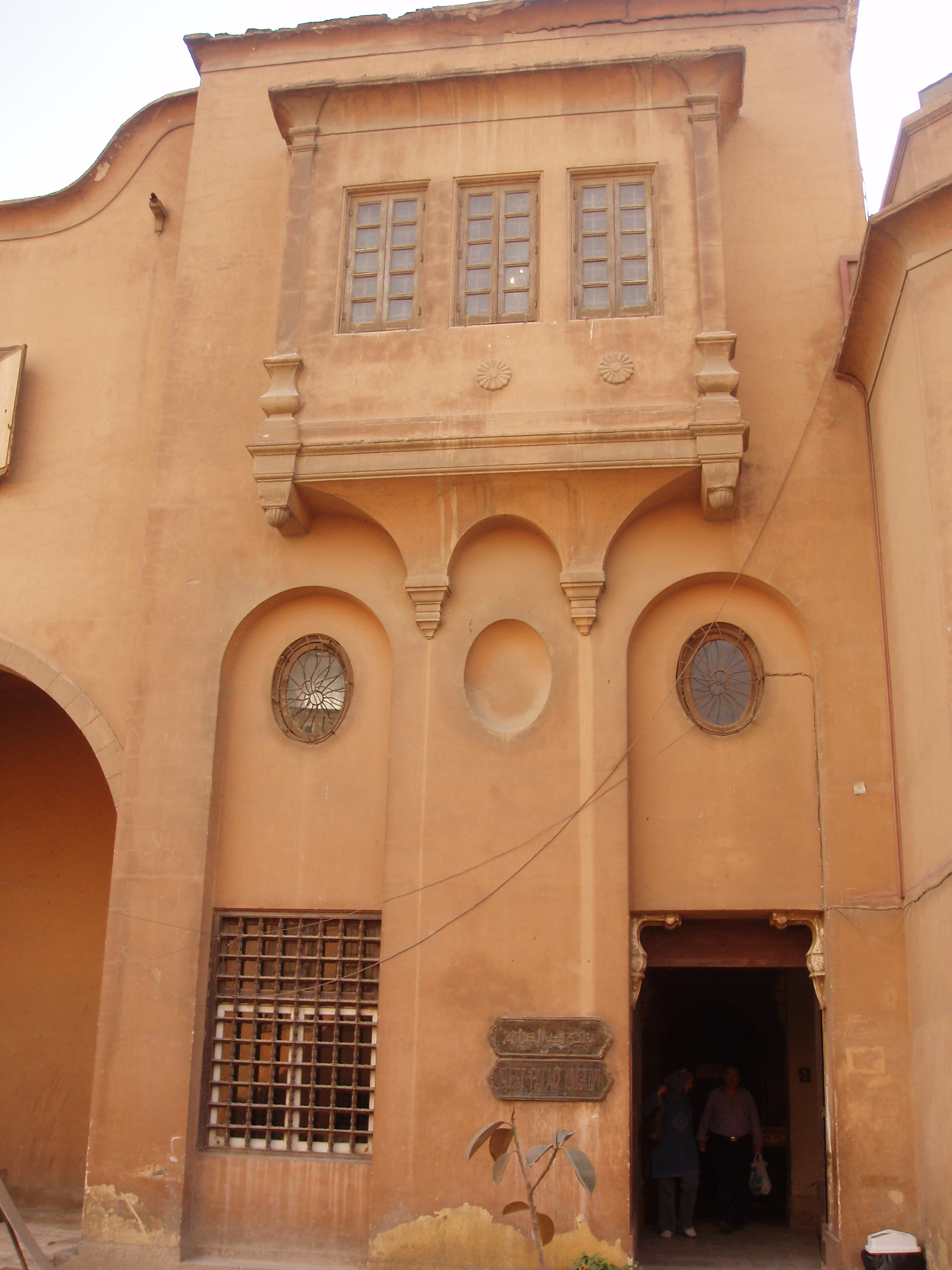
Exterior of the al-Gawhara Palace

Also known as Bijou Palace, is a palace and museum commissioned by Muhammad Ali Pasha in 1814. The palace was designed and constructed by artisans contracted from a variety of countries, including Greeks, Turks, Bulgarians and Albanians. Muhammad Ali's official divan or audience hall, where the pasha received guests, contains a 1,000 kg chandelier sent to him by Louis Philippe I of France. The palace also contains the throne of Muhammad Ali Pasha that was a gift from the King of Italy.

=== Carriage Museum ===
Inaugurated in 1983, it houses a collection of unique Royal Carriages attributed to different historical periods, from the reign of Khedive Ismail until the reign of King Farouk, in addition to other collection of unique antiques related to the carriages.

=== Police Museum ===
The museum (also sometimes referred to as the Prison Museum) is just north of the gate known as Bab al-'Alam, on a terrace commanding sweeping views of the city below. It is housed in the Citadel's former prison and contains exhibits on topics such as famous political assassinations and displays of the murder weapon used.
