= Justin-Pascal Angelin =

French surgeon (born 1795)

Justin-Pascal Angelin (born 17 May 1795) was a French Naval surgeon born in Marseille.

== Accomplishments ==
He was aboard the barge Louqsor, which was set to bring the Luxor Obelisk to the Place de la Concorde in Paris. While stationed in Egypt, Angelin observed a lethal cholera epidemic that claimed the lives of 150,000 of the country's 3.5 million residents in a matter of two months. In 1833, he published Expédition du Louxor ou relation de la campagne faite dans la Thébaide pour en rapporter l'obélisque occidental de Thèbes about his experiences on the mission, and the following year he pursued his doctorate in medicine at the University of Paris, where he wrote his thesis about the cholera outbreak that had occurred in Luxor. In 1838, Angelin authored another piece entitled Mémoire sur l'épidémie de fièvre jaune qui a régné en 1838 à la Guadeloupe, et particulièrement à la Pointe-à-Pitre.
