= Cairo Citadel Clock =

Clock tower in Cairo, Egypt

Coordinates: 30°01′46″N 31°15′34″E

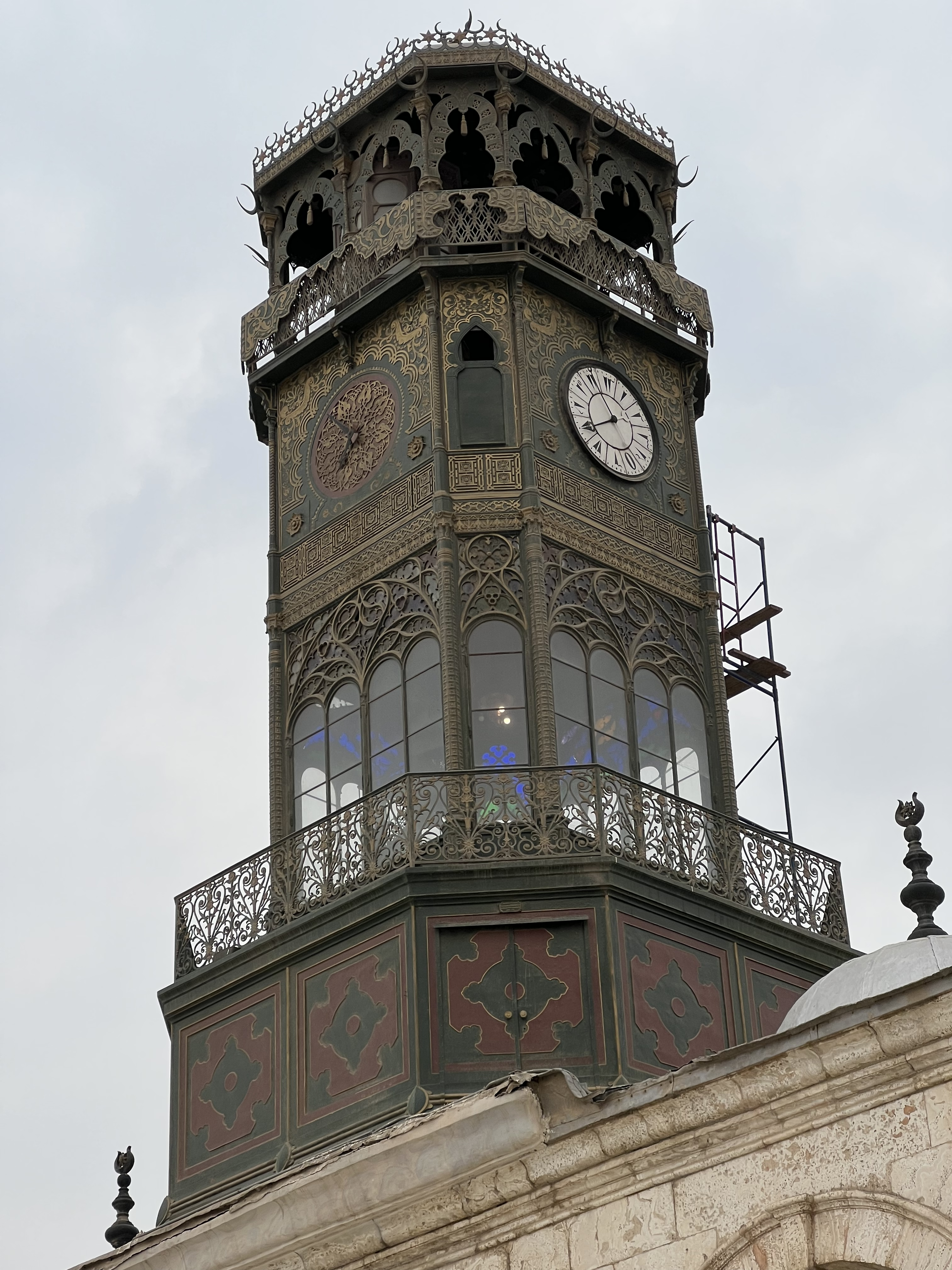
Clock tower of Muhammad Ali Mosque

The Cairo Citadel Clock is a 19th century French clock tower situated at the Cairo Citadel, and Egypt's first public ticking clock.

For many decades, the clock was famous for not working. Various attempts were made to fix the clock in the 20th century; a repair was ordered by King Farouk in 1943 and in 1984 under President Hosni Mubarak, but both times the clock stopped working a few days later. In November and December 2020, French horologist Francois Simon-Fustier travelled to Cairo to examine the clock, and sent a report to the Egyptian Ministry of Tourism and Antiquities. The reparation of the clock was carried out by an Egyptian expert from Luxor. On 16 September 2021, the Egyptian Ministry of Tourism and Antiquities announced the completion of the restoration and restarting of the clock:

...the clock has been repaired by Egyptian craftsmen after years of nonoperation. The trials of the clock’s automatic winding [mechanism] have begun in order to ensure its continuous, uninterrupted operation. The restoration of the clock tower has been completed, and the colors have been enhanced to give it back its original luster. Maintenance and reinstallation of the stained glass panels and the rims of the circular iron columns located on the upper part of the column were also completed.

According to Osama Talaat, the clock had needed to be wound twice a day, but following the restoration now has a mechanism for "automatic winding of the clock without human assistance.”

The clock has been widely cited as having been sent by France in return for the Luxor obelisk now at the Place de la Concorde, however this has been disputed. Secretary General of the Supreme Council of Antiquities Mostafa Waziri said that the obelisk "… has nothing to do with the [clock] that [Louis Philippe] gave to Mohammad Ali. What proves this is that in 1845 the clock arrived to Mohammad Ali, and when it did, the construction of the Mohammad Ali Mosque in the citadel had not yet been completed, so the clock was placed in the Mohammad Ali Palace in Shubra. During the reign of Said Pasha, the tower was made until the clock was placed in the Mohammad Ali Mosque in 1855 AD."

== Original placement ==
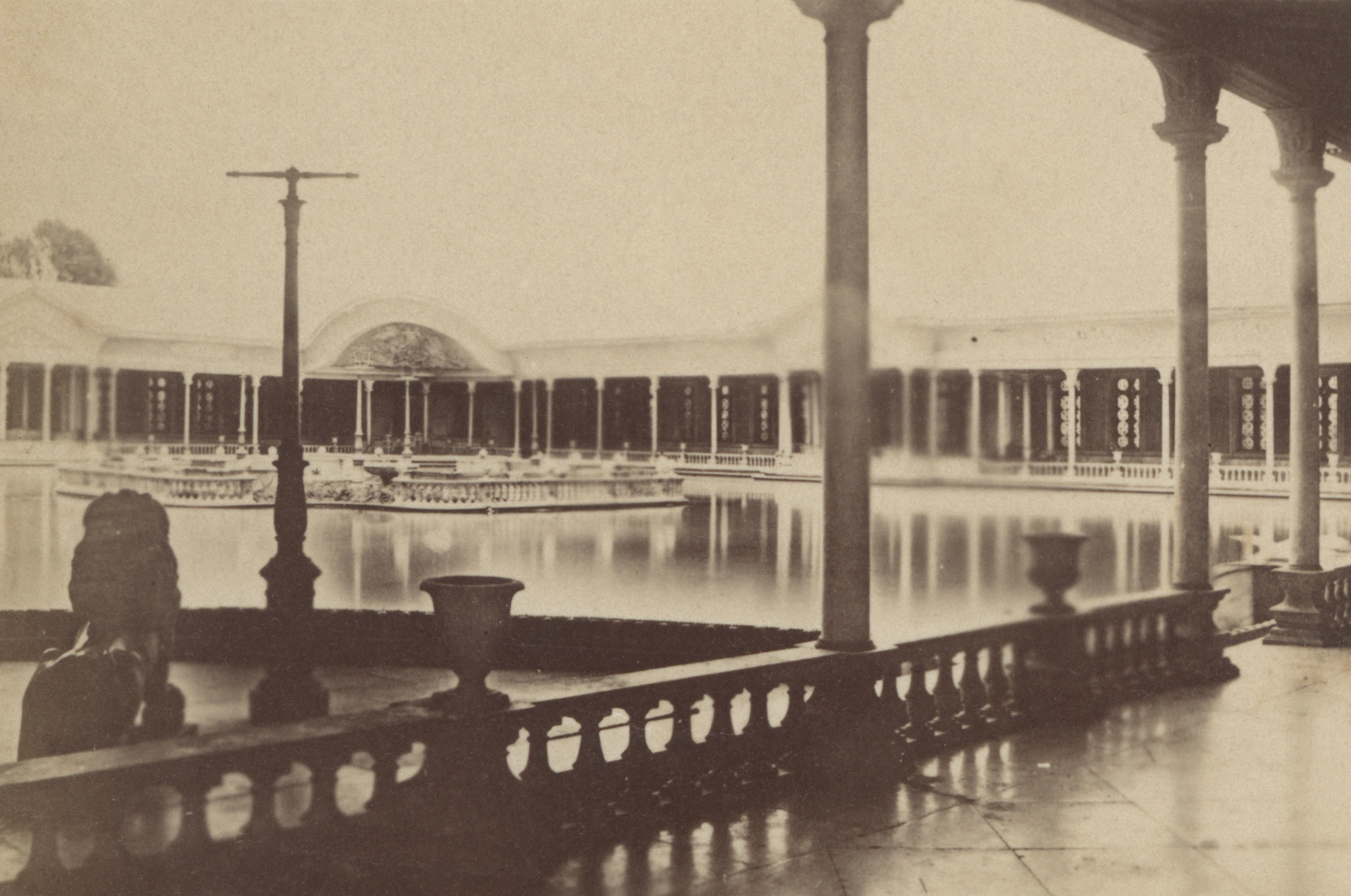
The Palace of Shubra

The clock was manufactured in France, and sent to Egypt in 1846 as a gift from the King Louis Philippe I of France to Muhammad Ali of Egypt. It was intended to be placed inside Muhammad Ali's Shubra Palace, but it was not installed and was left in the palace in storage.

== Installation at the Citadel ==
The clock was installed at the Citadel in 1856 under Abbas I of Egypt, following the construction of the Mosque of Muhammad Ali which had been completed in 1848. The clock was housed inside a locally made metal tower, which was decorated with Arabic inscriptions and stained glass.

== Gallery ==
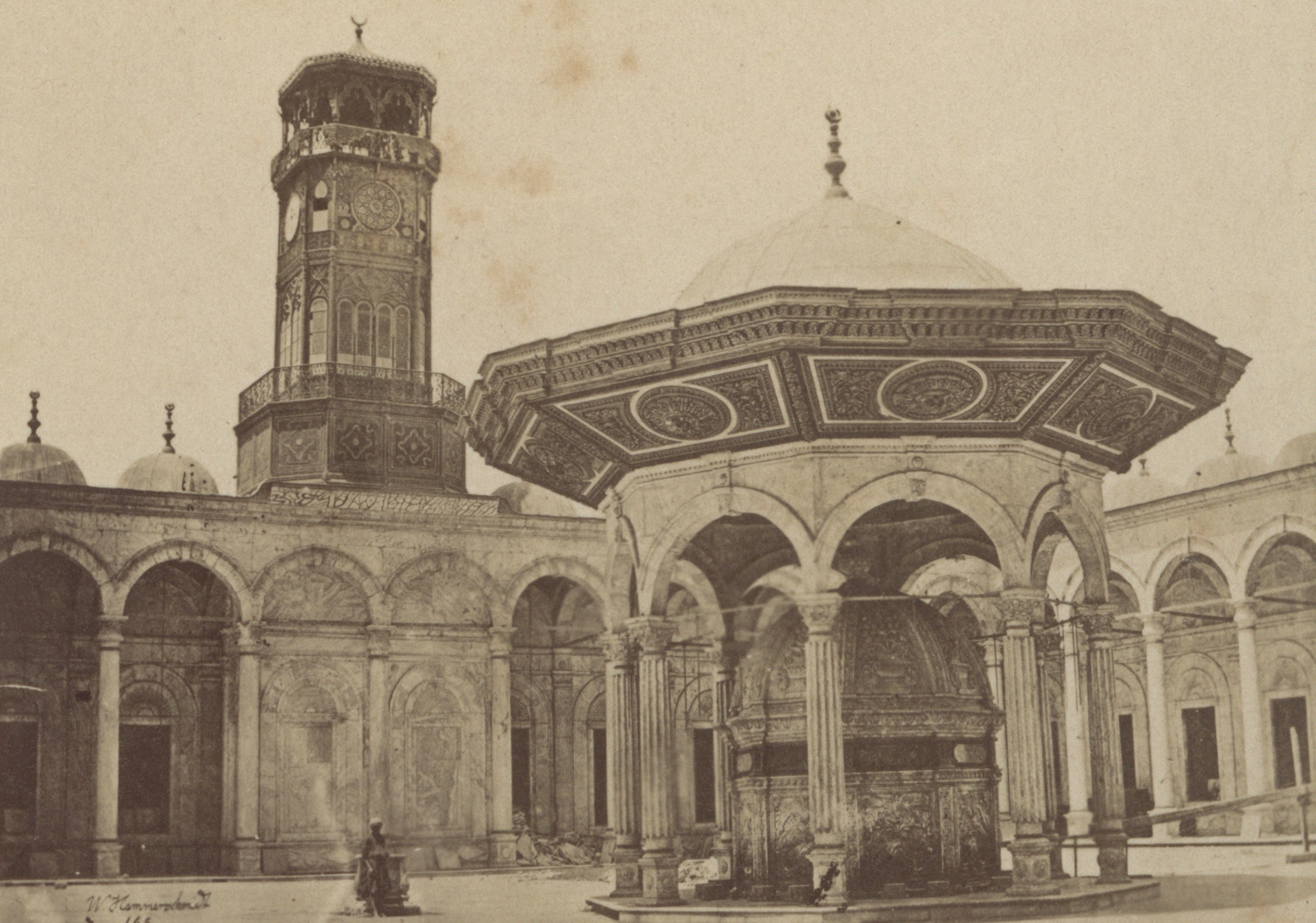

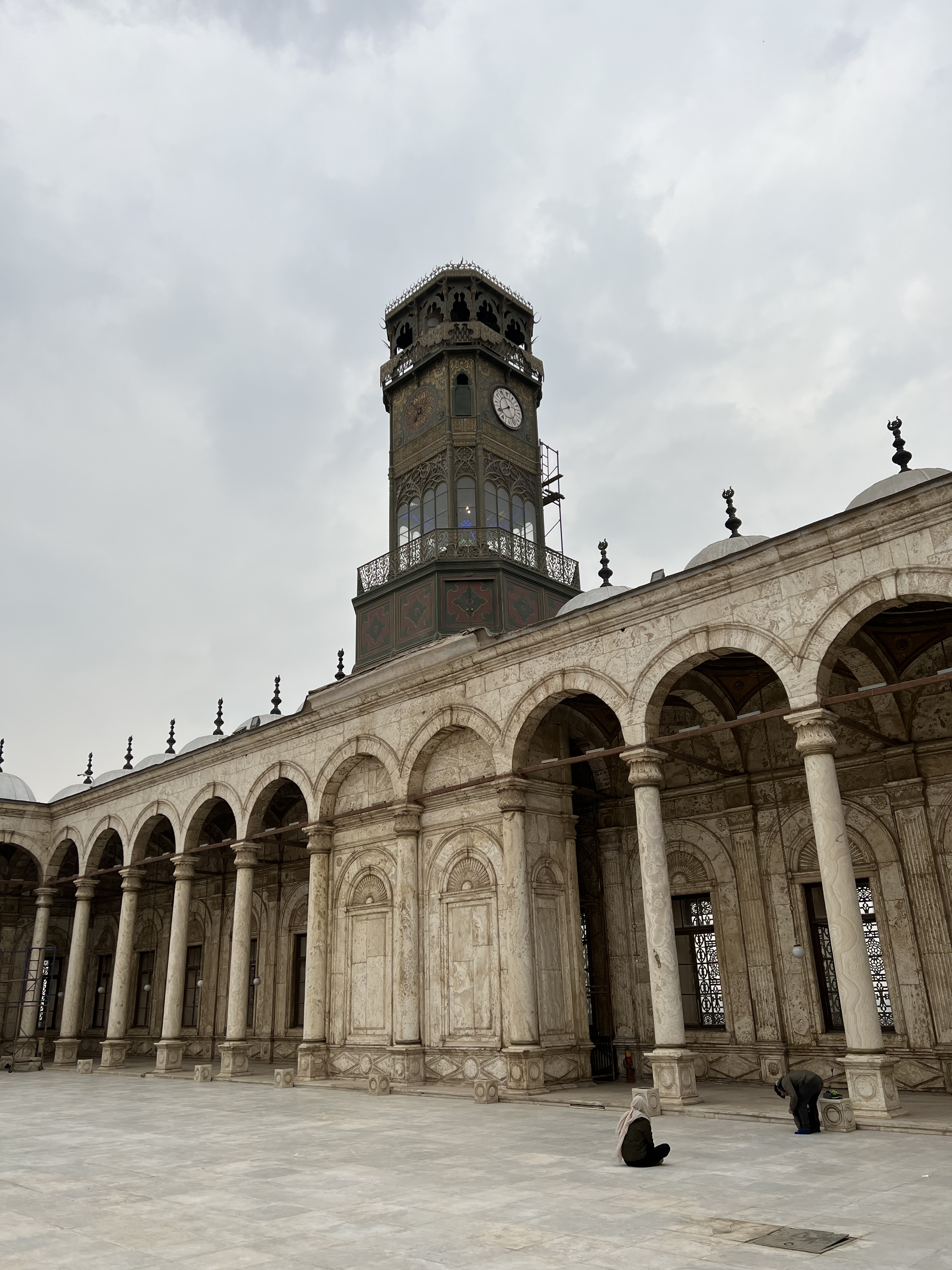

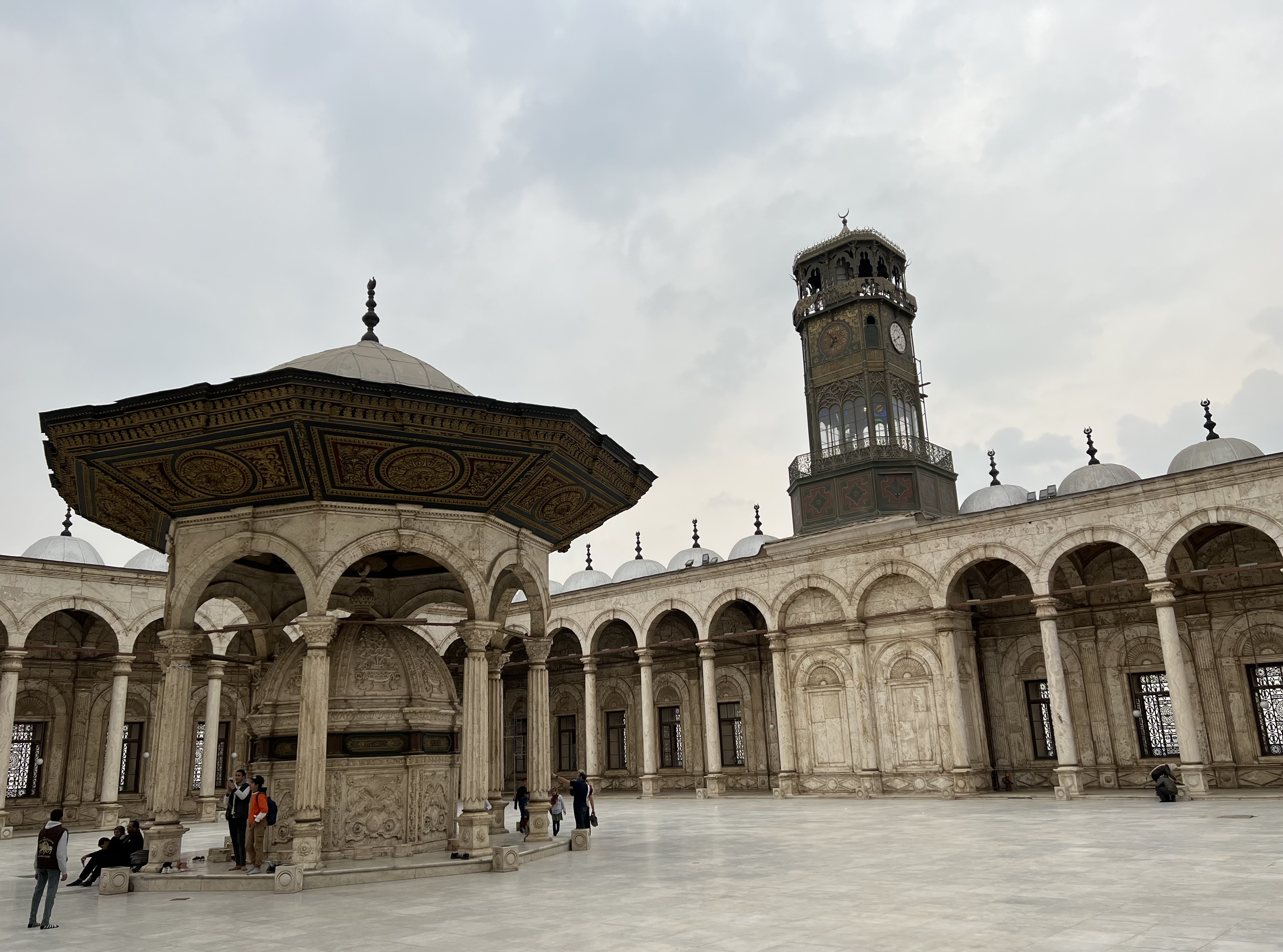

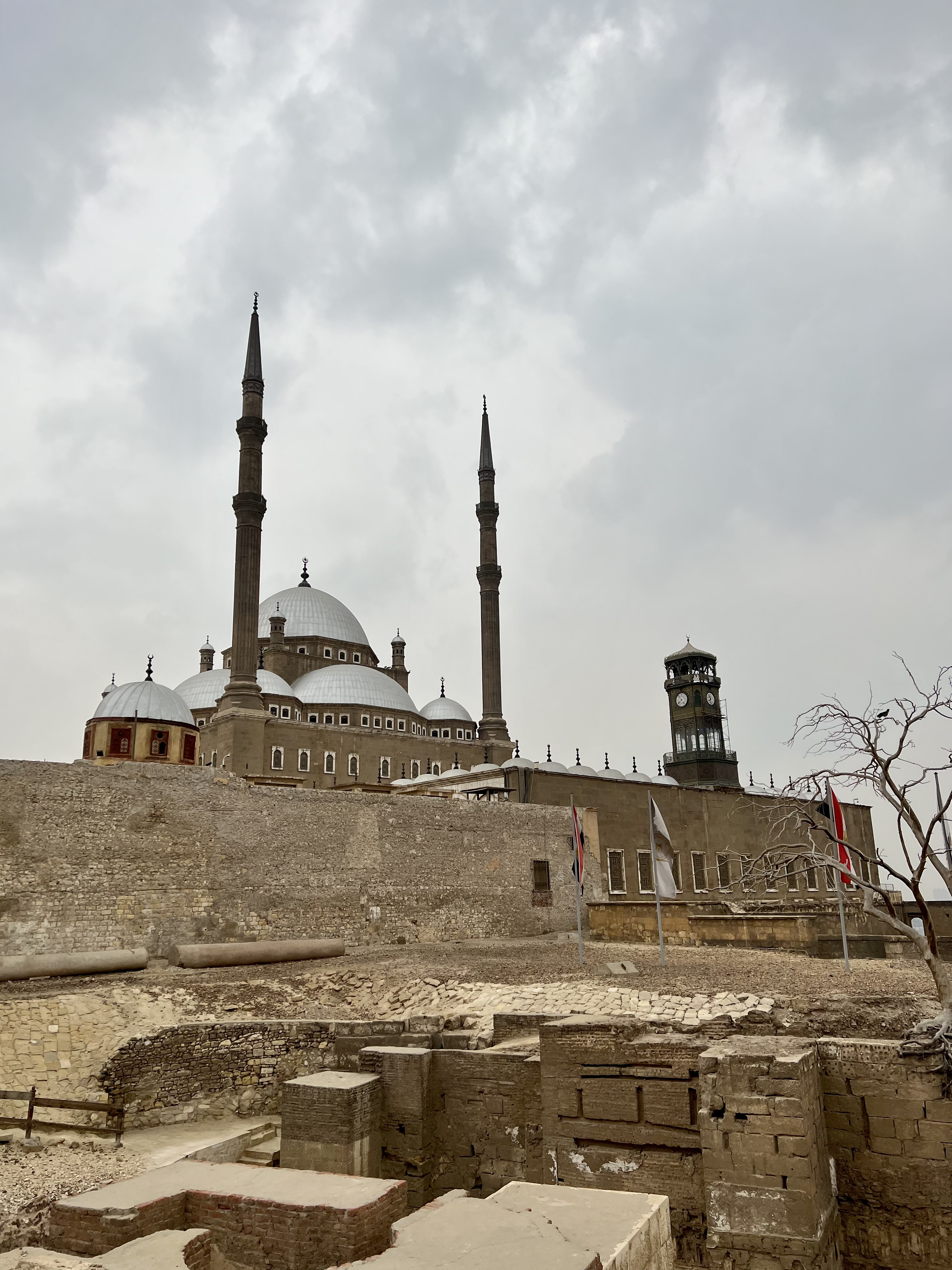

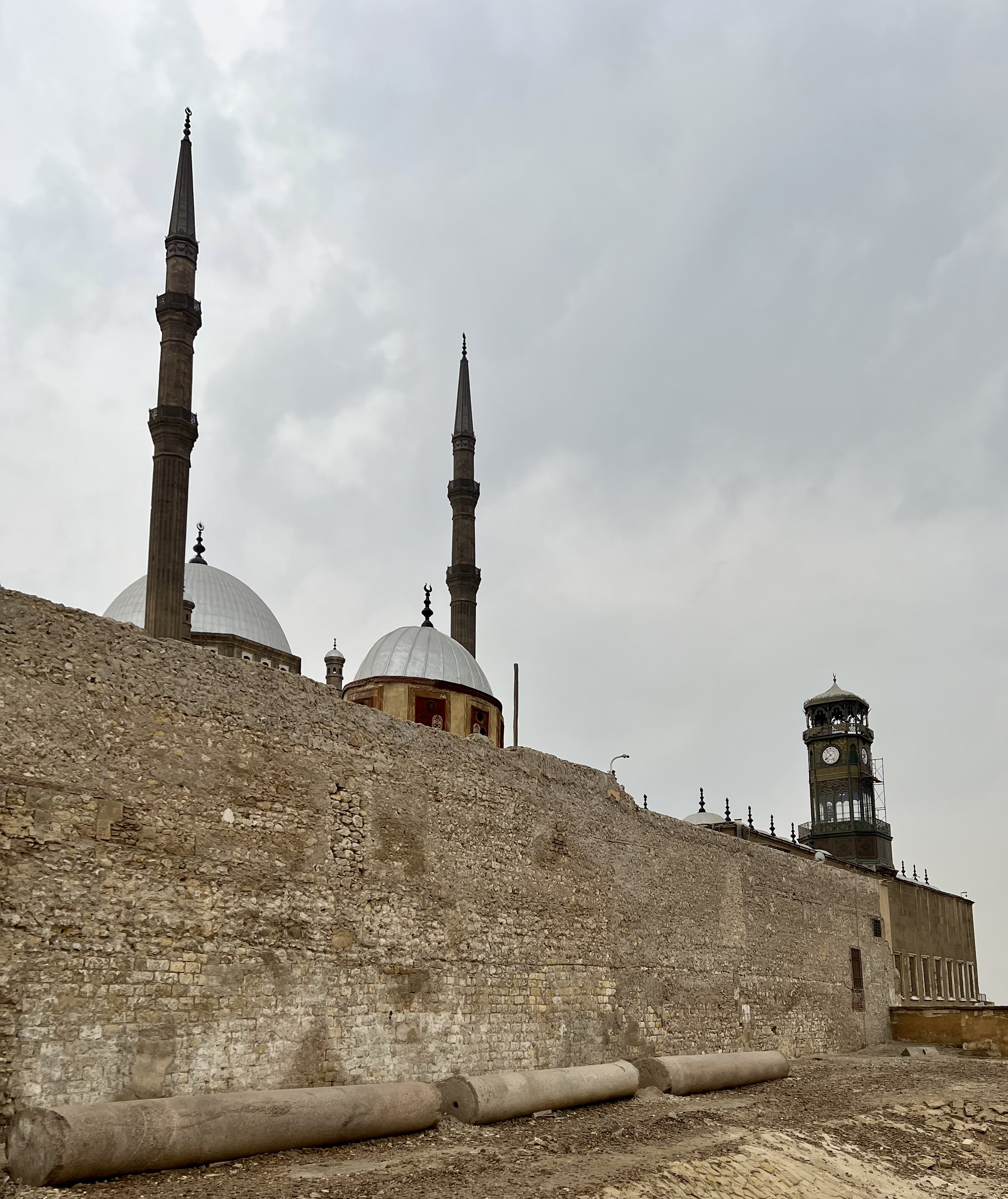

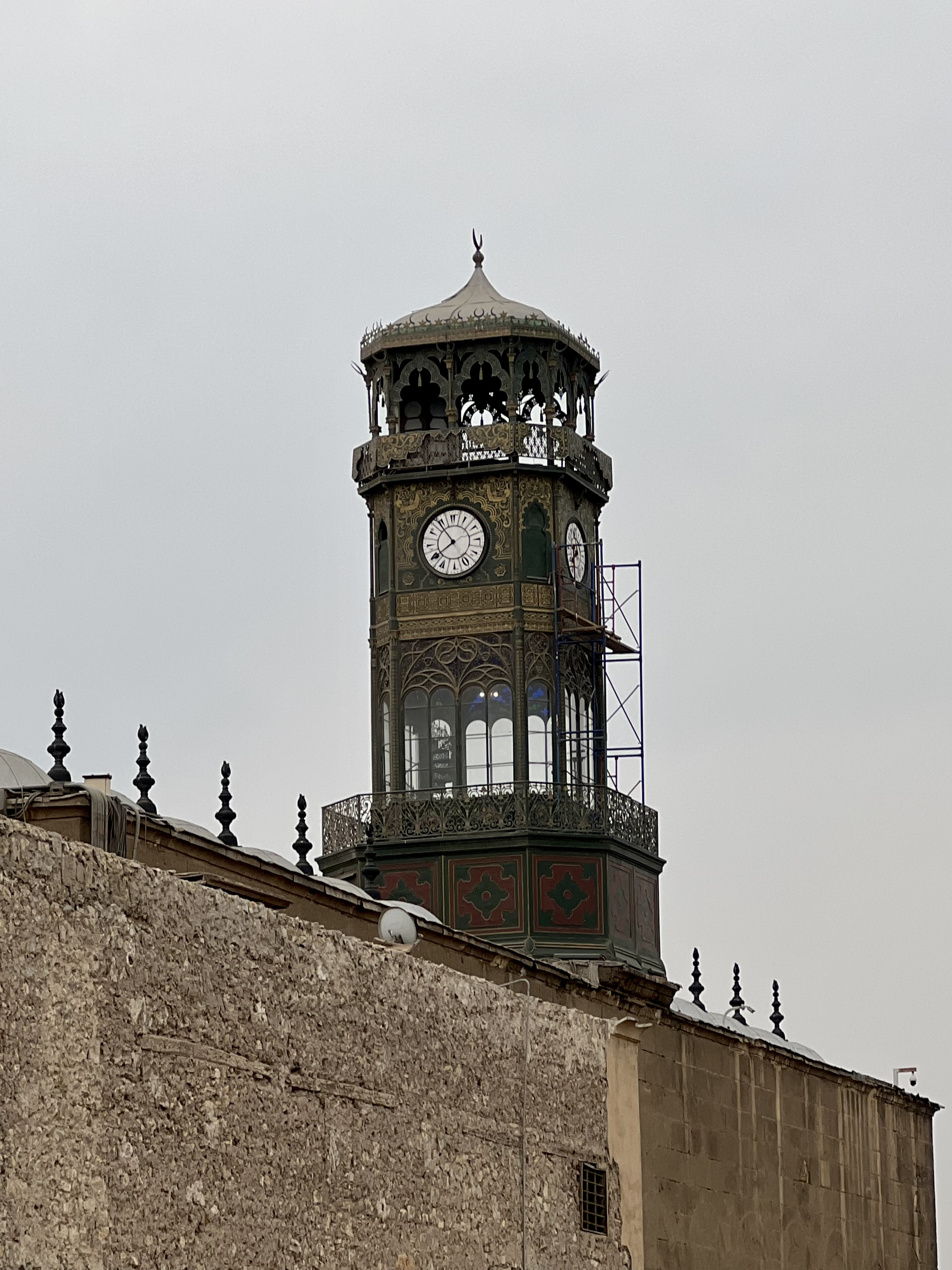
