= Milène Guermont =

French sculptor

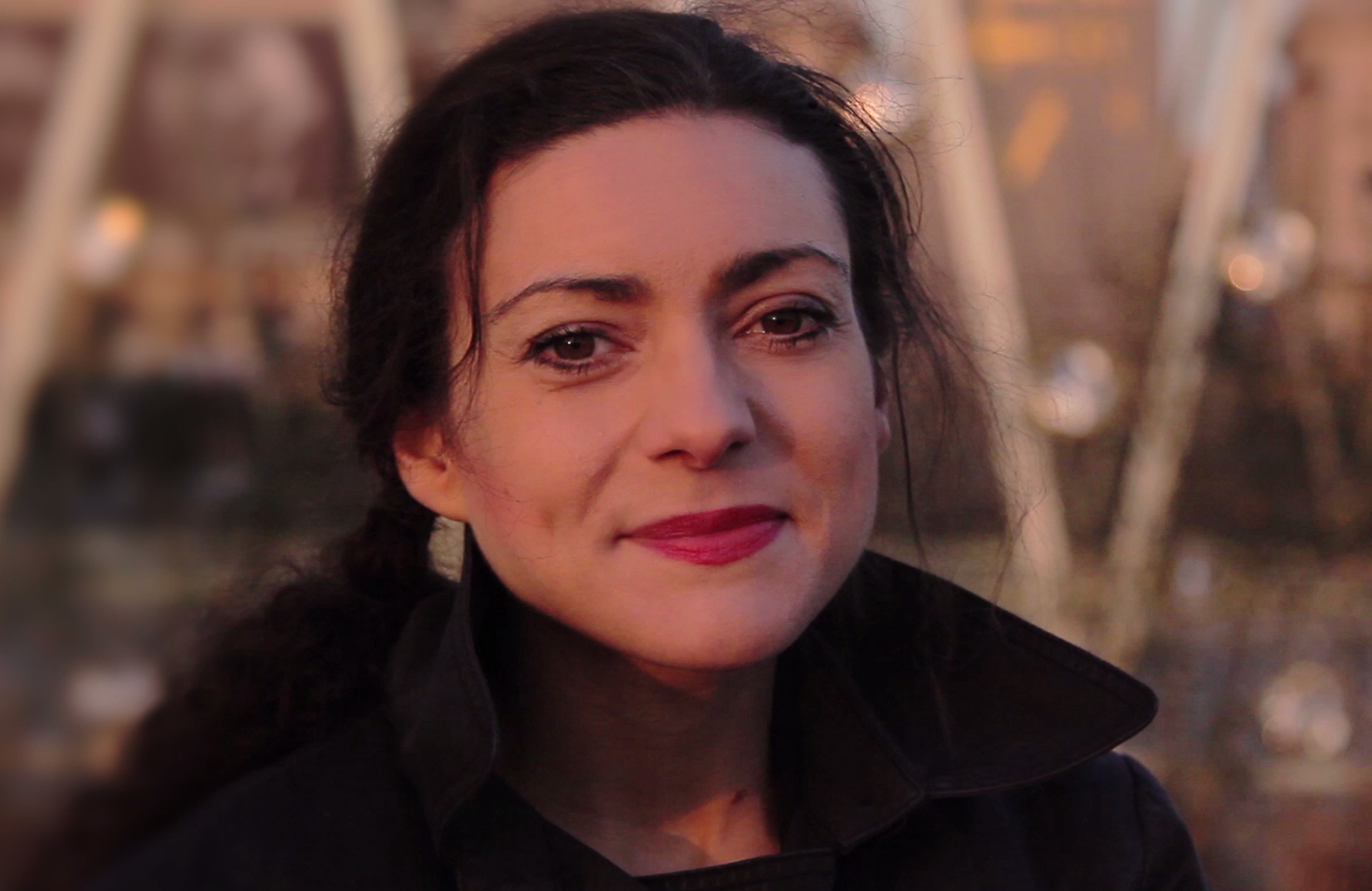
- Milène Guermont in front of PHARES, Place de la Concorde
- Born: 1981 (age 44–45); Normandy, France
- Known for: monumental interactive sculptures, polysensual concrete
- Notable work: PHARES, INSTANTS, CAUSSE
- Website: http://www.mileneguermont.com

Milène Guermont (born 1981) is a French artist, inventor, and engineer. Her public artworks include the INSTANTS monument, at Utah Beach, which commemorates the 70th anniversary of the Second World War; the CAUSSE tomb at Montparnasse Cemetery; and the PHARES sculpture next to the Concorde Obelisk in Paris.

== Early life and education ==
Guermont was born and raised in rural Normandy. She completed her secondary education at Lycée Robert de Mortain, where she obtained a scientific baccalauréat.

She later enrolled in scientific preparatory classes (Mathématiques supérieures and Mathématiques spéciales). She completed these preparatory studies in mathematics and physics at Lycée Malherbe in Caen.

In 2001, Guermont sat for the national competitive entrance examinations for engineering schools and also applied to the engineering school INSA Strasbourg, despite not having followed a specialized preparatory program in architecture. After qualifying with a written examination, she completed an oral examination that included commentary on an image of Fallingwater by Frank Lloyd Wright. She was ranked among the admitted candidates and entered the school in Strasbourg.

She subsequently enrolled at the generalist engineering school ENSIACET in Toulouse while also attending courses in artistic expression. In 2003, she was invited to be a guest researcher at the engineering department at Brown University, in the United States, where she researched carbon nanotubes.

In 2004, she entered ENSMN in Nancy and simultaneously attended art courses at the École des beaux-arts de Nancy as part of the ARTEM program. During this period, she developed an interest in industrial design, notably through the study of stair designs by Roger Tallon. Following exchanges with Tallon, she decided to apply to the École nationale supérieure des arts décoratifs, where Tallon had established the first formal design course in France.

Guermont successfully passed the competitive entrance examination to the school and was admitted directly into the third year of study.

== Career ==
Milène Guermont has diplomas in art and engineering. To materialize her ideas, she has made several innovations, some patented.

Guermont created "Polysensual Concrete" to make sculptures that interact (with sound, light, vibration) when you touch them.

In 2008, her first solo exhibition, Concrete Landscapes, was held at the town hall of the 8th arrondissement of Paris. In the same year, she produced First Step on a bridge designed by Rudy Ricciotti in Saint-Guilhem-le-Désert, using her patented Colored Engraving technique. Also in 2008, she created Mon Amour for Art Basel Miami Beach, which was presented by Galerie Bertin-Toublanc. The installation consisted of one thousand concrete blocks and three elements made from her Polysensual Concrete material.

In 2009, her work was exhibited at the New Art Center in New York City and at the Art Center in Salt Lake City.

In 2011, she completed her first sculpture integrated into architecture, M.D.R., for Sainte-Marie de Neuilly. The work combined three techniques: Cratered Concrete, Colored Engraving on Concrete, and Polysensual Concrete.

Her exhibition titled SENSITIVE MEMORIES took place in 2012 at the National Archives of France, it was the first time that contemporary artworks had occupied different rooms of the Hôtel de Soubise.

Guermont continued her work on the experience of touch at a larger scale. She created public artworks weighing from a few grams to several tons that respond to their environments, such as INSTANTS (installed since June 2014 on Utah Beach) on the Atlantic Wall; PHARES, was imagined as a dialogue with the Luxor Obelisk (installed from October 2015 until April 2016 on Place de la Concorde, Paris); or A BEAT on the Eiffel Tower in February 2016.

In July 2016, her artwork CAUSSE, commissioned by an eminent scientist, was installed permanently in the preservation area of the Montparnasse Cemetery in Paris. This sculpture was made of high-performance concrete and involved light.

She collaborates with people from different fields. For example, she created her THE PEARL OF LAOS with the architect Claude Parent; it was shown at Fondation Cartier. The theater director Jean Lambert-Wild conceived a play with some of her artworks.

In 2016, she had a solo show called LES CRISTAUX at Mines Paris – PSL.

In 2017, Milène was selected to represent French engineers at the World Federation of Engineering Organizations (WFEO), UNESCO's partner. Her sculpture made of Polysensual Concrete, MINI AGUA, was the artwork shown at the French Pavilion of the International Exhibition ASTANA 2017.

She received in Brussels the art prize of NOVA XX, international competition of women artists who use hi-tech.

In 2018, she had solo shows at Trinity House, Westminster, Jérome Seydoux-Pathé Foundation, the town hall of the 13th arrondissement of Paris, UNESCO. PYRAMIDION was exhibited on a boat next to the Musée d'Orsay during Nuit Blanche, Paris. It was the only sculpture at Lieu Secret for the Badass festival, with Lou Doillon, Agnes Jaoui, and Manon Garcia. PYRAMIDION interacts with the public and the WALKING MAN by Giacometti at UNESCO, in particular for the First International Day of Light and La Nuit des Musées. Her pyramid belonged to the "2018, European Year of Cultural Heritage", The International Day of Women Days in Engineering, the London Festival of Architecture, and the Open Houses of the capital of the UK. Soprano Katerina Mina performed a cappella in PYRAMIDION TWIN at Trinity House, London.

Milene was one of the three "Entrepreneurial Women of the Year" of Usine Nouvelle, one of the eight speakers on "Women's Achievements and Professional Attainments" at the international symposium MoMoWo in Turin, and became an honorary fellow of Queen Mary University in London.

In 2019, she took part in the French delegation to the Global Summit of Women that occurred in Basel and received the Peace Hero Award.

In 2020, she became an Eisenhower Fellow in a worldwide competition that identified 25 women leaders. She received the Marcia & Hap Wagner Award in honor of the American engineer and philanthropist.

In 2020, 80 companies of French Excellence were federated to create a habitable total artwork in the neighborhood of New Athens in Paris. It questioned the notion of immersive arts. She created the concept of an alphabet made of "art-objects" that can be expanded beyond the walls of the site in Paris.

In 2021, her monument-artwork, made of ultra-high-performance fiber-reinforced concrete, BALANCE was installed at Père Lachaise Cemetery next to the sculpture of Balzac. She also received the Projects Woman of the Year trophy of Trophées des Femmes de l'Industrie, the Hap & Maria Wagner Award from Robert Gates in Philadelphia, and the "Monograph Collection" art grant from ADAGP. One of her PLANETS was exhibited at the Fine Arts Museum of Laval. Her first textile sculptures were exhibited in the inhabitable total artwork by Gio Ponti in dialogue with some furniture by Piero Fornasetti and drawings by Camille Henrot.

In 2022, she had an artistic residency at The Invisible Dog Art Center in Brooklyn and gave her first lecture at an Ivy League school, Columbia University.

In 2023, Milène had a solo show at the Villa du Temps Retrouvé museum; in particular her MADELEINE FONDANTE dialogues with a sculpture by Auguste Rodin. She exhibited at the show JOY curated by Paul Ardenne at the Guillaume Gallery in Paris. She also received a grant from ADAGP in partnership with ARTE Studio for a video portrait.

In 2024, by decree of the President of France, at the instigation of the prime minister, Guermont was made a Knight of the National Order of Merit. She was distinguished as one of the 100 French-speaking women of culture of the year ("100 Femmes de Culture"), with Katherine Elizabeth Fleming and Charlotte Gainsbourg.

== Representation / Jury ==
Since 2017, Guermont has represented women engineers and French engineers and scientists (IESF) at international institutions such as WFEO.

Guermont is a member of numerous juries, such as that granting the diploma of l'École spéciale d'architecture, the artistic competition "Art et Sciences" at the Sorbonne, Ecoles d'Art Américaines de Fontainebleau, LVMH, and the World Architecture Festival.
