= Luxor Obelisks =

Pair of Egyptian obelisks, one of which is now in Paris

Coordinates: 48°51′56″N 2°19′16″E

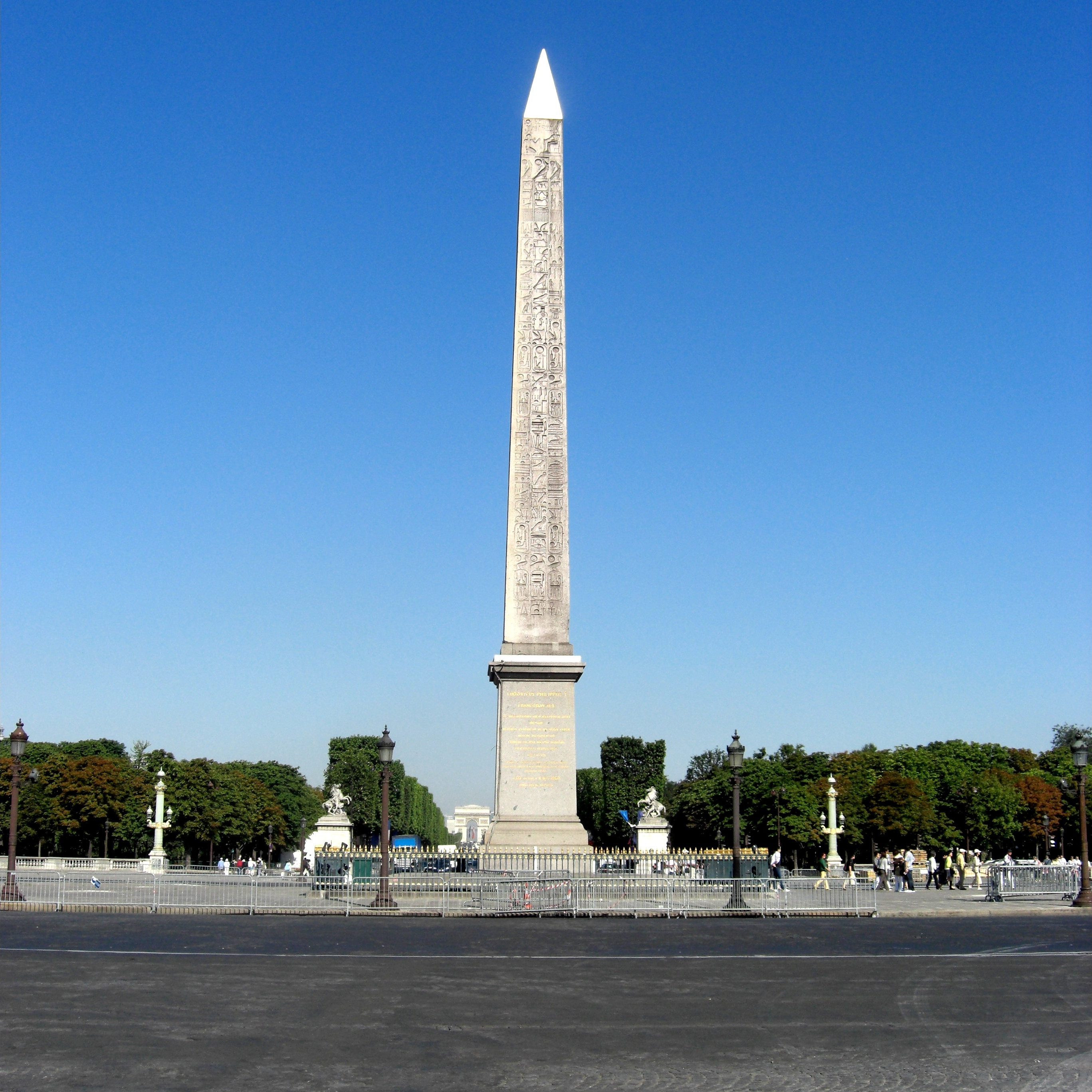
The Obelisk of Luxor at the centre of the Place de la Concorde, Paris

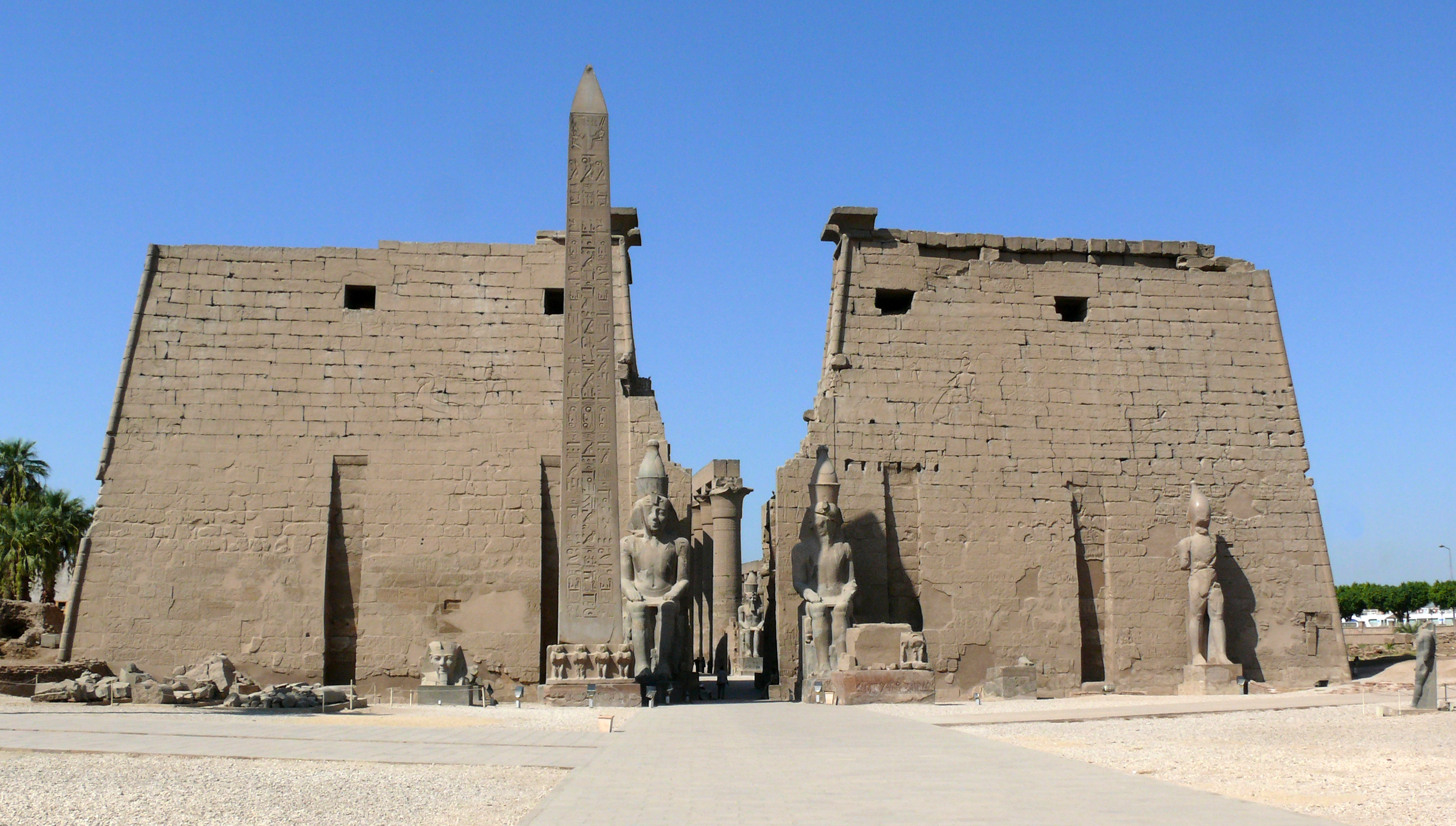
The remaining obelisk at Luxor Temple pylon

Both obelisks in their original position before the pylon of Luxor Temple, 1832

The Luxor Obelisks (French: Obélisques de Louxor) are a pair of ancient Egyptian obelisks, over 3,000 years old, carved to stand at either side of the portal of the Luxor Temple in the reign of Ramesses II (c. 1250 BC). The right-hand (western) stone, 23 metres (75 ft) high, was gifted by Egypt to France in the 1830s and moved to the Place de la Concorde in Paris, while the left-hand (eastern) obelisk remains in its location in Egypt. The Luxor Obelisk in Paris was classified officially as a monument historique in 1936.

== Together in Egypt ==
=== Creation ===
The Luxor Temple predated Ramesses II by about 150 years. During his reign, renovations were made that included the addition of the two obelisks.

The obelisks were each carved from a single piece of red granite, quarried about 100 miles (160 km) south of Luxor in Aswan, transported on a specially designed barge, and lowered into place with ropes and sand.

=== Physical features ===
The two obelisks were slightly different heights, and the one remaining in Luxor is taller. The shorter obelisk was mounted on a taller pedestal and placed farther from the pylon than the other. To an advancing spectator the obelisks may have appeared to be the same height, and this design choice may have been highly deliberate.

The obelisk remaining in Luxor leans. The Paris obelisk has a fissure in the original stone that had been tended to in antiquity.

The eastern and western faces of each obelisk were slightly convex, the only two ancient obelisks with the feature, and the reason for this is not understood.

=== Hieroglyphs ===
Both obelisks feature hieroglyphic text carved in sunken relief on all four sides. In the 19th century, François Chabas produced a full translation of the western (Paris) obelisk, which is about Ramesses II, Amun-Ra, and Horus, and can be read here.

== Luxor Obelisk in Paris ==
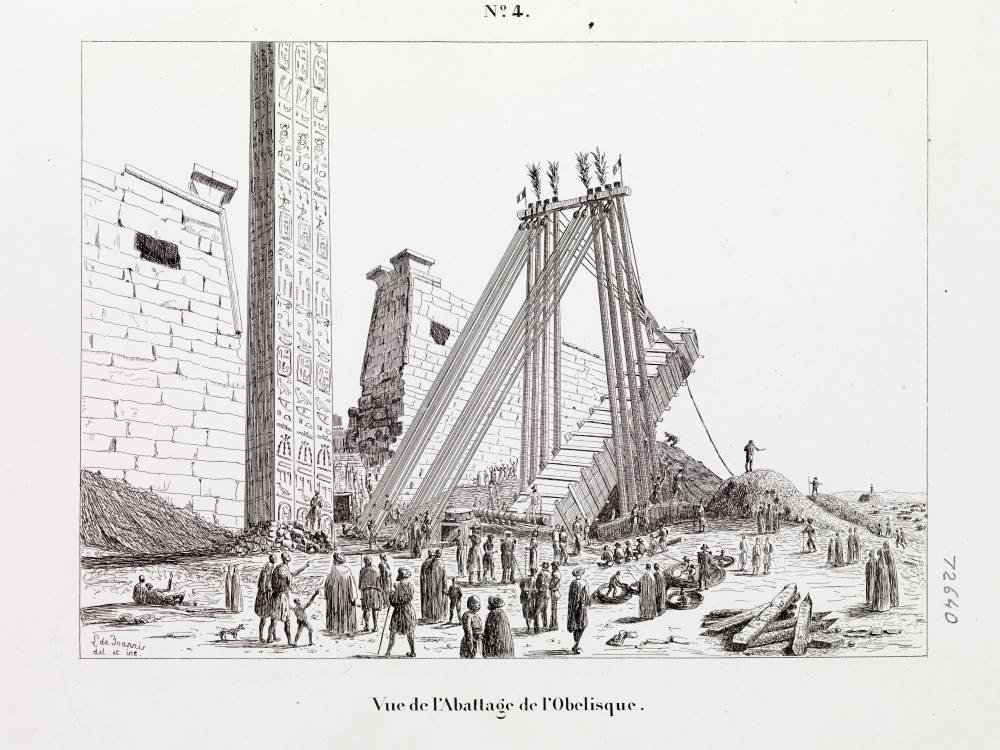
Removal of the obelisk

=== Idea ===
The idea to transport the Luxor Obelisks to Paris appeared first during Napoleon's campaign in Egypt. On 21 March 1799 General Louis-Charles-Antoine Desaix wrote a letter to Napoleon informing him of the existence of two obelisks in Thebes which would constitute an extraordinary sight once brought to Paris. Similarly, Vivant Denon recalls in his 1802 Voyage dans la basse et la Haute Égypte the possibility to bring the obelisks to Paris as a trophy of French conquest. Finally, on 8 October 1800, Jean-Marie-Joseph Coutelle presented before the Institut d'Égypte in Cairo the first technical considerations on the transport and erection of one of the obelisks to the Place de la Concorde. With the eventual end of the French Campaign in Egypt, these plans, however, were never realized.

Under Napoleon's successor, Louis XVIII, the French acquired rights to Cleopatra's Needle in Alexandria, though this obelisk was never moved to France and ended up in New York City in 1881.

In the 1820s Charles X opened an Egyptian Museum and sought an obelisk as a piece of Egyptian art. Around this time, Jean-François Champollion, who had recently achieved prominence for his decipherment of the Rosetta hieroglyphs, saw the Luxor obelisks for the first time and urged the French government to acquire them over any other obelisks.

=== Gift ===
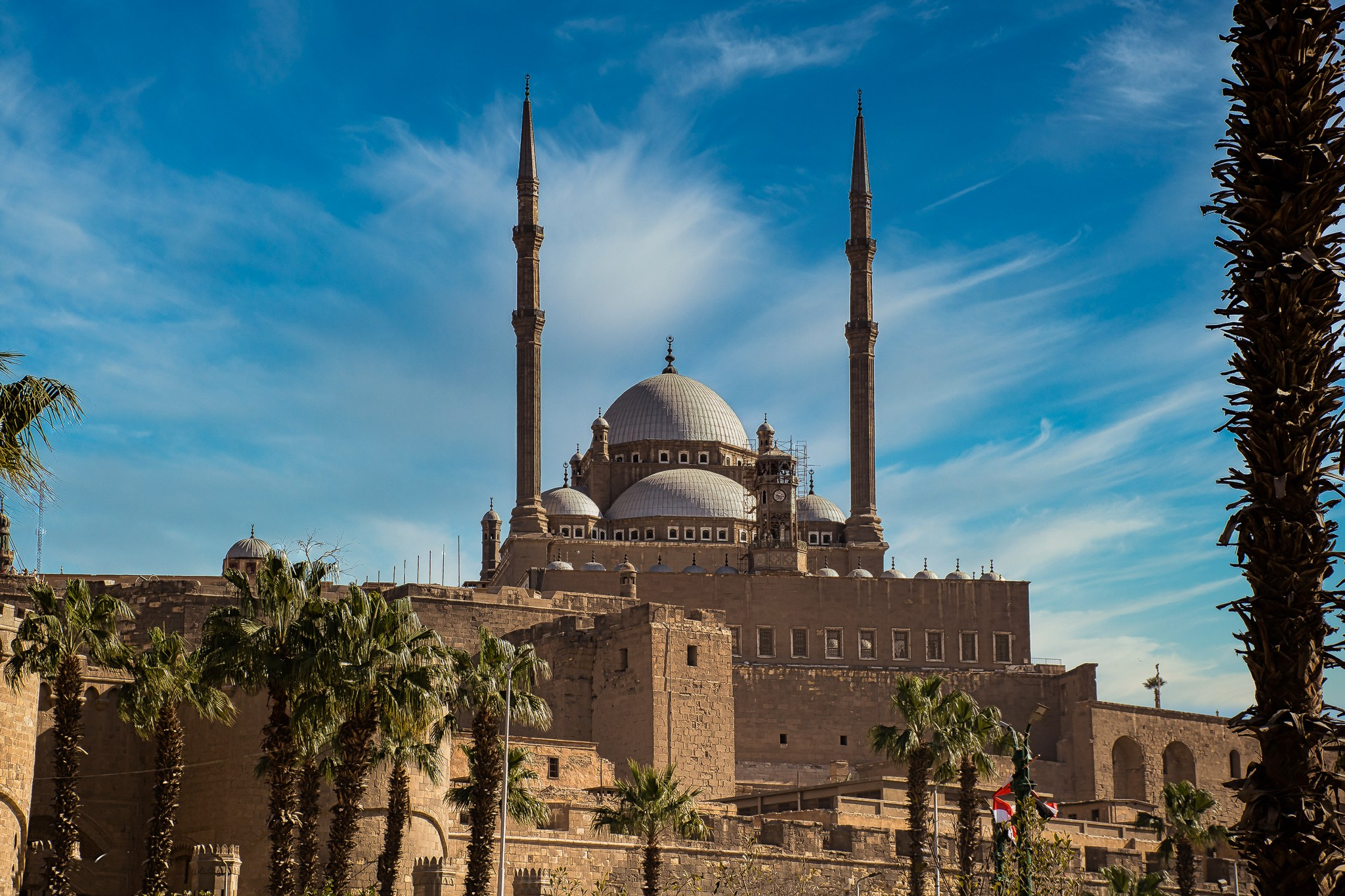
Cairo Citadel Clock, reportedly given by the French in the 1840s, outside the Mosque of Muhammad Ali

In November 1830, Muhammad Ali Pasha, ruler of Ottoman Egypt, officially gave the Luxor obelisks to France. In so doing he reversed a previous gift of the two obelisks to the British: on a suggestion by France's Consul-General Mimault, himself inspired by Champollion, he instead gave the UK the obelisk of Hatshepsut in Karnak Temple, which was in fact impractical to extract from the surrounding stone structures as Champollion knew well; the British nevertheless accepted. Also, French diplomat Baron Isidore Justin Séverin Taylor, Mimault's senior, finalized the terms of the gift despite having been mandated to do so by Charles X, who had been overthrown in the meantime by the July Revolution.

In reciprocation for the gift, France (disputedly) gave the Ottomans a mechanical clock in the 1840s, today known as the Cairo Citadel Clock. The clock has rarely worked since its arrival in Cairo, but in 2021 the Supreme Council of Antiquities announced that "Egypt is seeking to repair the citadel clock, one of the oldest of its type in the world, so that it will work again."

In 1981, President François Mitterrand of France definitively renounced possession of the second obelisk, thus restoring its property to Egypt.

=== Transport and re-erection ===
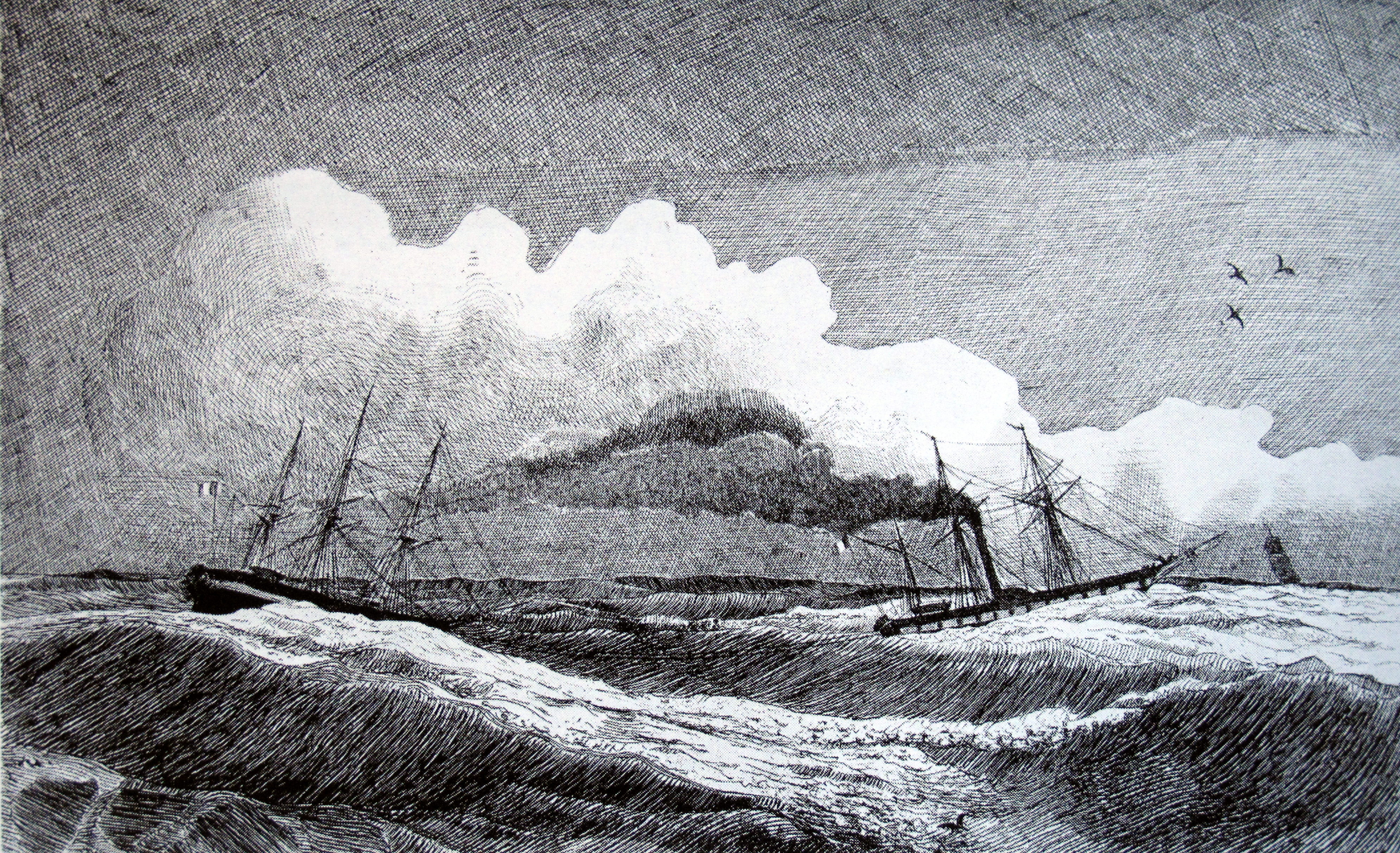
Sphinx towing the barge Louqsor ferrying the Luxor Obelisk to France

It was decided that the western (shorter) obelisk would be moved first, and in 1831, it was taken down. It was transported by a ship custom-built for the transport, the Luxor. It arrived in Paris in 1833 and was erected in 1836 at the centre of Place de la Concorde by King Louis-Phillipe. Champollion could not see the completion of his project, since he died in 1832 as the obelisk was still between Luxor and Alexandria.

The total cost of relocating the obelisk was estimated at 2.5 million francs (equivalent to an estimated €16 million or $19 million in 2020). The high cost may be why the second obelisk was never moved.

The choice of the Concorde was politically expedient, because that spot was iconic and emotionally charged — not least for having been the main location of the guillotine during the French Revolution — and it was difficult to find a way to fill it in a way that would convey sufficient prestige but not inflame political passions. The obelisk matched these criteria perfectly, given its antiquity and lack of connection with French history. It won over alternative options including the Cour Carrée of the Louvre, which had been recommended by such luminaries as Edme-François Jomard and Vivant Denon, but would have been technically more difficult.

=== Pedestal ===
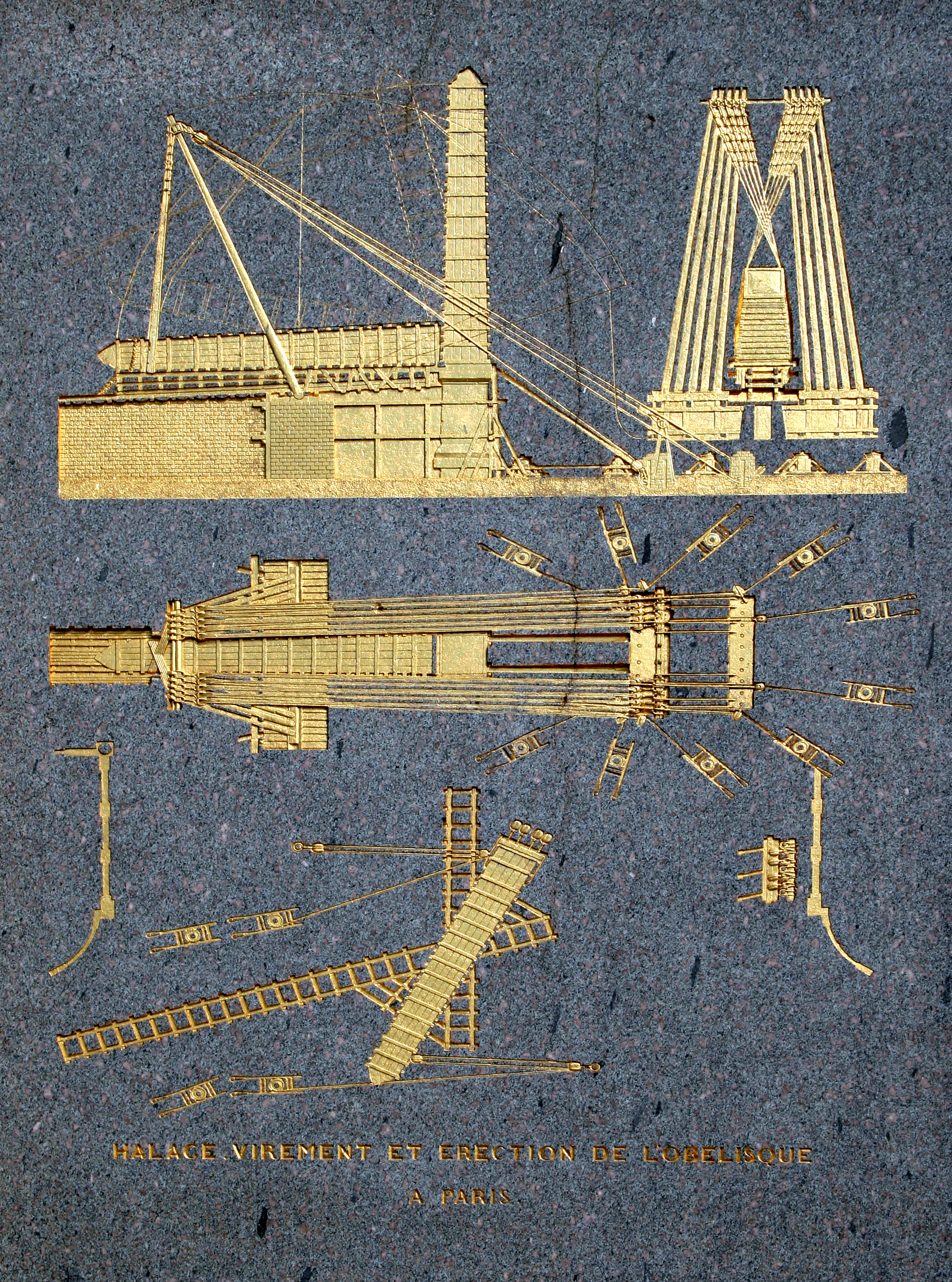
Detail of the modern pedestal in Paris

The present-day pedestal was originally intended for a statue by Jean-Pierre Cortot of Louis XVI, but the statue was destroyed during the July Revolution in 1830. In 1839, diagrams explaining the complex machinery that was used for the transportation were added to the pedestal.

The original Egyptian pedestals involved sculptures of baboons with prominent male genitalia, raising their hands to the sun. A fragment of this original pedestal from the rear of the remaining obelisk was brought to Paris at the same time as the obelisk, intended to be displayed with it. Deemed too obscene for public exhibition, it was sent to the Egyptian section of the Louvre.

=== Pyramidion ===
France added a gold-leafed pyramid cap to the top of the obelisk in 1998, with the costs covered by sponsorship from Yves Saint Laurent. It had long been suspected that the bare pyramidion had originally been covered with a bronze, gold, or electrum cap, speculated to have been stolen in the 500s BC.

With the pedestal and cap, the height of the monument is approximately 33.37m (109ft).

=== Poetry ===
Following her visit to Paris in 1840 Lydia Huntley Sigourney wrote her poem Obelisk of Luxor, in the Place de la Concorde., which she published in her Pleasant Memories of Pleasant Lands in 1842.

== Modern events ==
- On 1 December 1993, demonstrators from Act Up Paris, an organization dedicated to fighting AIDS, covered the Parisian obelisk with a giant pink condom to mark World AIDS Day.
- In 1998 Alain "Spiderman" Robert, the French urban climber, illegally scaled the Parisian obelisk without the use of any ropes or other climbing equipment or safety devices.
- In 1998, the monument was covered by a replica trophy as part of the 1998 World Cup
- In 1999 as part of Paris's millennium celebration activities, 300 brass disks and nearly 1,000 feet of yellow thermosensitive strips were placed around the obelisk in order to use it as the gnomon of a functioning sundial. They remained until the end of the year 2000.
- In 2015 Milène Guermont's monumental interactive sculpture PHARES was displayed next to the obelisk for several months, where it was designed to illuminate the obelisk.

== See also ==
- Cleopatra's Needles
- List of Egyptian obelisks
