= PHARES =

- Artist: Milène Guermont
- Year: 2015; 11 years ago
- Medium: golden aluminium and light
- Website: Official website

Phares (stylized PHARES) is a monumental interactive sculpture by Milène Guermont.

This monument made of golden aluminium and light can be considered as a “beacon of headlights” (“phare de phares” in French).

The first location of this 97-foot-high artwork was next to the Obelisk on Place de la Concorde in Paris (from October 2015 till April 2016) where the first public test of electric lighting in the world happened in 1843.

Passers-by can transmit their heart rhythms directly into PHARES via a built-in sensor, and then see it sparkle as it replicates the heart beats in real-time.

In February 2016, PHARES also interacted with the Eiffel Tower and the Montparnasse Tower that illuminate at the rhythm of the same heartbeat.

It is labelled “COP21 / CMP11“ (21st session of the Conference of the Parties to the United Nations Framework Convention on Climate Change), “PARIS FOR THE CLIMATE” and by the international jury of “2015 international year of light“ launched by UNESCO.
