= Ablaq Palace =

Former palace in Cairo, Egypt

Coordinates: 30.028611°N 31.259722°E

The Ablaq Palace (Arabic: قصر الأبلق, romanized: Qaṣr al-Ablaq, lit. 'Striped Palace') was an important palace complex located in the Citadel of Cairo, Egypt. It was built in the early 14th century by the Mamluk sultan al-Nasir Muhammad. The palace continued to be used afterwards but was eventually neglected and finally demolished by Muhammad Ali, the ruler of Egypt in the 19th century, in order to make way for a new mosque and other renovations.

== History ==
The Ablaq Palace was located inside the Citadel of Cairo, which was begun by the Ayyubid sultan Salah ad-Din (Saladin) and expanded under his successors Al-'Adil and Al-Kamil. The citadel's structures were almost continuously developed, restored, or rebuilt during the Mamluk period (1250–1517). The Bahri Mamluk sultans were especially active, transforming the Southern Enclosure of the Citadel, which contained the private palaces of the sultans, into the site of important monumental structures which also had ceremonial or administrative functions. Al-Zahir Baybars, al-Mansur Qalawun, al-Ashraf Khalil and al-Nasir Muhammad each built or rebuilt the audience hall (throne hall), the main mosque, the palaces, or other structures. Al-Nasir Muhammad's constructions were especially significant in the long-term and among them was the Great Iwan and the Ablaq Palace. The latter was built in 1313–1314.

In the early 19th century the new ruler of Egypt, Muhammad Ali, renovated the entire Citadel and built his own structures, while also seeking to erase symbols of the Mamluk legacy that he wanted to replace. Many of the former Mamluk structures, including the Great Iwan and the Ablaq Palace of al-Nasir Muhammad, were demolished in 1825 to make way for the Muhammad Ali Mosque and its renovated surroundings.

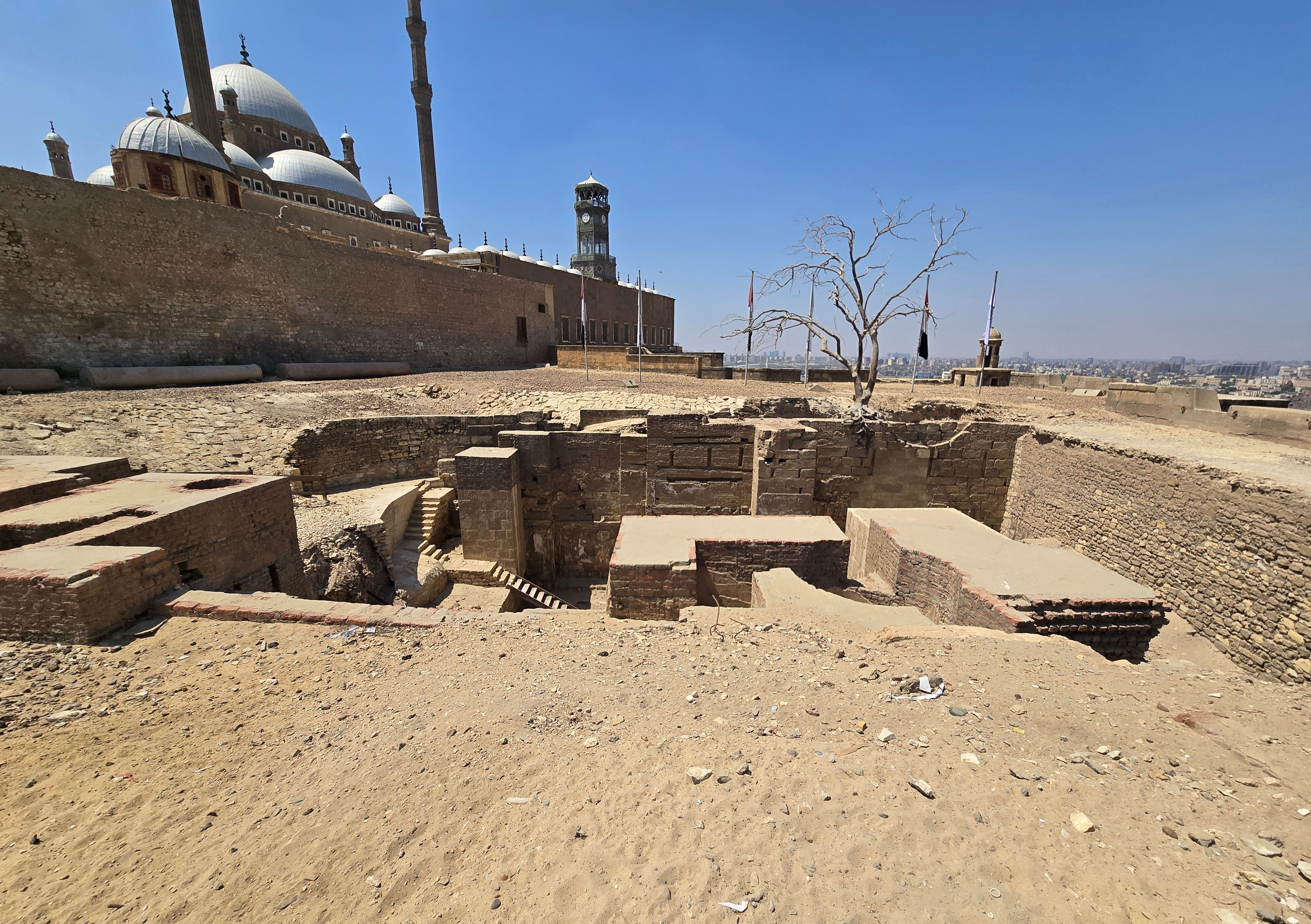
The remains of a Mamluk reception hall (qa'a) excavated at the Citadel of Cairo. The hall may belong to the Ablaq Palace built by al-Nasir Muhammad or to a slightly earlier palace, the Qa'a al-Ashrafiyya, built by his predecessor al-Ashraf Khalil.

In 1985, the Egyptian Antiquities Organisation discovered a reception hall (qa'a) belonging to the Bahri Mamluk period during excavations on the terrace next to the present-day Police Museum in the Citadel. These remains are visible to visitors today. The identity of the excavated hall has been interpreted in different ways based on its location, style, and the presence of an inscription that includes the name "al-Ashraf". The excavation team identified it as one of the reception halls of the Ablaq Palace built by al-Nasir Muhammad (early 14th century), which possibly reused some elements from an earlier palace of al-Ashraf Khalil nearby. Nasser Rabbat, a professor of Islamic architecture, instead identified the remains as belonging to the Qa'a al-Ashrafiyya, the nearby palace built by al-Ashraf Khalil earlier in the late 13th century. Fragments of mosaic decoration discovered at this site have since been placed on display at the National Museum of Egyptian Civilization, which labels them as belonging to the Ablaq Palace.

== Description ==
The palace's name derived from the red-and-black ablaq masonry that marked its exterior. It may have been partly inspired by the palace of the same name that Sultan Baybars had built in Damascus in 1264 and in which al-Nasir resided when he visited that city. The palace was used for regular receptions and private ceremonies. It was connected to the nearby Great Iwan by a private passage or corridor which led to the sultan's entrance in the back wall of that building. The walls of the palace itself formed a part of the new outer boundary of the Citadel's enclosure: it was located on an escarpment overlooking the city below, and the escarpment, along with the foundation walls of the palace, acted as the effective outer wall of the Citadel at its western corner. Because of this, al-Nasir was able to build a loggia on the side of the palace from which he could freely observe the activities in the stables and in the maydan (hippodrome) at the foot of the Citadel below, as well as a private door and staircase which gave him direct access between the palace and the hippodrome.

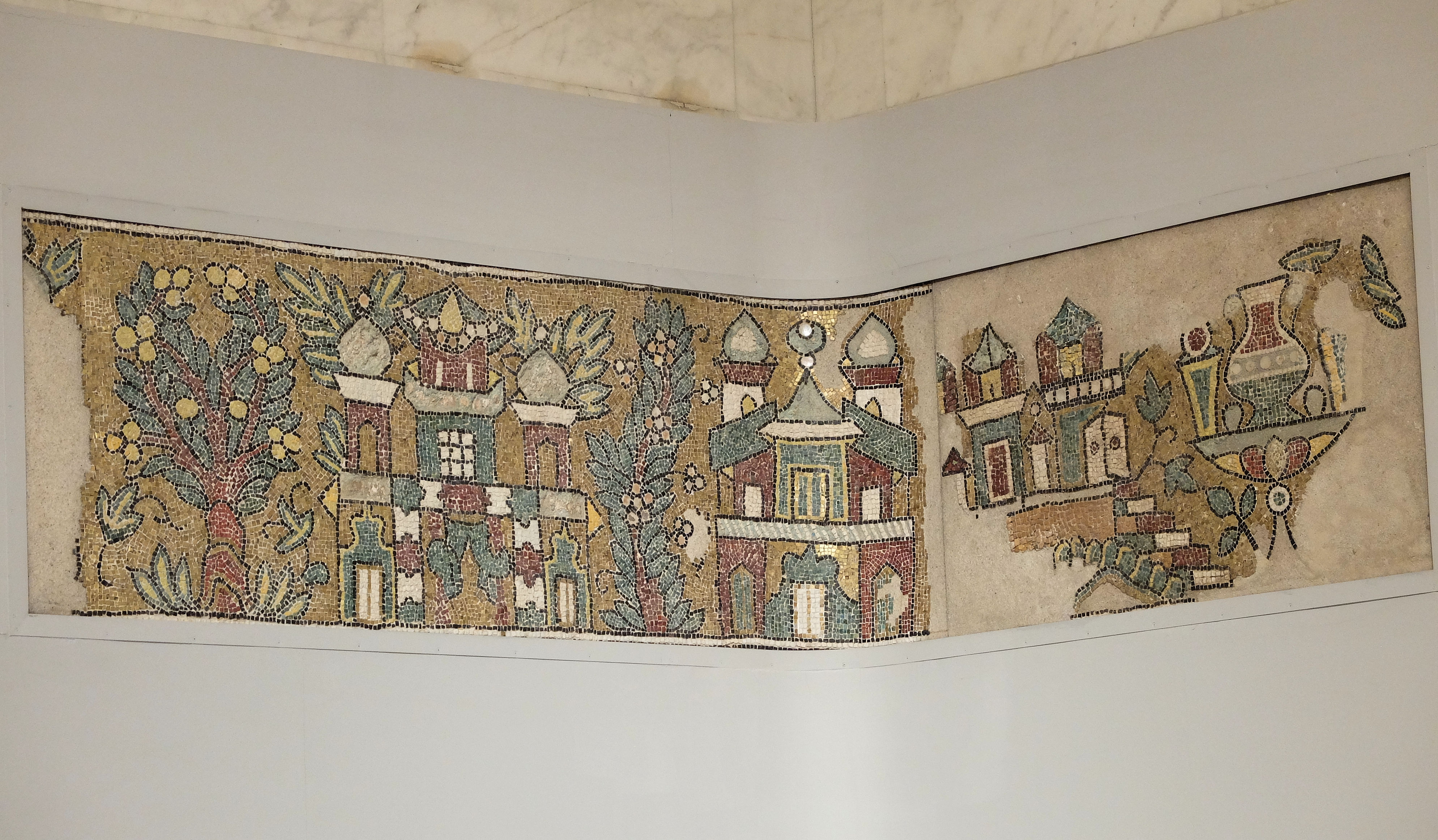
Fragments of glass mosaic decoration found in the excavated reception hall at the Citadel (possibly part of the Ablaq Palace), currently displayed at the National Museum of Egyptian Civilization.

The interior layout of the palace consisted of a large qa'a (reception hall) courtyard with two unequal iwans (vaulted chambers open on one side) facing each other and a central dome in the middle. The larger iwan, on the northwestern side, gave access to the outside loggia with views of the city, while the southeastern one gave access to the private passage to the Great Iwan. This also served as the throne room of the palace complex. From here one could access three "inner palaces" with the same layout but located on different levels, with the last two reached by stairs. These palace sections were lined up in a row and all faced in the same direction, apparently so that every qa'a had a similar view of the city from its northwestern iwan. From these inner palaces the Sultan could also access the buildings of his harem (where his wives and concubines lived) in the southeastern part of the Citadel. According to historical chronicles, the palace complex was richly decorated with marble floors, marble and gold paneling (dadoes), windows of coloured glass from Cyprus, Arabic inscriptions, colorful mosaics with mother-of-pearl that featured floral patterns, and gilded ceilings painted in lapis lazuli blue.

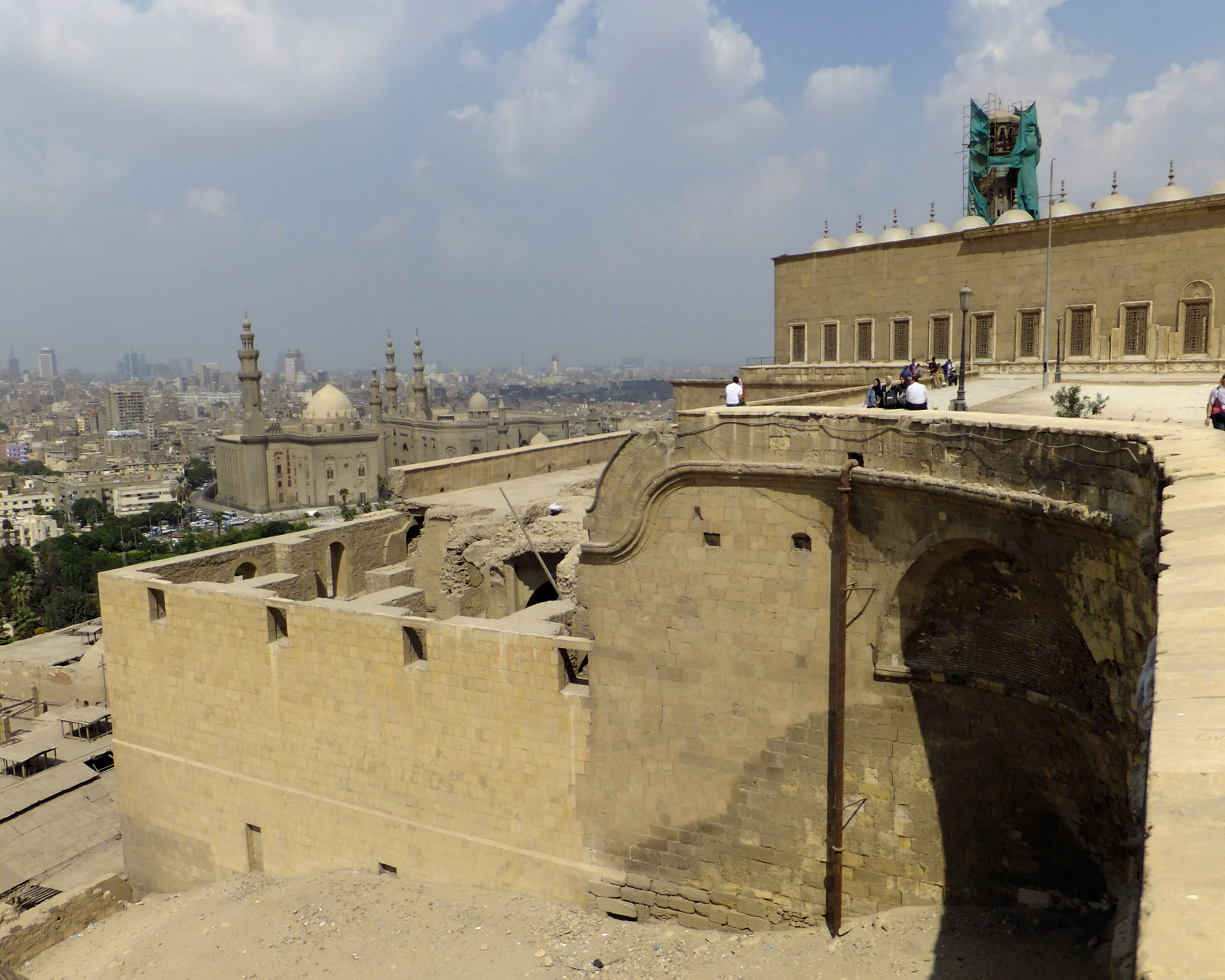
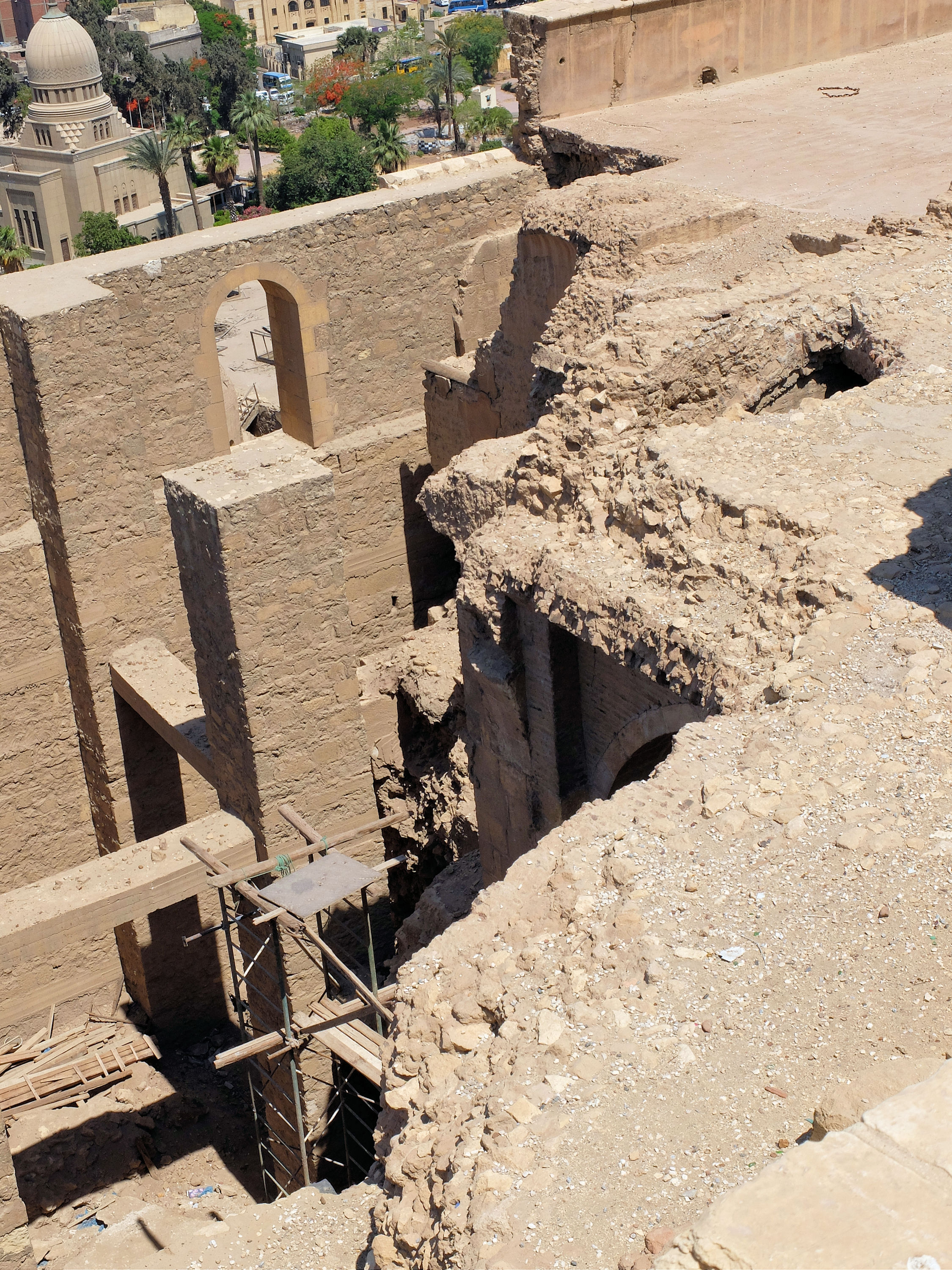
View from the terrace south of the Mosque of Muhammad Ali. The corner of the terrace exposes a ruined substructure that may be the former lower levels of the Ablaq Palace.

The location where the palace once stood has not been identified beyond doubt. Creswell suggested that a set of massive stone corbels at the foot of the walls northwest of the Mosque of Muhammad Ali would have once supported the upper levels of the palace. More recently, Nasser Rabbat argued that a much more likely site is the partly ruined terrace just below the mosque's southwestern corner (inaccessible but partly visible to visitors today), which shelters a vast space of vaulted halls. These halls would likely have been the lower levels of the palace, acting as a substructure supporting the main palace above. If this is correct, then a part of the Mosque of Muhammad Ali today would likely overlap with the former location of the palace.
