= Great Iwan =

Monumental throne hall in Cairo, Egypt

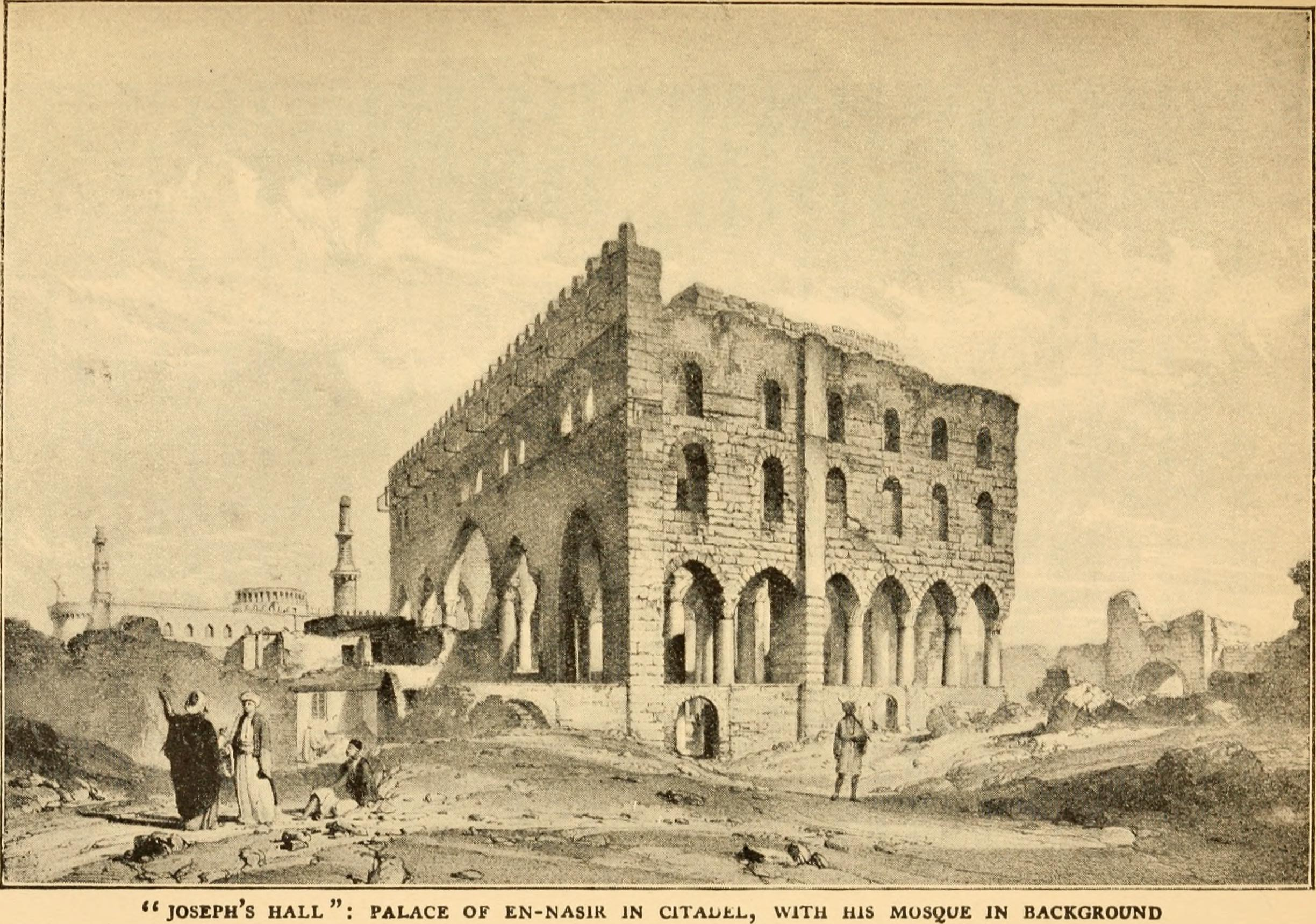
The ruins of the Great Iwan, as seen in the early 19th century (missing its dome), before it was demolished by Muhammad Ali.

The Great Iwan (Arabic: الإيوان الكبير, romanized: al-Iwan al-Kabir) was a monumental throne hall located within the Citadel of Cairo, Egypt. It was built by the Mamluk sultan Al-Nasir Muhammad in the early 14th century and was considered one of the most impressive structures in the city at the time. It fell slowly into ruins over several centuries before being demolished by Muhammad Ali in 1825 to make way for the present-day Mosque of Muhammad Ali and other constructions.

== Name ==
The Great Iwan was also known as the Iwan al-Nasiri ("Iwan of al-Nasir") or the Dar al-'Adl ("Hall of Justice"), the latter name deriving from its use as a venue for the dispensation of the sultan's justice. Although the Great Iwan was a large domed structure, which in Arabic is more typically called a qubba, both qubba and iwan were terms that were used to denote monumental throne halls during the Mamluk period. The term iwan is used elsewhere to denote a vaulted hall open on one side, a feature prominently used throughout Islamic architecture, especially in regions of Iranian influence. In Cairo, however, the term seems to have been increasingly used for secular architecture in the late 13th and 14th centuries, while the term qubba was reserved for funerary architecture. Al-Nasir Muhammad's structure was thus called an iwan even though its main element was a domed hall, not a vaulted hall.

In the later Ottoman period (after 1517), the Great Iwan's name became distorted and came to be known as the Diwan of Sultan al-Ghuri, as recorded by Evliya Çelebi. By the end of the 18th century it was being called the Diwan Yusuf, a name that was recorded by the French writers of the Description de l'Égypte at the beginning of the 19th century: "Divan de Joseph".

== History ==
The Great Iwan was located inside the Citadel of Cairo, which was begun by the Ayyubid sultan Salah ad-Din (Saladin) and expanded under his successors Al-'Adil and Al-Kamil. The citadel's structures were almost continuously developed, restored, or rebuilt during the Mamluk period (1250-1517). The Bahri Mamluk sultans were especially active, transforming the Southern Enclosure of the Citadel, which contained the private palaces of the sultans, into the site of important monumental structures which also had ceremonial or administrative functions. Al-Zahir Baybars, al-Mansur Qalawun, al-Ashraf Khalil and al-Nasir Muhammad each built or rebuilt the audience hall (throne hall), the main mosque, the palaces, or other structures. Unlike the earlier Ayyubid buildings, the Mamluk buildings were increasingly designed to be visible from afar and to dominate the city's skyline.

Sultan Baybars (ruled 1260–1277) first built the Qubba al-Zahiriyya ("the Dome of al-Zahir"), a monumental and richly decorated hall with a central dome which acted as an audience hall or throne hall. Located in the Southern Enclosure, it may have been a new structure or an addition to an existing Ayyubid structure, but it was most likely the predecessor of al-Nasir Muhammad's "Great Iwan". Sultan Qalawun (ruled 1279–1290) later demolished it and replaced it with his own domed structure, the Qubba al-Mansuriyya. His son, Sultan Khalil (ruled 1290–1293), also demolished this qubba in turn and replaced it with his own structure, the Iwan al-Ashrafiyya (the word "iwan" seems to have been used from then on for this particular type of building). This new throne hall differed from previous incarnations in one notable respect: it was painted with pictures of al-Ashraf's amirs (commanders), each with their rank inscribed above his head.

Finally, Sultan Al-Nasir Muhammad (who ruled, with interruptions, between 1293 and 1341) demolished, yet again, the Iwan al-Ashrafiyya (throne hall) of his brother Khalil in 1311 and replaced it with his own structure known as the Great Iwan (al-Iwan al-Kabir). This reconstruction may have been out of a desire to make it appear even more prominent and monumental, as well as to perhaps accommodate larger ceremonies. In any case, he later demolished his own creation (either entirely or in part) and rebuilt it yet again in 1333, and it is this incarnation of the Great Iwan which survived up until the 19th century. It was frequently cited by chroniclers as the most impressive structure in Cairo, more monumental than almost any of the Mamluk mosques. It served as the sultan's public and ceremonial throne room and continued to be used (albeit less consistently) by Mamluk sultans after him. Al-Nasir Muhammad, who ruled at the apogee of Mamluk Egypt, also built several other major structures in the surrounding area such as the Ablaq Palace and the Mosque of al-Nasir Muhammad (the only structure still standing today).

In the early 19th century the new ruler of Egypt, Muhammad Ali, renovated the entire Citadel and built his own structures, while also seeking to erase symbols of the Mamluk legacy that he wanted to replace. Many of the former Mamluk structures, including the Great Iwan and the Ablaq Palace of al-Nasir Muhammad, were demolished in 1825 to make way for his new mosque and its renovated surroundings.

== Description ==
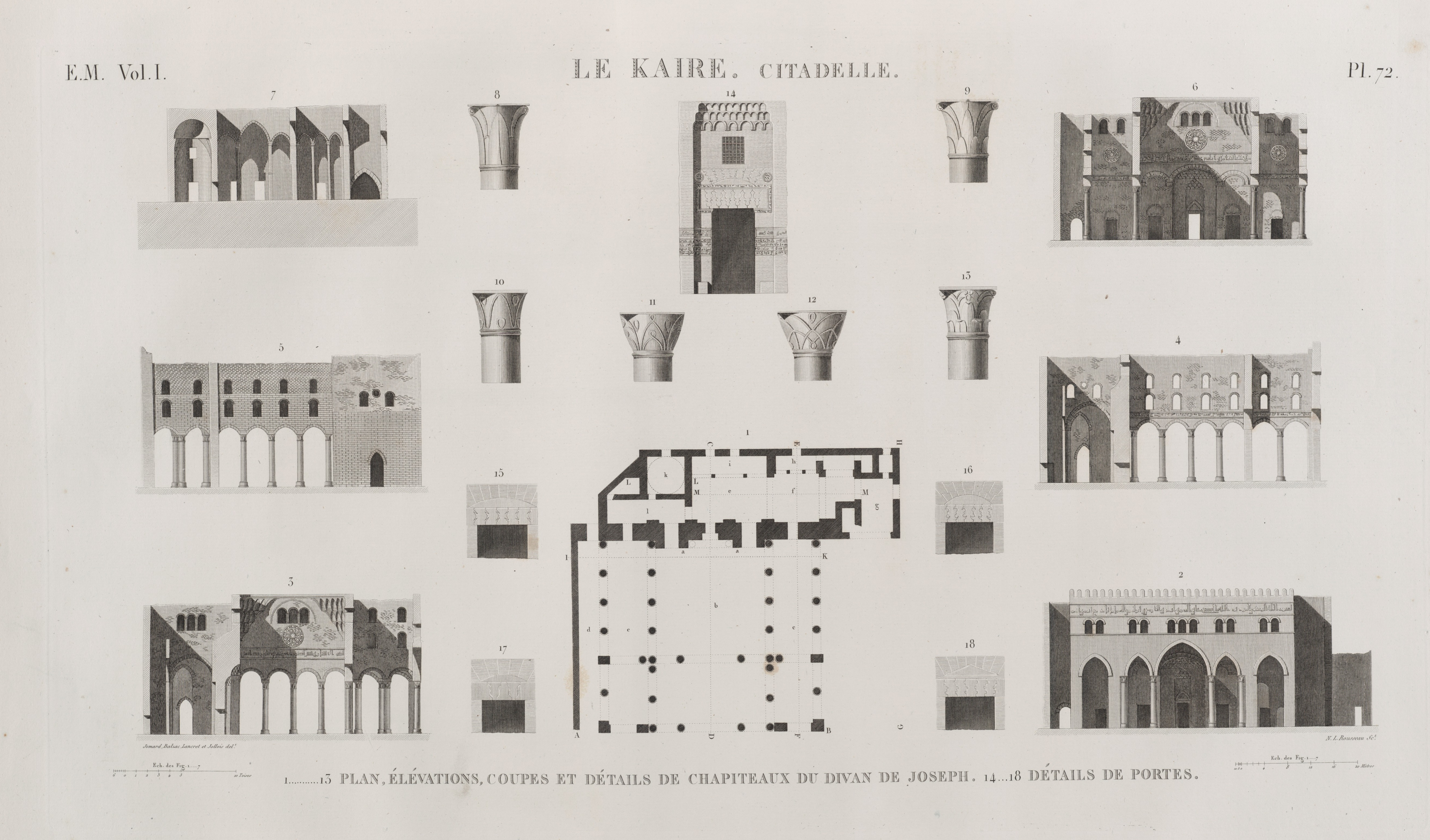
Floor plan and transversal views of the building's exterior and interior (missing its dome) documented in the Description de l'Égypte (early 19th century)

Some information about its appearance has been preserved by the drawings of its ruins made by the French expedition of Napoleon in the Description de l'Égypte. The Iwan was located north of the current Mosque of Muhammad Ali, possibly on the wide terrace now fronting the Police Museum and on the northern side of the Qa'a al-Ashrafiyya.

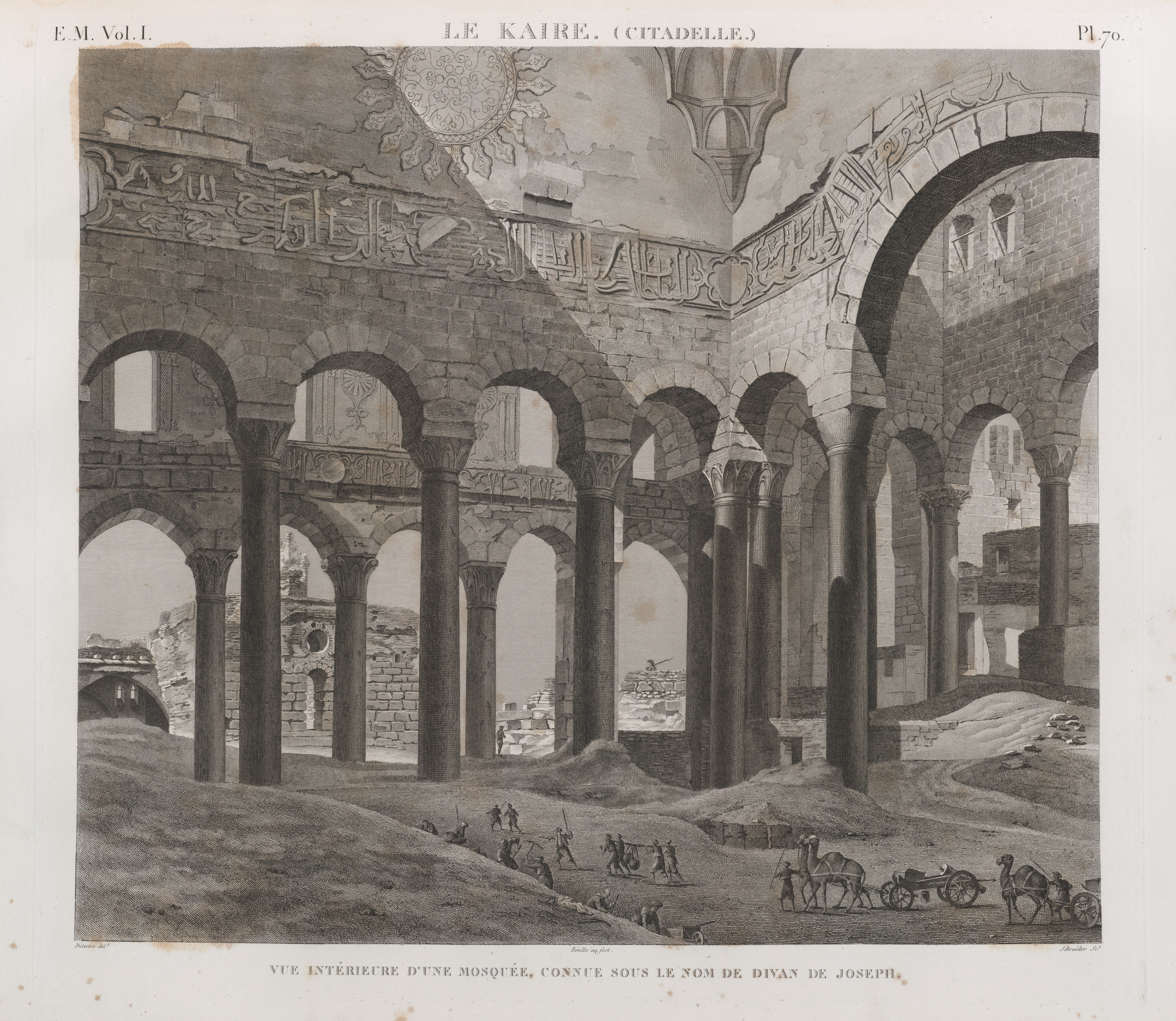
Ruined interior of the Great Iwan, as depicted in the Description de l'Égypte: Etat Moderne, 2^{eme} Tome; identified at the time as a mosque called "the Diwan of Joseph" (1809)

The building was rectangular and measured about 36 by 31 meters, and had the same alignment or orientation as the mosque he built nearby (see below). It consisted of a huge hall held up by rows of massive Pharaonic-era columns of red granite which were brought from Upper Egypt for the purpose. The hall was open to the exterior on three sides: to the northeast (its main facade), to the northwest, and to the southeast. The southwestern side of the building was taken up by a thick solid wall which faced towards the Ablaq Palace (see above). The other facades opened to the outside through large pointed arches between the rows of columns, with the central arch on the northeastern facade being larger than the others. This central arch in turn corresponded to the central aisle of the hall which was much wider than the other aisles and which led to a large square open space occupying the back and middle of the building. This space was covered by a large dome which was considered the most notable feature of the structure.

The dome was made of wood and covered in green tiles on the outside. The architectural transition from the round base of the dome to the square space below was achieved via large wooden pendentives carved in muqarnas (honeycomb or stalactite-like shapes). A large Arabic inscription in thuluth script ran along the surface of the walls between the arches below and the dome above. It probably announced Sultan al-Nasir Muhammad's titles and the foundation of the building. Above the inscription were other decorative "medallion" patterns, probably carved in stucco and resembling the style of the exterior stucco decoration on the dome of the Madrasa of Sunqur al-Sa'idi (from the same era). Another inscription also ran across the top of the main façade of the building on the outside. The large domed space was where the Sultan's throne was located. The back wall of the building, behind the throne, was pierced by five doorways. The central doorway, directly behind where the throne probably stood, was taller and apparently resembled a typical Mamluk monumental portal: it was recessed and crowned with a canopy or vault of muqarnas. This doorway led to a private passage that ran along the back wall of the Iwan and then connected to the Ablaq Palace, thus acting as the Sultan's entrance to the throne room.

== See also ==
- Late medieval domes
